= The Believers (film) =

1987 film by John Schlesinger

- Theatrical release poster
- Directed by: John Schlesinger
- Screenplay by: Mark Frost
- Based on: The Religion by Nicholas Conde
- Produced by: John Schlesinger; Beverly J. Camhe; Michael Childers
- Starring: Martin Sheen; Helen Shaver; Robert Loggia; Richard Masur; Harley Cross; Jimmy Smits
- Cinematography: Robby Müller
- Edited by: Peter Honess
- Music by: J. Peter Robinson
- Distributed by: Orion Pictures
- Release date: June 10, 1987 (United States)
- Running time: 114 minutes
- Country: United States
- Language: English
- Budget: $13 million
- Box office: $18.7 million

The Believers is a 1987 American horror noir film, directed by John Schlesinger and written by Mark Frost, based on the 1982 novel The Religion by Nicholas Conde. Starring Martin Sheen, Robert Loggia and Helen Shaver, the film follows a recently widowed police psychologist who is investigating a series of ritualistic child murders in New York City.

== Plot ==
After his wife Lisa dies from an accidental electrocution, psychologist Cal Jamison relocates with his young son, Chris, from Minneapolis to New York City, where Cal begins working as a police psychologist for the New York City Police Department. The city has been plagued by a series of brutal, ritualistic child murders. The first victim is a young boy found murdered in an abandoned movie theater. A policeman named Tom Lopez frantically phones in the discovery of the body, and claims the crimes are being committed by members of a Hispanic cult practicing a malevolent version of brujería. Cal is appointed to examine Tom, who raves about the cult's powerful leader.

A second victim is found eviscerated on a makeshift altar beneath a dock in Staten Island. Cal begins to inquire about brujería to Carmen, his housekeeper and nanny, who practices a benevolent form of it, leaving protection charms in the apartment for Cal and Chris. The following day, Tom, paranoid and being followed by mysterious men, stabs himself to death in a diner. Later, Cal and his new girlfriend, Jessica, attend a party where a mysterious Caribbean man, Palo, attempts to steal a necklace from Jessica; shortly before, Jessica had left her compact in the bathroom, and unbeknownst to Jessica, Palo rubs the pad with his fingers. When Cal returns home, he finds Carmen performing a ritual on Chris, and angrily throws her out of the house, despite the fact that she assures him she is attempting to protect him.

Chris accompanies his affluent Aunt Kate and Uncle Dennis on a trip to stay at their country home. Meanwhile, Cal and Jessica consult Oscar Sezine, a friend of Tom's, who believes the cult is planning a ritualized murder for the summer solstice in four days time. Oscar performs a purification ritual in an attempt to ensure the safety of Chris, whom he worries may be targeted as a sacrifice for the solstice. The next morning, Jessica finds a boil on her face and falls ill. Before departing to reunite with Kate, Dennis, and Chris in the country, Cal receives a frantic phone call from police lieutenant Sean McTaggert. Cal arrives at McTaggert's apartment, finding it in disarray, and McTaggert seated with a gun, rambling in a paranoid manner. He shows Cal a photo and secret file he uncovered documenting elite businessman Robert Calder's ritual murder of his own son. Cal leaves with the file at McTaggert's insistence. After he leaves, McTaggert commits suicide.

Meanwhile, Jessica has a panic attack after the boil on her face bursts and baby spiders break free from the wound. While Cal tends to Jessica in the hospital, Kate leaves him a voice message that she has changed her plans and is going to return Chris to him, but the message is cut short. Unaware Kate has called, Cal departs the hospital with his friend Marty, who drives him to Kate and Dennis's country house. Upon arriving, Dennis tells Cal that Kate has gone to a 24-hour grocery store. In the living room, Dennis recounts his and Kate's travels to the Sudan when Kate was a graduate student, and how they witnessed the power of a human sacrifice after allowing their gravely ill son to be sacrificed to end a drought. Palo and Calder then enter the room, along with a number of other cultists, urging Cal to join, and stating that Chris has been predestined to become a sacrifice.

Cal flees the house through an upstairs window after finding Chris no longer in his room. In the boathouse, Cal finds Kate's dead body before he is knocked unconscious by Palo. Cal is driven to an abandoned factory, where Chris's ritual murder is to be carried out among the cult. Cal thwarts the sacrifice by stabbing Dennis to death, and Marty, who followed them to the warehouse, comes to Cal's aid, shooting various cultists from an upper landing. Calder abducts Chris and the two ascend to the top of the warehouse in a freight elevator. Marty is incapacitated with a blowpipe dart by Palo, but not before he severely burns Palo's face, blinding him. Cal manages to chase Calder into a storage room, stabbing him to death before retrieving Chris. Cal puts Chris down and a blinded Palo attacks Cal, but falls off the scaffolding when Chris coaxes him toward him and is impaled on rebar below. Cal carries Chris and they escape from the warehouse.

Some time later, Cal, Jessica and Chris are living happily on a farm in the country, and Jessica is pregnant. Following their barking dog to the barn, Cal investigates the barn loft and finds an altar adorned with religious icons, fresh produce, loaves of bread, and various sacrificed animals. Hearing sounds from below he sees Jessica has come in. She confesses to making the shrine saying "I did it for us. We'll be safe now." Cal stares in shock as the screen fades to black.

== Cast ==
- Martin Sheen as Cal Jamison
- Helen Shaver as Jessica Halliday
- Harley Cross as Chris Jamison
- Robert Loggia as Lieutenant Sean McTaggert
- Jimmy Smits as Tom Lopez
- Malick Bowens as Palo
- Elizabeth Wilson as Kate Maslow
- Harris Yulin as Robert Calder
- Robert Clohessy as Diner Detective
- Lee Richardson as Dennis Maslow
- Richard Masur as Marty Wertheimer
- Carla Pinza as Carmen Ruiz
- Janet-Laine Green as Lisa Jamison
- Raúl Dávila as Oscar Sezine
- Geoffrey Kellett as Paramedic
- Eddie Jones as Police Patient

== Analysis ==
Barna William Donovan notes that while there were several Satanic-themed Hollywood films in the 1970s, for example The Exorcist (1973) and The Omen film series, by the 1980s Hollywood seemed to have lost interest in the subject. He cites The Believers as one of only two noteworthy films about Devil worship created in the 1980s, along with Angel Heart (1987), and noted its similarities to Indiana Jones and the Temple of Doom, which also featured a demon-worshiping cult that abducts children and offers human sacrifices.

Donovan wrote that where Angel Heart was a period piece set in the 1940s, and so fantastic that it limited its connections to the contemporary world of the 1980s "and its fundamentalist paranoias", The Believers was set in that contemporary world. Neither film approached the subject of 1980s hysteria over Satanic ritual abuse, a conspiracy theory which generated sensationalist headlines, the villains were instead practitioners of Santería, the legitimate Afro-Caribbean religion depicted in the film as "a cult of evil that condones human sacrifice". Donovan concludes that Hollywood distanced itself from the subject matter, probably because child sexual abuse was deemed an unfit subject for popcorn entertainment.

According to John Kenneth Muir, the message of the film is that yuppies would do anything for success, including calling upon dark gods, while simultaneously fearing ethnicity. For example, a cleaning woman working for the Jamisons tries to protect Chris by using a benevolent version of Santeria; Cal fails to distinguish between good and evil magic and treats her as a threat. The film depicts Manhattan as a place where alien cultures merge and the Christian white man has reasons to fear the pagans, who may come for his children. As such, it plays on a fear for the ethnic, racial, and religious Other. According to Mercedes Cros Sandoval, the film brought both public attention and negative publicity for Santería.

The film is more typical of its decade in the negative depiction of the upper class of New York City. The cultists turn out to be members of this social class which literally sacrifice their children in exchange for "fame, wealth, and power". Their success and upward mobility is based not on business acumen, but their practice of Santeria. Muir sees this as a literal interpretation of a familiar phrase, voodoo economics. Muir notes a few similarities with Rosemary's Baby (1968). An evil cult is depicted as active in a modern city, hiding in plain sight. And a couple of limousine liberal friends of the Jamisons are revealed to be cultists in their own right.

For Muir, the highlight of the film involves the depiction of a voodoo-like curse. Jessica Halliday (Helen Shaver) accidentally leaves her compact in a bathroom while snooping around in Calder's office. By the time she retrieves it, it has become a cursed item. While using it, something "gets under her beautiful skin". It manifests as a boil, which gets progressively redder and more inflamed. Finally it swells to capacity, and spiders start emerging from the boil's interior.

== Production ==
John Schlesinger was drawn to adapt the novel The Religion, co-written by Robert Stuart Nathan under the pseudonym Nicholas Conde, as he felt the novel was very cinematic. After acquiring the rights to the novel, Schlesinger and Mark Frost spent a year adapting the book, enlisting the help of the book's authors in researching Santería, referred to as "the religion" by its practitioners. Due to the closely guarded nature of the religion, Schlesinger and Frost relied on actress Carla Pinza, who plays Carmen Ruiz in the film, as a technical advisor due to her being a initiate priestess of Santería. Schlesinger wanted to avoid misrepresenting Santeria, and depicted it in the film as a force for good, with Brujeria, the practice of Black magic, as the antagonistic force in the story.

Filming took place primarily in Toronto, with some exterior locations in New York City, from June 5 until September 28, 1986.

== Release ==
=== Home media ===
The film was released on DVD on August 27, 2002 by MGM Home Entertainment. Twilight Time released a Blu-ray edition of the film on October 14, 2014; Olive Films later released another Blu-ray edition on June 25, 2019.

== Reception ==
=== Box office ===
The film opened on June 12, 1987 on 1,534 screens, grossing $4,342,732 and placing fifth for the weekend. It finished its theatrical run with a domestic gross of $18.7 million.

=== Critical response ===
On review aggregator Rotten Tomatoes, The Believers holds an approval rating of 35%, based on 20 reviews, and an average rating of 4.8/10.

Roger Ebert gave the film one and a half stars out of 4, denouncing the film as "an awesomely silly, tasteless, and half-witted movie." He wrote that most films about Caribbean religions tend to involve "guys with blank eyes" and animal sacrifice, bloodthirsty cults, sadistic killers, and a quest for innocent blood; they never depict any positive aspect to these religions, a prejudiced treatment. He also noted that while the film makes use of multiple ritualistic details, such as circles of ashes, blood, and charms, it never bothers to explain their meaning.

Dennis Schwartz' from Dennis Schwartz Movie Reviews awarded the film a grade C+, calling the film "muddled", and criticized the film's cheap scares, writing, and lack of a believable storyline.

However, not all reviews of the film were negative. Hal Hinson from The Washington Post gave the film a mostly positive review, writing, "The Believers is a bizarre, occult thriller about the implications of religious faith. And, though it doesn't expand upon its shock tactics as much as it would like to or make its theological points, the movie's dread atmosphere begins to seep into your head." Author and film critic Leonard Maltin awarded the film 2.5 out of 5 stars, calling it "Gripping", and "genuinely frightening". Brett Gallman from Oh, the Horror praised the film, writing, "While The Believers feels familiar on a surface level, its use of Santeria mythology and Schlesinger's deft blend of suspense and graphic shocks provide enough flavor to separate it from the flock."

=== Controversy ===
The Believers was shown to have influenced the cult established by Adolfo Constanzo and supported by Sara Aldrete in Matamoros, Mexico. The cult was based on Palo Mayombe, an Afro-Cuban religion similar to Santería.

== Bibliography ==
- Donovan, Barna William (2014). Conspiracy Films: A Tour of Dark Places in the American Conscious. Jefferson, North Carolina: McFarland. ISBN 978-0-7864-8615-1.
- Ebert, Roger (2000). I Hated, Hated, Hated This Movie. Andrews McMeel Publishing. ISBN 978-0-7407-9248-9.
- Maltin, Leonard; Carson, Darwyn (2012). Leonard Maltin's Movie Guide 2013. New York City, New York: Signet. ISBN 978-0-451-23774-3.
- Muir, John Kenneth (2007). Horror Films of the 1980s. Jefferson, North Carolina: McFarland. ISBN 978-0-7864-5501-0.
- Olupona, Jacob Kẹhinde; Rey, Terry (2008). Òrìşà Devotion as World Religion: The Globalization of Yorùbá Religious Culture. Madison, Wisconsin: University of Wisconsin Press. ISBN 978-0-299-22464-6.
- Cros Sandoval, Maria (2006). Worldview, the Orichas, and Santería: Africa to Cuba and Beyond. Gainesville: University Press of Florida. ISBN 978-0-813-03020-3.
