= Murder of Mark Kilroy =

1989 kidnapping and murder in Mexico

Mark Kilroy
- Born: Mark James Kilroy; March 5, 1968; Chicago, Illinois, U.S.
- Died: March 14, 1989 (aged 21); Rancho Santa Elena, Matamoros, Tamaulipas, Mexico
- Cause of death: Homicide (machete blow)
- Resting place: Mount Olivet Catholic Cemetery, Galveston County, Texas, U.S.
- Education: Santa Fe High School; University of Texas at Austin

Mark James Kilroy (March 05, 1968—March 14, 1989) was an American college student who was kidnapped, tortured and murdered by associates of cult leader Adolfo Constanzo as part of a human sacrifice.

Kilroy was kidnapped while vacationing in Matamoros, Tamaulipas, Mexico, during spring break. He was one of at least 14 victims similarly tortured and killed by Costanzo and his followers, who used the victims' remains in rituals for a version of the Palo religion, and who believed human sacrifice granted them immunity from law enforcement for their drug smuggling operations. The killing drew worldwide media attention and initiated an international police manhunt because of the unusual circumstances of the crime.

After the bodies were discovered on April 11, 1989, Constanzo fled to Mexico City but was eventually tracked down. As the police surrounded his apartment complex, Constanzo died after ordering one of the cult members to kill him with a machine gun. Sara Aldrete, another high-ranking member of the cult, was arrested at the scene along with several others. In 1993, several surviving cult members were found guilty of a number of charges, including capital murder and drug trafficking. Several of them, however, claimed they were not guilty of Kilroy's murder and told the press they were tortured to confess. Two suspects still remain at large.

== Background ==
=== Victim ===
Mark James Kilroy was born on March 5, 1968, in Chicago, Illinois, U.S. His parents were James William "Jim" Kilroy (1943–2024), a chemical engineer, and Helen Josephine Kilroy (1944–2014), a volunteer paramedic. They moved to Texas from the Midwest after their son was born. Kilroy grew up in Santa Fe, Texas, a small town outside of Houston, for over 15 years along with his brother Keith Richard Kilroy. He was raised as a Catholic and his parents were frequent attendees at Our Lady of Lourdes Catholic Church in the adjacent town of Hitchcock, Texas. Kilroy excelled both in academics and athletics as a teenager, and played baseball, basketball, and golf with his friends at school. He was in the Boy Scouts of America and an honors student at Santa Fe High School, where he was a member of the student council, and was ranked 14th in a class of 210 students. Upon graduation in 1986, he attended Southwest Texas State University in San Marcos, Texas, before transferring to Tarleton State University in Stephenville, Texas, on a basketball scholarship. At Tarleton he became a member of the Lambda Chi Alpha fraternity. He then decided to give up his athletics and transferred to the University of Texas at Austin to become a pre-med student and prepare for his Medical College Admission Test (MCAT).

=== Profile of cult leaders ===
Kilroy's murderer, Adolfo Constanzo, was a Cuban American who was born in Miami, Florida, in 1962. His father died when he was an infant, so his mother relocated to Puerto Rico with him, where she remarried. They returned to Florida in 1972 and his stepfather died soon afterwards, leaving a large inheritance behind. His mother married again, this time with a man who was involved in drug trafficking and the occult. His stepfather taught him a philosophy that Constanzo carried for the rest of his life: he told him that he should let nonbelievers "kill themselves with drugs" while he could profit from their foolishness. Around the same time, Constanzo's mother believed that her son had psychic abilities. She introduced him to Palo Mayombe, an Afro-Caribbean religion that involves animal sacrifice. He also was introduced to Santería when he was younger. (Note: Other sources state that Santería was erroneously associated with Constanzo and that it was strictly Palo Mayombe.) He started as a "palero", someone who practices Palo Mayombe, and eventually reached the status of high-priest, "padrino". In 1984, he moved to Mexico City to start his life as a tarot card reader and eventually developed a cult following. His charisma, physical attractiveness (he previously worked as a male model), and claimed psychic talent granted him the opportunity to mingle with Mexico City's upper class. His reputation for predicting the future and offering ritual cleansing became popular with some drug dealers, musicians, and police officers.

The other cult leader was Sara Aldrete, a Matamoros native and an honors student and cheerleader at Texas Southmost College. She was the girlfriend of Gilberto Sosa, a drug dealer linked to the Hernández clan to which Constanzo wanted an introduction. In 1987, she met Constanzo and eventually became the cult's main recruiter. (Note: Another source stated that Aldrete met Constanzo in 1988.) Investigators believed that Aldrete's physical attractiveness and charm helped her lure men to join the cult or to set them up to be abducted and killed. She recruited people by first showing them the 1987 thriller film The Believers, which was about a New York City-based cult that practiced human sacrifice for money and influence. Constanzo's members were forced to see the film again and again in order to indoctrinate them to the necessity of human sacrifice. Students and teachers at her college in Brownsville recalled her as a friendly and studious physical education student who showed no signs of abnormal behavior or involvement with a religious cult. Across the border in Matamoros, however, Aldrete was involved in drug smuggling operations and in cult activities. Some of her former classmates found it suspicious that she drove a 1989 vehicle with an embedded telephone, while others recall she preferred to dress in black. Investigators believed that her proximity to the U.S.-Mexico border allowed Aldrete to keep her two lives separate for years. Because of her contradictory lifestyle, law enforcement believed that Aldrete was living a double life and showed signs and symptoms of having a multiple personality disorder.

The ranch where Kilroy was murdered in Matamoros, Santa Elena, was owned by Brigido Hernández. He was not a follower of Constanzo and was not charged with any crimes in the U.S. or Mexico. The sudden death of Saul Hernandez in a shooting prompted his family, including Elio and his brothers Serafín Sr. and Ovidio, to grow closer to rituals and eventually become members of Constanzo's cult. Elio reportedly offered Constanzo half of his family's drug proceeds in exchange for his criminal contacts and supernatural protection for his family.

== Spring break trip ==
=== Prior to disappearance ===
On March 10, 1989, Kilroy's childhood friend Bradley Moore finished exams early at Texas A&M University and headed to Austin to pick him up. Both of them then headed to Santa Fe to pick up two other friends, Bill Huddleston and Brent Martin, before heading to South Padre Island, Texas, for spring break. After a foggy, 9-hour drive to South Texas, they arrived at South Padre Island shortly before midnight. (Note: Another source stated that they arrived to South Padre Island, Texas on March 11.) They checked in at the Sheraton Hotels and Resorts the next morning before heading to the beach.

There were few tourists when Kilroy and Moore initially arrived at South Padre Island at the beginning of the five-week spring break season; as the weekend progressed, thousands of students from the entire U.S. began to arrive. Beer sponsors were staging a variety of entertainment events, including free movies, music concerts, calls home, surf-simulator activities, and opportunities to appear on TV commercials. Kilroy and Moore made free phone calls to their parents that day. Later that evening, they met a group of female students from Purdue University and partied until the next morning.

The following morning, Kilroy and his friends had more or less a daily routine in mind. They went to the beach in the morning and suntanned before lunch. After lunch they went to the beach area behind their hotel for the daily Miss Tanline contest. Once the event was over that afternoon, Kilroy headed to the hotel for a quick nap before planning their trip to Mexico. They left South Padre Island that evening and stopped for dinner at a Sonic Drive-In in Port Isabel, Texas, where they met a group of female students from University of Kansas who were planning to party in Mexico as well. The women then followed Moore's car from Port Isabel to Brownsville and parked their cars close to the Gateway International Bridge before crossing the U.S.-Mexico border on foot. Kilroy's friends and the Kansas women spent most of their evening at Sergeant Pepper's night club in Matamoros before the groups went their separate ways. Kilroy and his friends then returned to South Padre Island early the next morning. On March 13, Kilroy and his friends attended another Miss Tanline contest behind the Sheraton. Early in the evening, Kilroy met with one of his former frat brothers at a condo party. At around 10:30 p.m. CT, Kilroy and his friends headed back to Matamoros. They parked on the border and crossed on foot again.

That night, Matamoros was flooded with 15,000 spring tourists from the U.S. on the city's main tourist street, Álvaro Obregón. The sidewalks, street, and night clubs were packed with foreign tourists looking to enjoy cheap alcohol and enjoy Mexico's lax drinking laws. (Note: According to Mexican law, the legal age for drinking is 18. However, it is rare for alcohol sellers to ask for an ID or deny a purchase. Drinking in public is also illegal but rarely enforced, especially for tourists on spring break in Matamoros.) When they got to Matamoros, Kilroy and his friends decided to go to the bar with the shortest waiting line. They ended up at Los Sombreros, a bar with rock music and bright neon. After a few drinks, Kilroy and his friends left Los Sombreros and wandered to London Pub, which rebranded itself as Hardrock Café for spring break. This bar was louder and wilder than Los Sombreros, and Kilroy and his friends stood at the bar while other tourists threw beer from the balcony. Kilroy met with a few women at the bar and was not seen by his friends for a while. Around 2:00 a.m. CT, Huddleston suggested the group head back to South Padre Island. As his friends stepped out of London Pub, they saw Kilroy leaning against a car and talking to a woman from Miss Tanline. Across Álvaro Obregón street, thousands of tourists were leaving the bars and heading to Brownsville, but others moved in different directions. The large crowd of people made it difficult for Kilroy and his friends to walk across the border uninterrupted and in a group.

=== Disappearance ===
Moore and Martin separated from the group and walked to García's, a popular restaurant-store close to the border. Kilroy stopped at the steps of a house on Álvaro Obregón to say good-bye to the woman from Miss Tanline. He then waited for Huddleston to walk towards him. Huddleston then ran to a nearby alley to urinate while Kilroy waited for him. (Note: Other sources mentioned Huddleston urinated behind a tree at a small park or in a nearby restroom.) By the time Huddleston came out and caught up with the other two near García's, Kilroy had vanished. His friends searched for him for hours, even after the establishments had closed and the streets had cleared at around 4:30 a.m. CT. They then crossed the border thinking Kilroy may have crossed to Brownsville and was perhaps waiting near their parked car. His friends did not find him near their car and waited a few minutes in Brownsville before returning to South Padre Island. They thought that Kilroy probably left for the hotel with someone else. They woke up the next day at the hotel and Kilroy's whereabouts were still unknown. His friends then contacted the police to report him missing. (Note: Another source states that the friends contacted Kilroy's parents first, who then contacted the police.)

== Investigation ==
The search for Kilroy initially began as a routine missing persons investigation. Students that were reported missing in Matamoros in the past would often turn up in the following days with a hangover and blurry memory of what had happened to them. Kilroy was one of the 60 people who had disappeared in Matamoros in the first three months of 1989. However, his case drew more attention in the U.S. because his uncle, Ken Kilroy, worked at the United States Customs Service in Los Angeles. When the news reached his uncle, a police task force was created in Brownsville to search for Kilroy. Alarmed with the bad publicity of his disappearance and the potential effects of tourism in Matamoros, local police officers tried to shift the blame and suggested that Kilroy had disappeared in Brownsville. Kilroy's friends denied such claims. The Mexican federal police force vowed to work on the case and help U.S. investigators. One of the commanders assigned Mexican agents to U.S. officials to accompany them in Matamoros. Together they questioned informants, potential witnesses, and worked on tips provided by their sources.

Both Mexican and U.S. authorities suspected that Kilroy's disappearance involved foul play. They speculated that Kilroy could have been a victim of drug-related violence or of robbery-killing, but they were short on leads to make any firm conclusions. When Kilroy's friends reported the disappearance, customs agents went with them to Matamoros to help retrace their steps. Texan officials contacted the U.S. consulate in Matamoros and asked investigators to carry out a search with Kilroy's description in Matamoros jails and hospitals. Investigators then hired a hypnotist to see if he could figure out some additional clues. Under hypnosis, Moore stated that he saw a young Hispanic man wearing a blue plaid shirt and with a visible scar across his face talking to Kilroy before he disappeared. He recalled that the man walked up to Kilroy and told him, "Hey, don't I know you from somewhere?" though Huddleston said he was not sure if Kilroy responded. However, none of the friends were able to precisely recall the exact moment or place where Kilroy disappeared. Investigators deduced by this story that Kilroy was kidnapped for robbery or ransom. The first option seemed the most likely because his abductors had not called for a payment. They believed that Kilroy's body was probably dumped in a remote location. Helicopters and terrain vehicles of the United States Border Patrol were called to look on the Rio Grande River, but his body was not found.

During the investigation, Kilroy's parents headed to the Rio Grande Valley and circulated more than 20,000 handouts throughout the region, and offered a $15,000 reward to anyone who could help locate their son. They met with Attorney General Jim Mattox, Texas Governor William Clements, and U.S. Senator Lloyd Bentsen to assist them on the case. Texan officials told Kilroy's parents that they were planning to talk to Tamaulipas Governor Américo Villarreal Guerra and get people from Matamoros more involved in their son's disappearance. People from Kilroy's hometown travelled to Matamoros and issued fliers offering a reward to anyone who could provide information on his safe return. U.S. authorities had praised the efforts of the Mexican federal police on the case, but they distrusted the state and municipal officials. They suspected that because state and local authorities were acting slowly and not sharing enough information, Kilroy's murderers had insiders within their ranks.

On March 26, the case was highlighted on national television in the crime show America's Most Wanted. This gave the case nationwide attention and generated several phone calls and letters with people giving clues on Kilroy's whereabouts. However, the police stated that none of the leads generated were solid enough to pursue. A few days later, Kilroy's parents returned to Santa Fe. Santa Fe residents raised money through garage sales and car washes to help Kilroy's family continue their search. In addition, Kilroy's parents went to the University of Texas at Austin to withdraw their son from school.

=== Investigation tightens ===
The key break in the case came on April 1, 1989. Mexican federales manning a drug interdiction checkpoint saw a vehicle run the roadblock without stopping. (Note: Investigators later revealed that the checkpoint was set up because U.S. Customs agents alerted the Mexican federal police that drugs had been introduced to Brownsville from this part of Matamoros.) The vehicle had crossed the international border from Texas and sped through Mexican Federal Highway 2, which connects Matamoros and Reynosa, Tamaulipas.

Instead of turning on their police sirens and stopping the truck, the police decided to follow it using an unmarked vehicle. The checkpoint-runner then traveled out to the Santa Elena ranch outside Matamoros. The police pulled off at a distance to observe. After about 30 minutes, the driver of the truck took off from the ranch and headed back to the city. The officers decided to make their move on the ranch. In a quick search, the police discovered cult paraphernalia and marijuana traces.

Police determined that the driver of the truck was Serafín Hernández García, the nephew of a local drug lord whose operations were based around the ranch area. But instead of arresting Hernández García, the police decided to continue gathering more evidence on the suspected criminal activities at the ranch and the organized crime members involved with the Hernández family. They used informants in Matamoros to inquire on "family" activities at Santa Elena, in order to make a series of crucial arrests.

On April 9, they returned with several other policemen and arrested Hernández García, his uncle Elio Hernández Rivera, cult members David Serna Valdez and Sergio Martínez Salinas, and Domingo Reyes Bustamante, the ranch's caretaker. (Note: The reason why the police took several days to return to the ranch was because they needed a search warrant.) While in custody, the detainees were very relaxed. They were sent to jail while the police interrogated another caretaker at the ranch. This person revealed to the police that the ranch had frequent visitors from Serafín's criminal group. The ranch's caretaker identified Kilroy through a photograph and stated that he saw him at the ranch. "Yeah", the caretaker told the police. "I saw him", and then pointed at the shack at the ranch.

When the police interrogated Hernández García separately, he confessed that several people, including Kilroy, had been killed over the course of several months at Santa Elena.

Hernández García said that the slayings had been ordered by Adolfo Constanzo, a cult leader who practiced a ritual form of human sacrifice in the belief that it provided supernatural protection for the drug gang. Constanzo believed that by sacrificing his victims, those doing the sacrifice were ensured strength, abundance, and immunity from law enforcement and injury.

Hernández García said that Constanzo had ordered his men to find a white, Anglo male to sacrifice. (Note: Sources disagree on the reasons why Constanzo ordered his sacrifice. One source states that Constanzo told his cult members that killing a white person and boiling his brain would give him the powers to cast spells. Other sources stated that Kilroy was killed because the group believed that by removing his brain, they would gain his intelligence. Other sources stated he was killed because the group was looking for someone who resembled Constanzo, their cult leader. Another source stated he was killed because Constanzo believed that he needed a "special" sacrifice to ensure success for a major drug smuggling operation he was conducting. Another source stated that Constanzo killed Kilroy because he believed that his death protected him from the U.S. police.)

According to Serafín Hernández García, he and other members of the gang had mingled with the spring-break students in Matamoros on the night of March 14. As Kilroy stood on the street near his friends, one of the men lured him close to a truck. (Note: A minority version of the story suggests that Kilroy was lured by the cult members because they offered him drugs and sex. This version contradicts the image of Kilroy in the U.S. media as "an innocent: a clean-cut, sturdy American college student".) As Kilroy approached the vehicle, Hernández García and another cult member, Malio Fabio Ponce Torres, (Note: His name is also spelled as Mario Fabio Ponce Torres by other sources.) grabbed Kilroy and wrestled him inside the truck. When one of the gangsters stopped for a few moments to catch his breath two blocks along the road, Kilroy broke loose and ran, but was intercepted by another vehicle driven by the gangsters' allies, who took him prisoner at gunpoint. He was then subdued and handcuffed in the back of the second car.

The gangsters drove Kilroy through the back streets of the city and past an industrial area, passing through the city's outskirts to Santa Elena ranch. The men left Kilroy inside the car overnight. Shortly after dawn, the ranch's caretaker went to see Kilroy and fed him bread, eggs, and water. About twelve hours after Kilroy was kidnapped, Constanzo and his men came to see him. They wrapped his face and mouth with duct tape and walked him through a field to a storage cabin with his hands still tied around his back.

Throughout the night of the 15th, Constanzo tortured and sodomized Kilroy. He was then led out to the field, where Constanzo killed him by chopping the back of his neck and head with a machete. His brain was then boiled in a nganga, an African metal pot that Constanzo used to stew human and animal remains. Kilroy's legs were chopped off above his knees to facilitate his burial. A wire was inserted in his spinal column so that, once the body had decomposed, the bones could be pulled up from the soil easily. The cult members then dug a hole on the grounds and buried Kilroy's corpse.

Hernandez Garcia agreed to take the police to the spot where Kilroy was buried, which was marked by the ends of the wire coming out of the dirt. Hernández García explained the function of the wire; once they retrieved the bones, cult members would wear them as necklaces to ward off danger and injury.

=== Remains discovered ===
On April 11, the police took Hernández García and the four other suspects to Santa Elena ranch, and forced them at gunpoint to spend several hours digging up the graves. Once Kilroy's corpse had been exhumed, the police observed that his legs were missing; Serafín explained that the amputations were not a procedure of the ritual, but were done to simplify burial.

When the excavation was concluded, the suspects had unearthed 15 mutilated bodies including Kilroy's, all males who had been killed over a period of nine months. (Note: Three of the 15 bodies were found in Los Leones, another ranch next to Santa Elena and owned by the Hernández clan. Another source stated that two additional bodies were found in Santa Librada, a ranch close to the murder scene, but did not confirm if they were part of the killings at Santa Elena.) Kilroy's corpse was officially identified after the Brownsville police matched his dental records with the teeth found at the scene. Investigators concluded that most of the victims were rival drug dealers of Constanzo and not random abductees like Kilroy. (Note: Family members of two victims stated that they their deceased relatives were not involved in any drug trafficking activities.) Three out of the 15 bodies were never identified. At Santa Elena, the Mexican police also seized 110 kg (243 lb) of marijuana, 108 grams of cocaine, 12 firearms including three submachine guns, and 11 vehicles, some equipped with telephones. Inside an iron pot, investigators discovered remains of human brain, a goat's head, chicken feet, a turtle, several herbs, a horseshoe, and coins mixed with animal blood. They found no signs of cannibalism. (Note: Some media outlets mentioned that Constanzo's cult practiced cannibalism. This information was false.)

On April 12, the detainees were taken to the headquarters of the Mexican Federal Judicial Police in Matamoros for an informal press conference. More than 250 international journalists arrived at the scene to take pictures and ask them questions. The four suspects were paraded from the building's balcony and were allowed to answer questions from reporters. Elio Hernández Rivera stated that he was an ordained executioner under Constanzo and that Constanzo himself had murdered Kilroy. As the cameras zoomed in on the suspects, Hernández Rivera showed his membership scars on his shoulders, back, arms, and chest. These were arrow-like cuts made with a hot blade. The marks were given to selected cult members with the authority to perform human sacrifice.

==== Reactions ====
On April 13, a religious ceremony initially intended to revive hope for Kilroy's safe return turned into a memorial service a day after his body was discovered. The service was held at Our Lady of Lourdes Catholic Church in Santa Fe. Many local residents attended the service and about 150 children pinned yellow ribbons outside the church's trees to rally in favor of Kilroy. After the ceremony, Kilroy's friends stated that they wished they had stayed in Texas to party instead of going to Mexico. At St. Luke Catholic Church in Brownsville, over 1,200 people attended a memorial service to support Kilroy's parents. Several of the attendees wore yellow ribbons with "Miss you Mark" written on them, and waited in line after the service was over to express their condolences to Kilroy's parents. The Kilroy family showed deep faith and conviction while speaking to the press. Kilroy's father spoke about the murder and told the press that they were not angry with the killers. He hoped that if and when those responsible for Kilroy's death go to heaven and see their son, they can apologize to him for their wrongdoing. Kilroy's mother told others to pray for the murderers.

On April 15, Kilroy's parents met with U.S. President George H. W. Bush and William Bennett, who headed the Office of National Drug Control Policy. They told the politicians that for every drug consumer, there is a victim who suffers from their addiction. In addition, he stated that drug consumption should be treated with better education, and that the use of drugs, even casually, causes suffering. Bush described the case as "very sensitive", and Bennett stated that Kilroy's murder was mourned nationwide but that the parents were able to turn their suffering to a "very good effort". After the meeting, the parents stated that although Bush and Bennett were not specific on the actions their administration would take to fight drugs and enforce it at a local, state, and federal level, they were satisfied that the government was looking in the "right direction". They praised the efforts of the government in asking citizens what could be done to improve their country. Kilroy's father concluded that change required the government to do its part, but that it also required every citizen of the country to put in their effort to make it happen.

Two weeks after the bodies were exhumed from Santa Elena, the Mexican Federal Police returned to the ranch early in the morning to burn down the shack and lay a wooden cross above the ashes. Reportedly, the police took a curandero (folk-healer) to purify the shack before burning it down. The curandero went inside the house, said a few prayers, sprinkled the floor with salt, and concluded by making the sign of the cross. The policemen then proceeded to spray gasoline around the shack before setting it on fire. The Mexican government offered no official explanation for their actions, but a source close to the investigation stated that the police's motives were supernatural in nature. They said that they knew the shack meant a lot to Constanzo and burning it would make him go insane; "[We] would hit him where it hurts", the police said. The next morning, Constanzo reportedly went into a rage after the arson was shown on national television.

== Manhunt for cult members ==
By murdering Kilroy, Constanzo attracted international attention and forced the Mexican government to focus their efforts on bringing him, and those involved, to justice.

On April 11, 1989, the day the bodies were exhumed from Santa Elena, Constanzo fled to a Holiday Inn in Brownsville before flying from McAllen, Texas, to Mexico City, where he had an apartment. He escaped with Sara Aldrete, Martín Quintana Rodríguez, Omar Francisco Orea Ochoa, and Álvaro de León Valdés ("El Duby"). (Note: His maternal surname is sometimes spelled as "Valdez".)

U.S. and Mexican law enforcement agencies carried out an international manhunt to locate Constanzo and the rest of his cult members. The police believed that Constanzo had possibly fled to Miami to visit his mother, but Constanzo opted for Mexico City, where he hid with several of his followers for short periods of time. Rumors began to surface that Constanzo was seen in Chicago, Illinois; other rumors suggested that Aldrete was spotted in schools throughout the Rio Grande Valley and that she had vowed to kidnap children for every jailed cult member. (Note: Orea Ochoa confessed to the press that Constanzo had ordered the killing of infants and children since 1983.) A convenience store clerk in Clovis, New Mexico, called the police and told them that he had seen a couple matching the description of Constanzo and Aldrete stopping at his store to purchase something. According to investigators, Constanzo was last seen driving a 1989 Mercedes Benz in Brownsville. In Matamoros, law enforcement raided Aldrete's house, where they discovered an altar and several religious images. They also stated that the house's interior was covered with blood. In the Cameron County sheriff's office, authorities released a wanted poster of Constanzo stating that he was "extremely dangerous", and indicted him and Aldrete for aggravated kidnapping. Both were also indicted by a state jury in McAllen, along with 11 other cult members from Contanzo's organization, for importing marijuana, conspiracy to import marijuana, conspiracy to possess with the intent of distributing, and possession with the intent of distributing. (Note: An FBI agent stated that the purpose of the drug indictments was to create a probable cause for a legal arrest in the U.S., so they could be extradited to Mexico for murder.) Cameron County officials also issued arrest warrants for the other cult members who were at large. Although none of the leads proved successful, the police encouraged citizens to continue helping them in their search.

On April 17, Serafín Hernández Rivera Sr., a Brownsville native, was arrested in Houston by DEA and Texas Department of Public Safety agents. Federal charges were filed against him for importing marijuana, possession, and conspiracy. Two other men implicated with him were Quintana Rodríguez and Ponce Torres, both Mexican citizens. As the police searched his Houston home, they seized cash and weapons, but found no evidence of any cult paraphernalia or leads pointing to Constanzo. Houston police believed that Constanzo was probably hiding in Houston because he was linked to a $20 million failed cocaine operation that was busted there in June 1988. When the house was raided, investigators found ritualistic candles, an altar, and paperwork with Rivera's name on it. The police believed that Constanzo bought several properties across Houston in the past and were investigating if he had visited any of his alleged hangouts. Serafín Sr. cooperated with U.S. officials and was sentenced to 18 months in prison. He was released in June 1990 and returned to Brownsville.

On April 17 in Mexico City, the police raided one of Constanzo's properties in Atizapán. They discovered piles of homosexual pornography and a hidden ritual chamber with an altar. This prompted the police to question people in Mexico City's homosexual community to see if they had any leads on Constanzo's whereabouts. The Mexican police stated that no evidence was found at the scene to link Constanzo or his men to any murders committed there. They said they saw altars and other ritualistic belongings, but did not find any traces of blood. No men were arrested at the scene, but the police managed to arrest a lady called María Teresa Quintana Rodríguez, sister of one of Constanzo's lovers and henchmen. The police also discovered that Aldrete's purse and other belongings were left behind, which prompted them to conclude that Constanzo probably murdered her because she knew too much about the inner workings of his cult group. The police stated that they did not see Aldrete with the group when they arrived in Mexico City. They thought that Constanzo might have buried her somewhere in the city. U.S. authorities, however, believed that Aldrete purposely left her belongings behind to confuse investigators and make it appear that she was dead. On April 24, the police arrested Víctor Manuel Antúnez Flores and Salvador Antonio Villaluz, who were hiding in one of Constanzo's properties in the Juárez neighborhood.

=== Death of Constanzo ===
The Mexico City police department noticed that the Matamoros killings were similar to murders carried out in Mexico City between 1987 and 1989. After consulting local witchcraft practitioners and sorcerers, the police heard that Constanzo was probably hiding in Cuauhtémoc, one of the city's boroughs. Another contact told the police that there was an address of interest in the Verónica Anzures neighborhood, next to Cuauhtémoc. The police department sent 16 officers to search the area. At a supermarket, they interrogated a shoemaker who claimed to have seen a woman who matched Aldrete's description. The police then spotted a man at the supermarket who was attempting to buy large amounts of groceries with U.S. dollars. They followed the man and saw that he was living at an apartment on Río Sena. By the end of the week, the police concluded that the man was De León and that he was buying groceries for Constanzo. On May 6, 1989, the police surrounded the building and waited for traffic to subside before raiding the premises. However, a black vehicle pulled up in front of the apartment complex and the police walked over to investigate. Constanzo noticed the police from the window of his apartment and opened fire at the officers who were at ground level. (Note: Another source states that the police were in the area for an unrelated reason. They were searching for a missing child and Constanzo shot at them from his apartment.) Constanzo threw golden coins and paper money from the window, and burned some of his money on a stove. Constanzo eventually ran out of ammunition and began to lose his patience. After about 45 minutes, and worried of his imminent capture, Constanzo ordered De León to kill him and Quintana Rodríguez.

De León hesitated at the beginning, but Constanzo hit him in the face and told him that he would suffer in hell if he did not do as he commanded. Constanzo then hugged Quintana Rodríguez, and De León stood in front of them before he opened fire and killed the two with a machine gun inside a closet. When the police climbed up the stairs and made it to Constanzo's smoke-filled apartment, Aldrete ran from the door screaming that Constanzo was dead. De León later confessed that Constanzo had lost his mind and was saying that "everything was lost" and that "no one was going to have [his] money" when the police raid forced him to barricade himself in his apartment. He also stated that he participated in Kilroy's murder and in other killings at Santa Elena, but both agreed that Constanzo did most of the killings himself. Aldrete denied participation in the killings and stated that she was unaware of them until she saw the victims on national television. She said she was sorry to hear about Kilroy's murder. She stated that she was not an official member of the cult and was barely going through the initiation. In addition, she stated she was held prisoner during Constanzo's hiding in Mexico City. (Note: Aldrete claimed to have thrown a written note from Constanzo's apartment saying she was being held prisoner and asked whoever read it to call the police.) When asked if she was in love with Constanzo, she denied it and said that she was only his follower.

At the scene, the police took Aldrete, De León, Orea Ochoa, Juan Carlos Fragoso, and Jorge Montes into custody. (Note: Montes is also known as Salvador Antonio Gutiérrez Juárez. Another source states he was arrested on May 10 in Zona Rosa, Mexico City.) The police also arrested María de Lourdes Güero López and María del Rocío Cuevas Guerra, other cultists under Constanzo, in Mexico City later that day. They were renting one of Constanzo's apartments. The individuals arrested that day were held for homicide, criminal association, wounding an officer, and damage to property. Fearing that Constanzo might have purposely faked his own death, investigators conducted fingerprint analysis. They concluded that the corpse was indeed Constanzo's. Constanzo's 9mm Uzi submachine gun and his supposed suitcase were never formally presented by the police as seized items. On May 15, a judge refused to set bail for the individuals arrested that day because they were wanted for crimes accumulating over 50 years in prison.

== Criminal sentences ==
On August 27, 1989, Orea Ochoa was admitted to a hospital in Santa Martha Acatitla after being diagnosed with AIDS. (Note: According to Sara Aldrete's autobiography, Orea Ochoa was injected with the virus while in prison and told her that he did not have HIV/AIDS prior to that.) The police said that he and Aldrete were Constanzo's lovers, but that Aldrete showed no signs of the disease in her immune system. He died on February 11, 1990.

On June 2, 1989, Salvador Vidal García Alarcón, a police chief of the Federal Judicial Police, was indicted for drug trafficking. He was linked to Constanzo by Aldrete and other cult members who claimed he acted as the group's contact in the police. Aldrete said that Constanzo told her that he had killed two men to favor García Alarcón. The police chief, however, defended his stance and stated that Alarcón's involvement with Constanzo was merely religious; he said that he was possessed with spirits at a young age and sought Constanzo for help. He was not charged with Kilroy's murder or for any other killings conducted by Constanzo's group.

In August 1990, De León was sentenced to 30 years in prison for killing Constanzo and Quintana Rodríguez. Fragosa and Montes were convicted of a separate murder charge and sentenced to 35 years in prison. Reyes Bustamante, the ranch caretaker, was accused in court of cover-up; he was released from prison on December 11, 1990, after paying a bond of US$500.

On June 10, 1993, drug trafficking charges against Ovidio and Ponce Torres were dropped in the U.S without a stated reason. On May 3, 1994, Aldrete was sentenced to 62 years in prison. Cult members Elio, Serafín Jr., Martínez Salinas, and Serna Valdez, received 67 years each. In an interview with the press, Kilroy's parents stated that they were relieved to hear that the cultists were sentenced. The charges were multiple homicide (31 years), possession of narcotics (12 years), involvement in organized crime (5 years), police impersonation (2 years), illegal body desecration (2 years), illegal possession of firearms (10 years), and illegal possession of weapons exclusive to the Mexican Armed Forces (5 years). The Mexican federal judge explained that the reason Aldrete received fewer years in prison than the rest was because she was not charged with using weapons that were military-exclusive, which carries a five-year maximum sentence. He also stated that the maximum conviction a person in Mexico can receive for capital murder is 50 years. Since Mexico's judicial system does not have parole, it allows for prisoners to file motions at an appeal court to reduce their sentences after several years. Whether this condition is denied or granted, inmates can then push for a writ of amparo.

On March 27, 1998, a Mexican federal court reduced the sentences of Elio, Serna Valdez, and Martínez Salinas by 17 years, lowering their sentences from 67 total years to 50. Since the death penalty and life sentences are not part of Mexico's judicial system, reductions for charges that are over 50 years are common. In addition, individuals like the cult members, who were charged with murder and other serious crimes that push the total punishment sum above 50 years for capital murder, often have their sentences reduced by an appeal court. If the individuals were first-time offenders, as the cult members were, an appeals court may determine that it is reasonable to reduce their sentences. Elio was sent to a prison in Ciudad Victoria, Tamaulipas. The other two were sent to Federal Social Readaptation Center No. 1 in Almoloya, State of Mexico.

As of 2009, only two suspects remained at large, Ovidio and Ponce Torres, and were wanted for Kilroy's murder in Mexico. (Note: Ponce Torres was once pulled over by sheriff deputies in Brownsville who were investigating a house. He was allowed to go freely. His name had not yet been shared with them by Mexican authorities.)

=== Claims of innocence ===
Aldrete spoke to the press in 2003 and denied her participation in Kilroy's murder and in the cult killings. She stated that it was impossible for investigators to understand what had happened at Santa Elena because the biggest evidence in the case, Constanzo, was dead. Aldrete also stated that the police hid the names of famous people involved with Constanzo for their own convenience. She concluded by stating that she believed in God and was not going to ask society for forgiveness because she was innocent of the crimes. The following year, Aldrete interviewed with the press again and stated that she had been tortured to confess. She said she had been stripped naked, blindfolded, beaten upside down, and then had her toenails yanked. Aldrete claimed she was beaten so severely that doctors told her she would never be able to have children.

In the early 2000s, she published an autobiography where she detailed how she met Constanzo and the group, her experiences when she was allegedly taken hostage by Constanzo, her mistreatment by authorities, and her versions of the story. Aldrete claimed she visited Constanzo in Mexico City and was then taken hostage after Constanzo decided to not let her go because he believed that she would go to the police and tell them where they were hiding. She claimed that Constanzo and the rest of the group were unaware of the killings that occurred in Matamoros until they found out that the police were looking for them, but went into hiding nonetheless because they feared for their lives. She detailed her alleged mistreatment in jail, and how she underwent beatings, psychological torture, rape, and an unfair trial. Her version of Constanzo's death was different than the official one; she stated that Constanzo was executed by the police when they raided the apartment. She also questioned the police's decision to burn down the shack in Santa Elena, since it was crucial for the investigation and probably contained the fingerprints of the murderers.

In an interview with the press in 2014, Serafín and Martínez Salinas gave their versions of the story and proclaimed their innocence. Serafín stated that the Federal Judicial Police commander Juan Benítez Ayala found Serafín guilty because he was related to Elio and Ovidio. He said he was not arrested at the ranch, but rather at Elio's in-law's house in Matamoros. He said he grew up in Houston and moved to Brownsville for college, and that he was in Matamoros visiting his family when he was taken by the police. Serafín said he had been tortured by the Mexican and U.S. police in Matamoros to confess his participation in Kilroy's murder and in the killings at Santa Elena. He said he was allegedly beaten and told that he and his family would be killed if he spoke English during his declaration. He said he was a student of Texas Southmost College and knew who Aldrete was, but did not have any connection with her. Serafín also stated that he had never met Constanzo and had no idea his family ranch was a gathering place for his cult. He said that he had never dug up the bodies and had been taken to the ranch after the bodies were already exhumed.

Martínez Salinas, on the other hand, stated that he was forced to confess because he was a neighbor at Santa Elena and driver of the Hernández family. He said he had been beaten and taken to the ranch where he was told to pose with the exhumed bodies. When asked if he had ever met Constanzo, he stated that he had seen him in person at the ranch with the Hernándezes but never talked to him. Martínez Salinas said he was arrested one afternoon at Elio's in-law's house when he was looking for a part for his car. He said he had known Aldrete years before, since he had dated one of her sisters when he was young. He said that he had never heard Aldrete talk about the cult. He said she had talked about her school and marriage. He also said that Elio and Ovidio never invited him to the cult or talked to him about it.

== Legacy ==
Two months after Kilroy was confirmed dead, his parents founded the Mark Kilroy Foundation which promotes drug awareness, education, and prevention through the "Just Say No" campaign. Since Kilroy's dream was to become a doctor after college, his parents decided to help others and continue his dream through this program. Since 1994, the foundation has sponsored and worked alongside Substance Abuse Free Environment (SAFE), a non-profit community group that promotes awareness for substance abuse and drug prevention. Both of them partner with the Santa Fe local government, its school system, and the ones nearby, and with businesses and private donors, to provide programs for the entire year. The full-time and part-time counselors visit school campuses during the academic year in Santa Fe and Hitchcock to hold programs for approximately 800 students regularly. When students are gone for the summer, the foundation conducts programs in summer camps by partnering with volunteers. They offer free outdoor activities like archery, golf, fishing, tennis, and swimming. An average of 550 youth participate in these programs every summer.

According to Kilroy's father, the purpose of these summer activities is to keep the youth occupied when they are not in school so they do not get bored and think about consuming drugs. In September 1999, the foundation signed an agreement with the U.S. Federal government to receive ten yearly grants of $100,000. By the tenth year, the government intended to stop the funding and expect the foundation to be self-supporting. However, Kilroy's parents stated that the yearly expenses exceeded $160,000 and that they would need to find new ways to make up the deficit. The Mark Kilroy Foundation was one of the five non-profit organizations in Galveston County that receives proceeds from a bingo place in La Marque, Texas. They also receive proceeds from sales of the book Sacrifice, written by Kilroy's father and Bob Stewart in 1990.

Besides counseling children and teenagers with drug advice, Kilroy's parents also advise young people who plan to travel for spring break, suggesting to stay in groups, keep an eye on each other and not wander off on their own. They also suggest tourists be aware of travel warnings and abide by foreign laws and regulations when they travel outside the U.S., though they reiterated that people can get hurt in the U.S. too.

== Aftermath ==
After Kilroy was confirmed dead, the media framed the drug group and their religious practices as Satanist. For the most part, the U.S. media labeled the group as Satanist and gave little mention to the drug-related violence that was widespread in northern Mexico, thus failing to provide a wider picture of what happened at Matamoros. Reports concluded that because human body parts were found inside a large metal pot, the group practiced cannibalism. Some journalists made the error of attributing cannibalism with the common mistake of satanist groups sacrificing and eating human remains. Other writers, however, stated that Constanzo believed in Kadiempembe, the devil in Palo Mayombe. In addition, some occult writers believed that the nature of Kilroy's murder, which included mutilation and clandestine burial, were part of occult tradition.

When media coverage and allegations of Constanzo's affinity towards Satanism died down, several Afro-Cuban scholars stated that Constanzo's actions were fueled by his personal conviction and psychopathic involvement with Palo Mayombe. They argued that Constanzo used Palo Mayombe for his own financial, illicit, and psychological needs by convincing his cult members to help further his drug trafficking operations. Through human sacrifice, Constanzo promised his members that they were protected from the law. Other Afro-Cuban scholars, on the other hand, alleged that Constanzo murdered Kilroy because he truly believed it was a requirement in his distorted view of Palo Mayombe. From this point of view, Constanzo's actions and what happened in Matamoros could happen anywhere.

On the 20th anniversary of their son's murder, Kilroy's parents visited the Rio Grande Valley and Matamoros to thank the people who had supported them in their search for their son. Kilroy's father stated that people were supportive and called the police whenever they saw something suspicious that they thought was related to their son's disappearance. He said that it was easier to overcome their son's death because of the support they received. Kilroy's mother said she received a cross from a Brownsville woman when she was searching for her son in 1989. "It's a reminder every time that I know that the Lord was involved in everything", she said, while she touched and showed the cross around her neck.

== In media ==
=== Podcasts ===
- Morbid podcast- "The Matamoros Devil Murders" (Parts 1 and 2)
- Darkness podcast- "Spring Break in Mexico | The Mark Kilroy story"
- Casefile True Crime podcast- "Case 123: Mark Kilroy"
- Murder in America podcast- "Ep.151:Mexico- The Satanic Cult Murder of Mark Kilroy"
- Gruesome: Horrific True Crime podcast- "Mark Kilroy"
- Paranormia podcast- "Cult Murder: The Disappearance of Mark Kilroy
- Ray William Johnson: True Story podcast- "Kidnapped by a Drug Cult- The Mark Kilroy story"
- Dark Poutine podcast- "Road Trip: Los Satanicos - the Murder of Mark Kilroy"
- Wicked and Grim: a True Crime Podcast- "The Satanic Ritual Murder of Mark Kilroy"
- The Misery Machine podcast- "The Case of Mark Kilroy"

== Bibliography ==
- Aldrete, Sara (2013). Me dicen la narcosatánica (in Spanish). Penguin Random House. p. 200. ISBN 978-6073117999.
- Arellano, Antonio (1992). Fuera de la Ley (in Spanish). Ediciones Cal y Arena. p. 160. ISBN 9684932316.
- Berger, Helen A. (2006). Witchcraft and Magic: Contemporary North America. University of Pennsylvania Press. p. 207. ISBN 0812219716.
- Doreste, Tomás (1995). Los narcosatánicos de Matamoros y otros crímenes espeluznantes (in Spanish). Planeta Group. p. 279. ISBN 968406554X.
- Dyrendal, Asbjorn; Lewis, James R.; Petersen, Jesper Aa. (2015). The Invention of Satanism. Oxford University Press. p. 272. ISBN 978-0199720606.
- Fanthorpe, R. Lionel; Fanthorpe, Patricia (2008). Mysteries and Secrets of Voodoo, Santeria, and Obeah. Dundurn. p. 253. ISBN 978-1550027846.
- Fox, James Alan (1994). Overkill: Mass Murder and Serial Killing Exposed. Plenum Press. p. 267. ISBN 0306447711.
- Fox, James Alan; Levin, Jack (2005). Extreme Killing: Understanding Serial and Mass Murder. SAGE Publications. p. 290. ISBN 0761988572.
- Greig, Charlotte (2010). Evil Serial Killers: In the Minds of Monsters. Arcturus Publishing. p. 208. ISBN 978-1848371422.
- Hicks, Robert D. (1991). In Pursuit of Satan: The Police and the Occult. Prometheus Books. p. 420. ISBN 0879756047.
- Humes, Edward (2014). Buried Secrets: A True Story of Serial Murder. Diversion Books. p. 400. ISBN 978-1626812550.
- Kilroy, Jim; Stewart, Bob (1990). Sacrifice: The Tragic Cult Murder of Mark Kilroy in Matamoros: a Father's Determination to Turn Evil Into Good. World Publications, Original from Indiana University. p. 202. ISBN 0849907837.
- Kosh, Jeffrey (2014). Spirits and Thought Forms: Tales from Prosperity Glades. Lulu.com. p. 120. ISBN 978-1105620478.
- Lewis, James R. (2001). Satanism Today. ABC-CLIO. p. 371. ISBN 1576072924.
- Linedecker, Clifford L. (1989). Hell Ranch: The Nightmare Tale of Voodoo, Drugs & Death in Matamoros. Eakins Press. p. 180. ISBN 0890157340.
- Little, Brown Book Group (2006). Cannibals and Evil Cult Killers: The Most Unthinkable and Heinous Crimes. The Quarto Group. p. 575. ISBN 0316732532.
- Mandelsberg, Rose G. (1991). Cult killers. Kensington Publishing Corporation. p. 440. ISBN 1558175288.
- Maril, Robert Lee (2006). Patrolling Chaos: The U.S. Border Patrol in Deep South Texas. Texas Tech University Press. p. 368. ISBN 0896725944.
- Medway, Gareth (2001). Lure of the Sinister: The Unnatural History of Satanism. NYU Press. p. 465. ISBN 081475645X.
- Miletich, John J. (2003). Homicide Investigation: An Introduction. Scarecrow Press. p. 295. ISBN 081084625X.
- Monsiváis, Carlos (1994). Los mil y un velorios: crónica de la nota roja (in Spanish). Consejo Nacional para la Cultura y las Artes. p. 96. ISBN 968391067X.
- Nash, Jay Robert (2004). The Great Pictorial History of World Crime (Volume 2). Scarecrow Press. p. 1200. ISBN 1461712157.
- Newton, Michael (2006). The Encyclopedia of Serial Killers (2nd ed.). Infobase Publishing. p. 515. ISBN 0816069875.
- Noblitt, James Randall; Noblitt, Pamela Perskin (2014). Cult and Ritual Abuse: Narratives, Evidence, and Healing Approaches (3rd ed.). ABC-CLIO. p. 338. ISBN 978-1440831492.
- Perlmutter, Dawn (2003). Investigating Religious Terrorism and Ritualistic Crimes. Taylor & Francis. p. 453. ISBN 0849310342.
- Peters, Ted (1998). Sin: Radical Evil in Soul and Society. Wipf and Stock Publishers. p. 348. ISBN 157910181X.
- Provost, Gary (1989). Across the Border: The True Story of the Satanic Cult Killings in Matamoros, Mexico. Pocket Books. p. 256. ISBN 0671693190.
- Ross, Colin A. (1995). Satanic Ritual Abuse: Principles of Treatment. University of Toronto Press. p. 228. ISBN 0802073573.
- Schutze, Jim (1989). Cauldron of Blood: The Matamoros Cult Killings. Avon Books. p. 248. ISBN 0380759977.
- Shreeve, Jimmy (2015). Human Sacrifice: A Shocking Expos of Ritual Killings Worldwide. Skyhorse Publishing. p. 344. ISBN 978-1629149981.
- Snow, Robert L. (2003). Deadly Cults: The Crimes of True Believers. Greenwood Publishing Group. p. 237. ISBN 0275980529.
- Tillman, Laura (2016). The Long Shadow of Small Ghosts: Murder and Memory in an American City. Simon and Schuster. p. 256. ISBN 978-1501104305.
