= Religion (disambiguation) =

Religion is any cultural system of designated behaviors and practices, world views, texts, sanctified places, ethics, or organizations, that relate humanity to the supernatural or transcendental.

Religion may also refer to:

- Religion (virtue), a concept in Christian theology and ethics
- Religion (journal), an academic journal published by Routledge
- Religions (journal), an academic journal published by MDPI
- Religion (Niagara album), 1990
- Religion (Spear of Destiny album), 1997
- "Religion", a song by Lana Del Rey from Honeymoon, 2015
- "Religion", a song by Skylar Grey from Don't Look Down, 2013
- The Religion, a 1982 novel by Nicholas Conde
- "Religion" (Master of None), a 2017 TV episode
- "Religion" (Serial Experiments Lain), a 1998 TV episode
- "Religion" (Stewart Lee's Comedy Vehicle), a 2009 TV episode

== See also ==
- "Religious" (song), by R. Kelly, 2009
- Mythology, a body or collection of myths
