= In the Deep Woods =

- Genre: Crime; Thriller
- Based on: In the Deep Woods by Nicholas Condé
- Written by: Robert Nathan; Robert Rosenblum
- Directed by: Charles Correll
- Starring: Rosanna Arquette; Anthony Perkins; Will Patton; D. W. Moffett
- Music by: Sylvester Levay
- Country of origin: United States
- Original language: English

Production
- Executive producers: Joel Fields; Ron Gilbert
- Producer: Frederic Golchan
- Production location: San Diego
- Cinematography: James Glennon
- Editor: Mark W. Rosenbaum
- Running time: 95 minutes
- Production companies: Frederic Golchan Productions; Leonard Hill Films

Original release
- Network: NBC
- Release: October 26, 1992

In the Deep Woods is a 1992 American made-for-television crime thriller film starring Rosanna Arquette, Anthony Perkins, Will Patton and D.W. Moffett. It was directed by Charles Correll and premiered on NBC on October 26, 1992. The film marked the final film role of Perkins, who died a month before its release.

== Plot ==
Joanna Warren is a children's book author whose life unravels when a childhood friend is brutally murdered by the vicious Deep Woods Killer, a serial murderer preying upon successful career women. As Joanna is drawn deeper in a tangled web of violence and deceit, she becomes an unwitting pawn in a deadly game between the elusive killer and Paul Miller, an eerie private investigator with his own motives for solving the case.

== Cast ==
- Rosanna Arquette as Joanna Warren
- Anthony Perkins as Paul Miller, P.I.
- Will Patton as Eric Gaines
- D. W. Moffett as Frank McCarry
- Chris Rydell as Tommy Warren
- Amy Ryan as Beth
- Beth Broderick as Myra Cantrell
- Harold Sylvester as George Dunaway
- Kimberly Beck as Margot

== Production ==
The film was shot on location in San Diego, California in March 1992.
