= The White Tiger (Nathan novel) =

1987 novel by Robert Stuart Nathan

- First edition
- Author: Robert Stuart Nathan
- Language: English
- Genre: Political thriller, mystery fiction
- Publisher: Simon & Schuster
- Publication date: August 1987
- Publication place: United States
- Media type: Print (hardcover)
- Pages: 431
- ISBN: 978-0-671-63338-7
- OCLC: 17383738
- Dewey Decimal: 813/.54 19
- LC Class: PS3564.A8495 W4 1987b

The White Tiger is a 1987 political thriller novel by American author Robert Stuart Nathan. Set in Beijing in post-Mao China during early economic reform, story follows honest police official investigating suspicious death of mentor, uncovering secrets from Long March and Chinese Communist Revolution. The novel structured in four parts, each titled after a Chinese proverb.

== Plot summary ==
In 1980s Beijing, Lu Hong serves as Assistant Deputy Director in municipal Public Security Bureau. Honest despite shifting party currents, Hong shaken when friend, boss, and mentor Sun Sheng dies under mysterious circumstances officially classified as natural. Sheng was veteran revolutionary of Long March alongside Mao Zedong, associated with Hong's parents during Communist encampment in Yan'an during 1930s–1940s.

Before Sheng's death, Hong ordered to surveil Peter Ostrander, visiting American physician and psychiatrist suspected of espionage. Hong opens unofficial inquiry into Sheng's death, discovering Ostrander case links to web of conspiracies involving high-ranking party figures known as revolutionary "Tigers". With assistant Liu Chan, Hong traces bureaucratic infighting, revolution-era treachery, and tensions from Deng Xiaoping market reforms and anti-"spiritual pollution" campaigns. As witnesses die, Hong faces corruption reaching top state levels.

== Main characters ==
- Lu Hong: Assistant Deputy Director of Public Security in Beijing; investigates mentor's death.
- Sun Sheng: Long March veteran, senior official, Hong's mentor; death initiates probe.
- Liu Chan: Hong's police assistant.
- Cui Chun: Hong's mother, revolutionary cadre.
- Lu Yaomin: Hong's father, early revolutionary.
- Ma Sufei: Widow of Sun Sheng.
- Peter Ostrander: Visiting American doctor placed under state surveillance.
- Wei Ye: Bureau director tied to state security apparatus.

== Background and themes ==
Novel depicts mid-1980s China under Deng Xiaoping: market liberalization mixed with political rigidity and anti-crime drives. Core themes: bureaucratic factionalism, corruption among veteran cadres, historical cover-ups of Yan'an period, and generational divide between Long March veterans and younger officials.

== Reception ==
The White Tiger named New York Times Notable Book of the Year for 1987. Selected as Book of the Month Club alternate.

In The New York Times Book Review, China scholar Jerome Alan Cohen praised authentic depiction of Chinese bureaucratic politics, legal apparatus, and forensic realities. Publishers Weekly praised realistic handling of Peking bureaucracy and called Hong sympathetic lead, noting minor prose stiffness in secondary cast. Rex E. Klett of Library Journal praised atmospheric setting of modernizing Beijing amid changing policy, though noted leisurely plot complications.
