= Sara Aldrete =

Mexican serial killer known as "La Madrina"

Sara María Aldrete
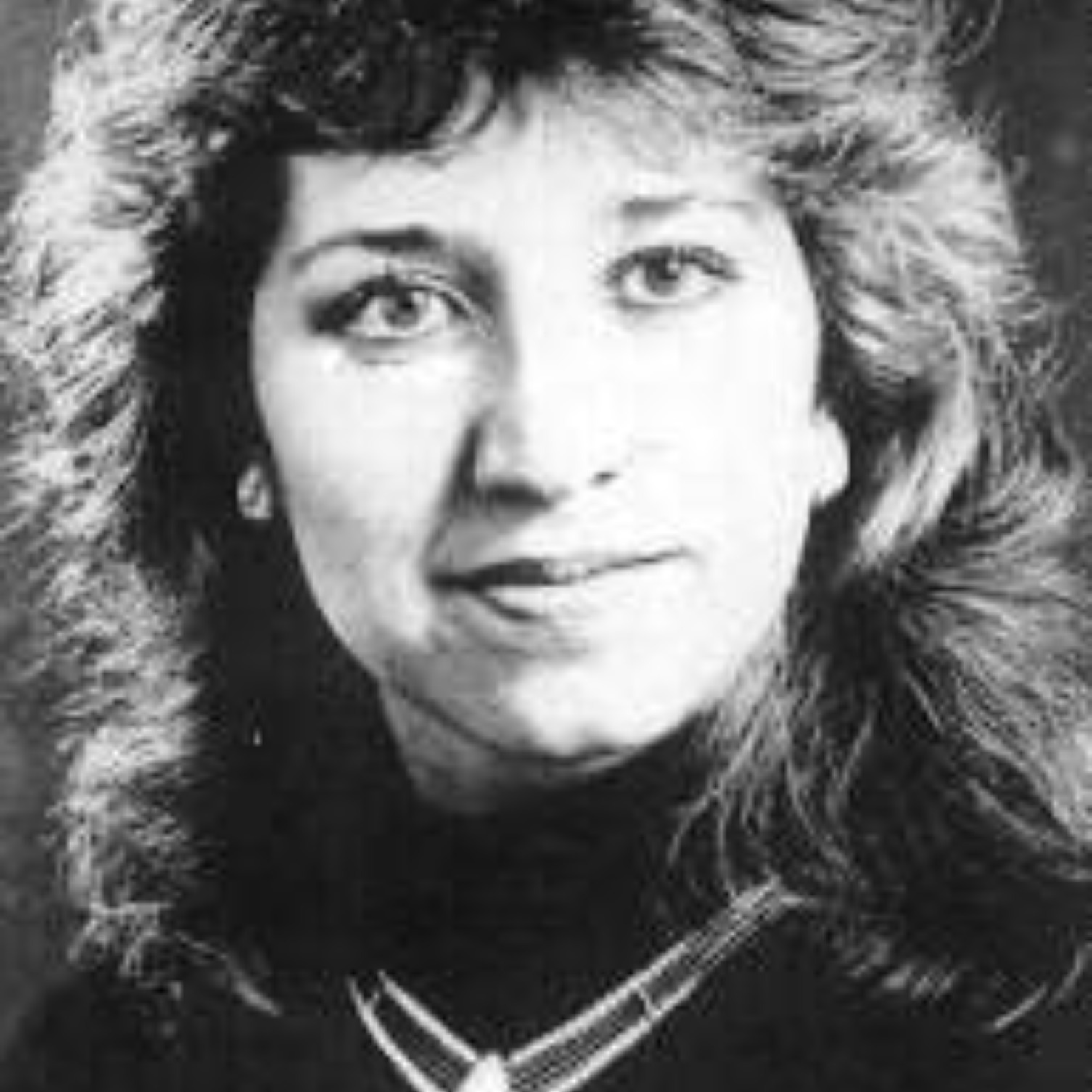
- Born: Sara María Aldrete Villareal; September 6, 1964 (age 62); Matamoros, Tamaulipas, Mexico
- Other name: La Madrina
- Spouse: Miguel Zacharias (m. 1983; div. 1984)
- Penalty: 45 years in prison

Details
- Victims: 16 confirmed, suspected to be 26
- Span of crimes: 1986–1989
- Country: Mexico
- State: Tamaulipas

Sara María Aldrete Villareal (born September 6, 1964) is a Mexican serial killer who was convicted of murder while heading a drug-smuggling and human sacrifice cult with Adolfo Constanzo. The members of the cult, dubbed by the media as The Narcosatanists (Spanish: "Los Narcosatánicos"), called her The Godmother ("La Madrina"), with Constanzo as "The Godfather" ("El Padrino"). The cult was involved in multiple ritualistic killings in Matamoros, Tamaulipas, including the murder of Mark Kilroy, an American student killed in Matamoros in 1989. She received a sentence of 62 years.

== Early life and education ==
Born in Matamoros, Tamaulipas, she attended high school in Brownsville, Texas, while still living south of the border, and gained resident alien status so she could attend Texas Southmost College. She was known among her peers as a good student. She is 6 ft 1 in (1.85 m) tall and studied physical education, preparing to transfer to a university to earn a teaching certification in physical education.

== Background ==
Adolfo Constanzo, a Cuban American serial killer and religious cult leader, introduced her to witchcraft and dark magic. He gave her the nickname "La Madrina", Spanish for "godmother", and initiated her into his cult, which was a conglomeration of Santería, Aztec warrior ritual, and Palo Mayombe, complete with blood sacrifices. Constanzo sexually assaulted and killed drug dealers and used their body parts for religious sacrifice ceremonies in an old warehouse near Matamoros. Many of his victims' body parts were cooked in a large pot called a nganga. Constanzo made Sara Aldrete second-in-command of his cult, and directed her to supervise his followers while he was shipping marijuana over the border into the U.S.

=== Killings ===
In 1989, the killings grew more frequent and gained attention when American tourist Mark J. Kilroy, a University of Texas student on Spring Break, was abducted. Constanzo, Aldrete and the rest of the cult went on the run when detectives discovered their 'shrine'. They found human hair, brains, teeth, and skulls at the site of the murders. Eventually, the police found their hideout in Mexico City on May 6, 1989. After a shootout, Constanzo and one of his accomplices were shot and killed by another member of the cult, apparently at Constanzo's behest. Aldrete was convicted of criminal association in 1990 and jailed for six years. In a second trial, she was convicted of several of the killings at the cult's headquarters, and sentenced to 30 years in prison. If Aldrete is ever released from prison, American authorities plan to prosecute her for the murder of Mark Kilroy.

== See also ==
- List of serial killers by country
- List of serial killers by number of victims
