= Adolfo Constanzo =

American serial killer (1962–1989)

- Born: Adolfo de Jesús Constanzo; November 1, 1962; Miami, Florida, U.S.
- Died: May 6, 1989 (aged 26); Mexico City, Mexico
- Cause of death: Assisted suicide via gunshot wound to the face
- Other names: The Godfather of Matamoros (El Padrino de Matamoros); The Witch Doctor; The Narcosatanist

Details
- Victims: 16 confirmed, 26 suspected
- Span of crimes: 1986–1989
- Country: Mexico

Adolfo de Jesús Constanzo (November 1, 1962 – May 6, 1989), also known as the "Narcosatanist", was a Cuban-American serial killer, drug trafficker, and cult leader who led an infamous drug-trafficking and occult gang in Matamoros, Tamaulipas, Mexico, that was dubbed the Narcosatanists (Spanish: Los Narcosatánicos) by the media. His cult members nicknamed him The Godfather (El Padrino). Constanzo led the cult with Sara Aldrete, whom followers nicknamed "The Godmother" (La Madrina). The cult was involved in multiple ritualistic killings in Matamoros, including the murder of Mark Kilroy, an American student abducted, tortured and killed in the area in 1989.

== Early life ==
Adolfo Constanzo was born in Miami, Florida, to Delia Aurora González, a Cuban immigrant in 1962. She gave birth to Adolfo at the age of 15 and eventually had three children, by different fathers. Delia moved to San Juan, Puerto Rico, after her first husband died and remarried there. Constanzo was baptized Catholic and served as an altar boy, but also accompanied his mother on trips to Haiti to learn about Haitian Vodou.

Constanzo's family returned to Miami in 1972 and his stepfather died soon after, leaving the family with some money. As a teenager, he became apprenticed to a local sorcerer and began to practice a religion called Palo Mayombe, which involves animal sacrifice. Delia remarried and his new stepfather was involved in both the religion and drug dealing. Constanzo and his mother were arrested numerous times for theft, vandalism and shoplifting. He graduated from high school, but was expelled from prep school.

As an adult, Constanzo moved to Mexico City and met the men who were to become his followers: Martín Quintana, Jorge Montes and Omar Orea. They began to run a profitable business casting spells to bring good luck, which involved expensive ritual sacrifices of chickens, goats, snakes, zebras and even lion cubs. Many of his clients were rich drug dealers and hitmen who enjoyed the violence of Constanzo's "magical" displays. He also attracted other rich members of Mexican society, including several high-ranking corrupt policemen who introduced him to the city's powerful drug cartels. His cult was said to be associated with the notable Gulf Cartel.

Constanzo started to raid graveyards for human bones to put in his nganga, or cauldron. Before long, his cult decided that the spirits of the dead that resided in the nganga would be stronger (providing the cult more powerful protection) with live human sacrifices instead of old bones. The resulting killings soon totalled more than twenty victims, whose mutilated bodies were found in and around Mexico City. This process escalated until Constanzo eventually decided that the gang needed the power of a brain from an American student, culminating with the 1989 murder of Mark Kilroy.

== Murders ==
Constanzo began to believe that his magic, much of which he took from Palo Mayombe, was responsible for the success of the cartels and demanded to become a full business partner with one of the most powerful families he knew, the Calzadas. When his demand was rejected, seven family members disappeared. Their bodies turned up later with fingers, toes, ears, brains and even (in one case) the spine missing. Constanzo soon made friends with a new cartel, the Hernandez brothers. He also took up with a young woman named Sara Aldrete, who became the high priestess of the cult. Constanzo made Aldrete second-in-command of his cult and directed her to supervise his followers while he was shipping marijuana over the border into the US.

In 1988, Constanzo moved to Rancho Santa Elena, a house in the desert. It is there where he carried out more sadistic ritual murders, sometimes of strangers and other times of rival drug dealers. He also used the ranch to store huge shipments of cocaine and marijuana.

On March 13, 1989, Constanzo's henchmen abducted a pre-med student, Mark Kilroy, from outside a Mexican bar and took him back to the ranch. Kilroy was a US citizen who had been in Mexico on spring break. When Kilroy was brought to the ranch, Constanzo murdered him. Under pressure from Texan politicians, Mexican police initially picked up four of Constanzo's followers, including two of the Hernandez brothers. Police quickly discovered the cult and that Constanzo had been responsible for Kilroy's death; he sought a "good/superior brain" for one of his ritual spells. Officers raided the ranch and discovered Constanzo's cauldron, which contained various items such as a dead black cat and a human brain. Fifteen mutilated corpses were dug up at the ranch, one of them Kilroy's. Officials said Kilroy was killed by Constanzo with a machete chop to the back of the neck when Kilroy tried to escape about 12 hours after being taken to the ranch.

== Death ==
Constanzo fled to Mexico City with four of his followers. They were only discovered when police were called to the apartment because of an unrelated dispute taking place there. As the officers approached, Constanzo, mistakenly believing they had located him, opened fire with a machine gun. This brought in police reinforcements. Determined not to go to prison, he handed the gun to follower Álvaro de León and ordered him to open fire on him and Martín Quintana. By the time police reached the apartment, both Constanzo and Quintana were dead. De León, known as "El Duby", and Sara Aldrete were immediately arrested.

A total of 14 cult members were charged with a range of crimes, from murder and drug-running to obstructing the course of justice. Sara Aldrete, Elio Hernández and Serafín Hernández were convicted of multiple murders and were ordered to serve prison sentences of over 60 years each. De León was given a 30-year term. If co-leader Aldrete is ever released from prison, American authorities plan to prosecute her for the murder of Mark Kilroy.

== See also ==
- List of serial killers by country
- List of serial killers by number of victims
