= The Religion =

1982 novel by Nicholas Conde

- First edition
- Author: Nicholas Conde
- Language: English
- Genre: Horror novel
- Publisher: New American Library
- Publication date: 1982
- Publication place: United States
- Media type: Print (Paperback)
- Pages: 355 pp
- ISBN: 0-451-12119-8
- OCLC: 9527268

The Religion is a horror novel written in 1982 by Nicholas Conde. It explores the ritual sacrifice of children to appease the pantheon of voodoo deities, through the currently used practice of Santería.

The novel served as the basis for the 1987 feature film The Believers.
