= Robert Stuart Nathan =

American writer and film producer

Robert Nathan
- Born: Robert Stuart Nathan; August 13, 1948 (age 78); Johnstown, Pennsylvania
- Occupations: Novelist; journalist; screenwriter; director; author; television producer

Robert Stuart Nathan (born August 13, 1948), usually credited as Robert Nathan, is an American novelist, journalist, screenwriter, director, and television producer.

== Early life ==
Nathan was born in Johnstown, Pennsylvania, and was raised in Clayton, Missouri. His father was a toy wholesaler and his mother an accountant. He graduated from Amherst College. He began his career in politics and print journalism, then joined the reporting staff of National Public Radio’s All Things Considered, first as New York Bureau Chief and subsequently as White House Correspondent and occasional weekend anchor. He has been a contributor to many magazines, including The New Republic, Harper's, Cosmopolitan, The New York Times Book Review, The Nation, and elsewhere.

== Career ==
=== Novels ===
Nathan is the author of four novels, including the political thriller The White Tiger, a New York Times Notable Book of the Year and a Book of the Month Club selection published in seventeen languages. The New York Times called the book “exciting, rare, and authentic.” As half of the thriller-writing team published under the pseudonym Nicholas Condé, he is co-author of three novels, including The Religion, which was filmed as The Believers by John Schlesinger (Midnight Cowboy, Marathon Man), and In the Deep Woods, the basis for a television film starring Rosanna Arquette and Anthony Perkins in his last role.

=== Television ===
Nathan began working in episodic television on the original staff of Law & Order'. He was subsequently on the original staff of ER as Co-Executive Producer and for that show received the industry’s coveted George Foster Peabody Award. His television credits include Executive Producer and showrunner, Law & Order: Criminal Intent; Co-Executive Producer, Law & Order; Co-Executive Producer, Law & Order: SVU; Co-Executive Producer, Dragnet; Executive Producer and showrunner, ABC’s Women's Murder Club; Consulting Producer, USA’s Fairly Legal; Consulting Producer, FX’s Dirt; Executive Producer, showrunner, and co-creator, NBC’s Prince Street; and Executive Producer and showrunner, CBS’s The Client. For episodes of Law & Order and its sequels he received an Edgar Award nomination from the Mystery Writers of America, four Emmy nominations and a Humanitas Award nomination as a producer, The Shine Award, The Silver Gavel Award, and the GLAAD Media Award. For Paramount Television he was Executive Producer of James Ellroy’s L.A. Sheriff's Homicide. In the 23-year history of the Law & Order franchise, the 1993 episode “Manhood,” from Nathan's teleplay with a story co-written by Walon Green, holds the only Emmy nomination in the category Outstanding Writing for A Drama Series.

=== Film ===
In 2012 he directed the film Lucky Bastard, for which he co-wrote the script and for which he was also, with his writing partner Lukas Kendall, an Executive Producer. The film premiered In Europe in competition at the Monaco Film Festival in May, 2013, where it received The Special Jury Prize and Best Screenplay Award.

== Filmography ==
=== Writer ===
| Year | Show | Episode | Notes |
|---|---|---|---|
| 1990 | Law and Order | "The Reaper's Helper" | Teleplay - Season 1, Episode 3 |
| 1990 | Law and Order | "Kiss the Girls and Make Them Die" | Teleplay - Season 1, Episode 4 |
| 1990 | Law and Order | "Happily Ever After" | Teleplay - Season 1, Episode 5 |
| 1990 | Law and Order | "Prisoner of Love" | Story/Teleplay - Season 1, Episode 10 |
| 1991 | Law and Order | "Life Choice" | Teleplay - Season 1, Episode 12 |
| 1991 | Law and Order | "The Secret Sharers" | Season 3, Episode 18 |
| 1991 | Law and Order | "The Serpent's Tooth" | Teleplay - Season 1, Episode 19 |
| 1991 | Law and Order | "The Blue Wall" | Story/Teleplay - Season 1, Episode 22 |
| 1991 | Law and Order | "The Wages of Love" | Story - Season 2, Episode 2 |
| 1991 | Law and Order | "God Bless the Child" | Season 2, Episode 5 |
| 1991 | Law and Order | "In Memory Of" | Teleplay - Season 2, Episode 7 |
| 1991 | Law and Order | "Out of Control" | Story - Season 2, Episode 8 |
| 1991 | Law and Order | "His Hour Upon the Stage" | Teleplay-Season 1, Episode 11 |
| 1992 | Law and Order | "Star Struck" | Teleplay - Season 2, Episode 12 |
| 1992 | Law and Order | "Blood Is Thicker..." | Story - Season 2, Episode 14 |
| 1992 | Law and Order | "Cradle to Grave" | Season 2, Episode 18 |
| 1992 | Law and Order | "Intolerance" | Story - Season 2, Episode 20 |
| 1992 | Law and Order | "Skin Deep" | Season 3, Episode 1 |
| 1992 | Law and Order | "Forgiveness" | Story - Season 3, Episode 3 |
| 1992 | Law and Order | "Wedded Bliss" | Season 3, Episode 5 |
| 1992 | Law and Order | "Prince of Darkness" | Season 3, Episode 8 |
| 1993 | Law and Order | "Extended Family" | Teleplay - Season 3, Episode 11 |
| 1993 | Law and Order | "Promises to Keep" | Teleplay - Season 3, Episode 14 |
| 1993 | Law and Order | "Mother Love" | Story/Teleplay - Season 3, Episode 15 |
| 1993 | Law and Order | "Manhood" | Story/Teleplay - Season 3, Episode 21 |
| 1993 | Law and Order | "Sweeps" | Season 4, Episode 1 |
| 1993 | Law and Order | "Pride and Joy" | Season 4, Episode 6 |
| 1993 | Law and Order | "The Pursuit of Happiness" | Season 4, Episode 10 |
| 1994 | Law and Order | "Kids" | Season 4, Episode 15 |
| 1994 | Law and Order | "Old Friends" | Story - Season 4, Episode 22 |
| 1994 | ER | "Into That Good Night" | Season 1, Episode 5 |
| 1994 | ER | "9 1/2 Hours" | Season 1, Episode 8 |
| 1995 | ER | "Long Day's Journey" | Season 1, Episode 14 |
| 1995 | ER | "Men Plan, God Laughs" | Season 1, Episode 22 |
| 1995 | The Client | "Them That Has..." | Season 1, Episode 2 |
| 1997 | Prince Street | "Pilot" | Season 1, Episode 1 |
| 1997 | Prince Street | "God Bless America" | Season 1, Episode 2 |
| 2003 | L.A. Dragnet | "The Brass Ring" | Season 1, Episode 6 |
| 2003 | L.A. Dragnet | "The Little Guy" | Season 1, Episode 12 |
| 2004 | Law & Order: Special Victims Unit | "Hate" | Season 5, Episode 13 |
| 2004 | Law & Order: Special Victims Unit | "Lowdown" | Season 5, Episode 20 |
| 2004 | Law & Order: Special Victims Unit | "Conscience" | Season 6, Episode 6 |
| 2005 | Law & Order: Special Victims Unit | "Strain" | Season 7, Episode 5 |
| 2006 | Conviction | "Deliverance" | Season 1, Episode 10 |
| 2006 | Law and Order | "Fear America" | Season 17, Episode 4 |
| 2008 | Dirt | "Ties That (Don't) Bind" | Season 2, Episode 4 |
| 2008 | Women's Murder Club | "Father's Day" | Story - Season 1, Episode 11 |
| 2008 | Women's Murder Club | "And the Truth Will (Sometimes) Set You Free " | Story - Season 1, Episode 12 |
| 2008 | Women's Murder Club | "Never Tell" | Story - Season 1, Episode 13 |
| 2009 | Law & Order: Criminal Intent | "The Glory That Was..." | Season 8, Episode 8 |
| 2012 | Fairly Legal | "Ripple of Hope" | Season 2, Episode 8 |
| 2014 | Taxi Brooklyn | "Double Identity" | Season 1, Episode 9 |

== Selected bibliography ==
- Amusement Park, The Dial Press, 1977.
- Rising Higher, The Dial Press, 1981.
- The White Tiger (1987, Simon and Schuster; ISBN 978-0-00-222978-4)
- The Bushido Code, Fawcett (writing as Robert St. Louis), 1981.
- The Religion, co-writing as Nicholas Condé (1982, New American Library; ISBN 0-451-12119-8)
- The Legend, co-writing as Nicholas Condé (1984, New American Library)
- In the Deep Woods, co-writing as Nicholas Condé (1989, St. Martin's Press; ISBN 9780312929909)
