= Palo (religion) =

Syncretic Afro-Cuban religion

Palo, also known as Las Reglas de Congo, is an African diasporic religion that developed in Cuba during the late 19th or early 20th century. It draws heavily upon the traditional Kongo religion of Central Africa, with additional influences taken from Catholicism and from Spiritism. An initiatory religion practised by paleros (male) and paleras (female), Palo is organised through small autonomous groups called munanso congo, each led by a tata (father) or yayi (mother).

Although teaching the existence of a creator divinity, commonly called Nsambi, Palo regards this entity as being uninvolved in human affairs and instead focuses its attention on the spirits of the dead. Central to Palo is the nganga, a vessel usually made from an iron cauldron. Many nganga are regarded as material manifestations of ancestral or nature deities known as mpungu. The nganga will typically contain a wide range of objects, among the most important being sticks and human remains, the latter called nfumbe. In Palo, the presence of the nfumbe means that the spirit of that dead person inhabits the nganga and serves the palero or palera who possesses it. The Palo practitioner commands the nganga to do their bidding, typically to heal but also to cause harm. Those nganga primarily designed for benevolent acts are baptised; those largely designed for malevolent acts are left unbaptised. The nganga is "fed" with the blood of sacrificed animals and other offerings, while its will and advice is interpreted through divination. Group rituals often involve singing, drumming, and dancing to facilitate possession by spirits of the dead.

Palo developed among Afro-Cuban communities following the Atlantic slave trade of the 16th to 19th centuries. It emerged largely from the traditional religions brought to Cuba by enslaved Bakongo people from Central Africa, but also incorporated ideas from Catholicism, the only religion legally permitted on the island by the Spanish colonial government. The minkisi, spirit-vessels that were key to various Bakongo healing societies, provided the basis for the nganga of Palo. The religion took its distinct form around the late 19th or early 20th century, about the same time that Yoruba religious traditions merged with Catholic and Spiritist ideas in Cuba to produce Santería. After the Cuban War of Independence resulted in an independent republic in 1898, the country's new constitution enshrined freedom of religion. Palo nevertheless remained marginalized by Cuba's Catholic, Euro-Cuban establishment, which typically viewed it as brujería (witchcraft), an identity that many Palo practitioners have since embraced. In the 1960s, growing emigration following the Cuban Revolution spread Palo abroad.

Palo is divided into multiple traditions or ramas, including Mayombe, Monte, Briyumba, and Kimbisa, each with their own approaches to the religion. Many practitioners also identify as Catholics and practice additional Afro-Cuban traditions such as Santería or Abakuá. Palo is most heavily practiced in eastern Cuba although it is found throughout the island and abroad, including in other parts of the Americas such as Venezuela, Mexico, and the United States. In many of these countries, Palo practitioners have faced problems with law enforcement for engaging in grave robbery to procure human bones for their nganga.

== Definitions ==
Palo is an Afro-Cuban religion, and more broadly an Afro-American religion. Its name derives from palo, a Spanish term for stick, referencing the important role that such items play in the religion's practices. Another term for the religion is La Regla de Congo ("Kongo Rule" or "Law of Kongo") or Regla Congo, a reference to its origins among the traditional Kongo religion of Central Africa's Bakongo people. Palo is also sometimes referred to as brujería (witchcraft), both by outsiders and by some practitioners themselves.

Although its beliefs and practices come principally from the Kongo religion, Palo also draws upon the traditional religions of other African peoples who were brought to Cuba, such as the West African Yoruba. These African elements combined with influences from Catholicism and also from Spiritism, a French variant of Spiritualism. Palo's African heritage is important to practitioners, who often refer to their religious homeland as Ngola; this indicates a belief in the historical Kingdom of Kongo as Palo's place of origin, a place where the spirits are more powerful.

There is no central authority in control of Palo, but separate groups of practitioners who operate autonomously. It is largely transmitted orally, and has no sacred text, nor any systematized doctrine. There is thus no overarching orthodoxy, and no strict ritual protocol, giving its practitioners scope for innovation and change. Different practitioners often interpret the religion differently, resulting in highly variable practices. Several distinct traditions or denominations of Palo exist, called ramas ("branches"), with the main ramas being Mayombe, Briyumba, Monte, and Kimbisa.

Practitioners are usually termed paleros if male, paleras if female, terms which can be translated as "one who handles tree branches". An alternative term for adherents is mayomberos. Another term applied to Palo practitioners in Cuba is ngangulero and ngangulera, meaning "a person who works a nganga", the latter being the spirit-vessel central to the religion. The term carries pejorative connotations in Cuban society although some practitioners adopt it as a term of pride. A similarly pejorative term embraced by some adherents is brujo (witch), with Palo being one of several African-derived religions in the Americas whose practitioners adopt the identity of the witch as a form of reappropriation.

=== Relationship to Afro-Cuban religions ===
Palo is one of three major Afro-Cuban religions present on Cuba, the other two being Santería, which derives largely from the Yoruba religion of West Africa, and Abakuá, which has its origins in the Ekpe society of West Africa's Efik-Ibibio peoples. Many Palo initiates are also involved in Santería, Abakuá, Spiritism, or Catholicism; some Palo practitioners believe that only baptised Catholics should be initiated into the tradition. Practitioners often see these various religions as offering complementary skills and mechanisms to solve people's issues, or alternatively as each being best suited to resolving different problems.

"Cruzar palo con ocha" ("cross Palo with Ocha") is a phrase used to indicate that an individual practises both Palo and Santería, ocha being one of the terms used for Santería's deities. Those following both will usually keep the rituals of the two traditions separate, with some Palo initiates objecting to the introduction of elements from Santería into their religion. If someone is to be initiated into both, generally they will be initiated into Palo first; some claim that this is because moving from Santería to Palo represents a spiritual regression, while others maintain that the oricha spirit placed within the adherent's body during Santería initiation would not tolerate the flesh-cutting process required for initiation into Palo.

Comparisons have also been drawn between Palo and other African-derived traditions in the Americas. Certain similarities in practice have for instance been identified between Palo and Haitian Vodou. Palo also has commonalities with Obeah, a practice found in Jamaica, and it is possible that Palo and Obeah cross-fertilised via Jamaican migration to Cuba from 1925 onward.

== Beliefs ==
=== Deities and spirits ===
Although Palo lacks a full mythology, its worldview includes a supreme creator divinity, Nsambi or Sambia. In the religion's mythology, Nsambi is believed responsible for creating the world and the first man and woman. This entity is regarded as being remote and inaccessible from humanity, and thus no prayers or sacrifices are directed towards it. The anthropologist Todd Ramón Ochoa, an initiate of Palo Briyumba, describes Nsambi as "the power in matter that pushes back against human manipulation and imposes itself against a person's will". In the context of Afro-Cuban religion, Nsambi has been compared to Olofi in Santería and Abasí in Abakuá.

In Palo, veneration is directed towards ancestors and spirits of the natural world, both of which are called mpungus. According to the anthropologist Katerina Kerestetzi, a mpungu represents "a sort of minor divinity". Each mpungu commonly has its own names and epithets, and may display multiple aspects or manifestations, each with their own specific names. Among the most prominent of these mpungu, at least in Havana, are Lucero, Sarabanda, Siete Rayos, Ma' Kalunga, Mama Chola, Centella Ndoki, and Tiembla Tierra. Others include Nsasi, Madre de Agua, Brazo Fuerte, Lufo Kuyo, Mama canata, Bután, and Baluandé. Each mpungu may have its own particular associations; Lucero for instance opens and closes paths while Sarabanda is seen as being strong and wild. The mpungus of nature are deemed to live in rivers and the sea, as well as in trees, with uncultivated areas of forest regarded as being especially potent locations of spiritual power. Practitioners are expected to make agreements with these nature spirits.

Particular mpungus are often equated with specific oricha spirits from Santería, as well as with saints from Catholicism. Sarabanda, for example, is associated with the oricha Oggun and with Saint Peter, while Lufo Kuyo is connected to the oricha Ochosi and to Saint Norbert. However, mpungus play a less important role in Palo than the oricha do in Santería. There is also a difference in how the relationship between these entities is established; in Santería it is believed that the oricha call people to their worship, pressuring them to do so by inflicting sickness or misfortune, whereas in Palo it is the human practitioner who desires and instigates the relationship with the spirit. In Cuba, Palo is often regarded as being cruder, wilder, and more violent than Santería, with its spirits being fierce and unruly. Those initiates who work with both the oricha and the Palo spirits are akin to those practitioners of Haitian Vodou who conduct rituals for both the Rada and Petwo branches of the lwa spirits; the oricha, like the Rada, are even-tempered, while the Palo spirits, like the Petwo, are more chaotic and unpredictable.

==== Spirits of the dead ====
The spirits of the dead play a prominent role in Palo, with Kerestetzi observing that one of Palo's central features is its belief that "the spirits of the dead mediate and organize human action and rituals." In Palo, the spirit of a dead person is referred to as a nfumbe (or nfumbi), a term deriving from the Kikongo word for a deceased individual, mvumbi. Alternative terms used for the dead in Palo include the Yoruba term eggun, or Spanish words like el muerto ("the dead") or, more rarely, espíritu ("spirit"). Practitioners will sometimes refer to themselves, as living persons, as the "walking dead". In Palo, the dead are often viewed as what Ochoa called "a dense and indistinguishable mass" rather than as discrete individuals, and in this collective sense they are often termed Kalunga.

Palo teaches that the individual comprises both a physical body and a spirit termed the sombra ("shade"), which are connected via a cordón de plata ("silver cord"). This conception reflects a combination of the Bakongo notion of the spirit "shadow" with the Spiritist notion of the perisperm, a spirit-vapor surrounding the human body. Once a person dies they are thought to gain additional powers and knowledge such as prescience. They can contact and assist the living, but also cause them problems such as anxiety and sleeplessness.

Paleros/paleras venerate the souls of their ancestors; when a group feast is held, the ancestors of the house will typically be invoked and their approval to proceed requested. To ascertain the consent of the dead, Palo's practitioners will often employ divination or forms of spirit mediumship from Spiritism. Some practitioners claim an innate capacity to sense the presence of spirits of the dead, and initiates are often expected to interact with these spirits and to try and influence them for their own personal benefit. In communicating with the dead, paleros and paleras are sometimes termed muerteros ("mediums of the dead").

The dead are also believed capable of existing within physical matter. They can for instance be represented by small assemblages of material, often discarded or everyday household objects, which are placed together, typically in the corner of the patio or an outhouse. They are often called a rinconcito ("little corner"). Offerings of food and drink are often placed at the rinconcito and allowed to decay. This is a practice also maintained by many followers of Santería, although this emphasis placed on the material presence of the dead differs from the Spiritist views of deceased spirits.

=== The Nganga ===
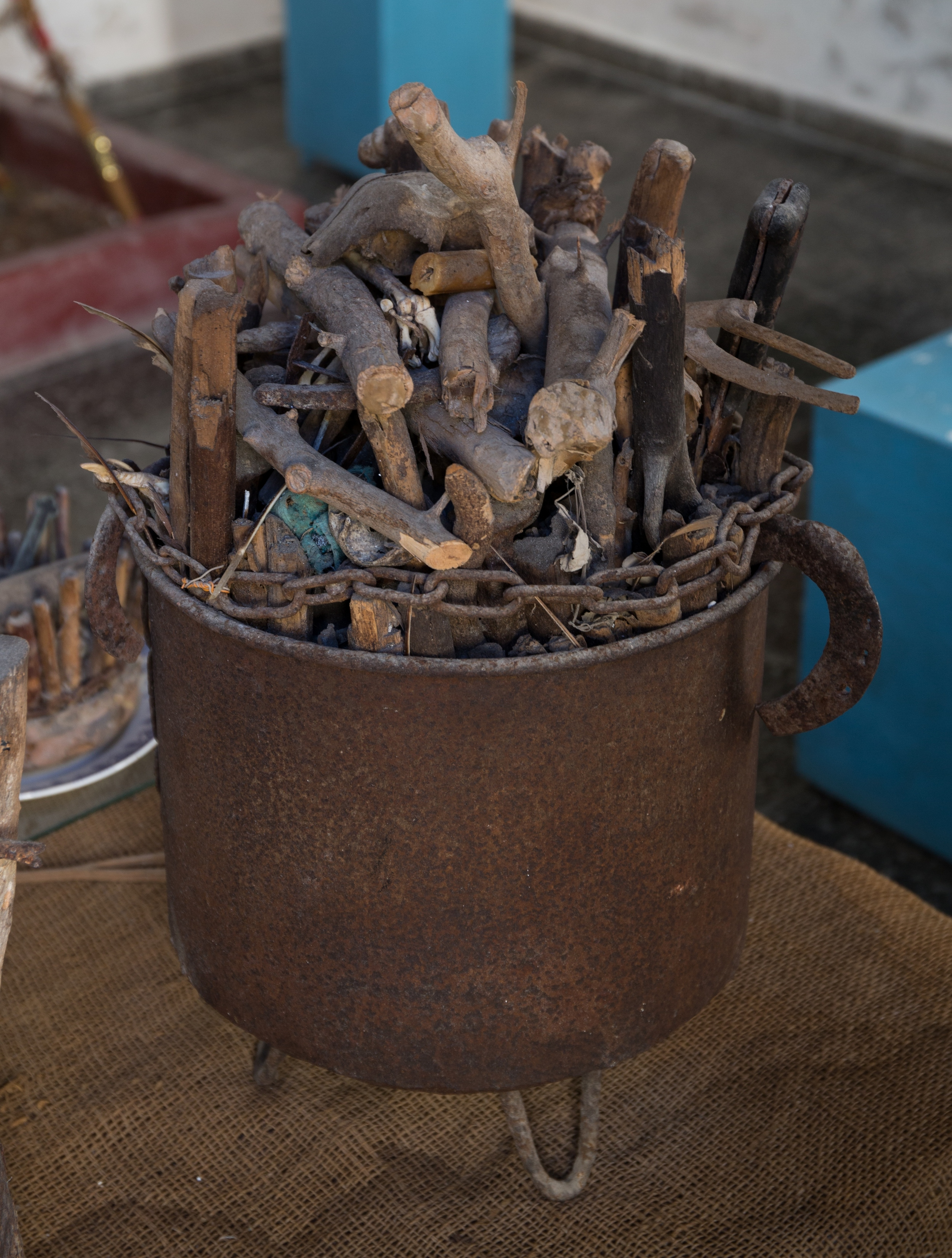
A replica of a Palo nganga on display in a Cuban museum

A key role in Palo is played by a spirit-vessel called the nganga, a term which in Central Africa referred not to an object but to a man who oversaw religious rituals. This spirit-vessel is also commonly known as the prenda, a Spanish term meaning "treasure" or "jewel". Alternative terms that are sometimes used for it are el brujo (the sorcerer), the caldero (cauldron), or the cazuela (pot), while a small, portable version is termed the nkuto. On rare occasions, a practitioner may also refer to the nganga as a nkisi (plural minkisi). The minkisi are Bakongo ritual objects believed to possess an indwelling spirit and are the basis of the Palo nganga tradition, the latter being a "uniquely Cuban" development.

The nganga comprises either a clay pot, gourd, or an iron pot or cauldron. This is often wrapped tightly in heavy chains. Every nganga is physically unique, bearing its own individual name; some are deemed male, others female. It is custom that the nganga should not stand directly on either a wooden or tile base, and for that reason the area beneath it is often packed with bricks and earth. The nganga is kept in a domestic sanctum, the munanso, or cuarto de fundamento. This may be a cupboard, a room in a practitioner's house, or a structure in their backyard. This may be decorated in a way that alludes to the forest, for instance with the remains of animal species that live in forest areas, as the latter are deemed abodes of the spirits. When an individual practices both Palo and Santería, they typically keep the spirit-vessels of the respective traditions separate, in different rooms.

Terms like nganga and prenda designate not only the physical vessel but also the spirit believed to inhabit it. For many practitioners, the nganga is regarded as a material manifestation of a mpungu deity. Different mpungu will lend different traits to the nganga; Sarabanda for instance imbues it with his warrior skills. The mpungu involved may dictate the choice of vessel used for the nganga, as well as the stone placed in it and the symbol, the firma, which is drawn onto it. The name of the nganga may refer to the indwelling mpungu; an example would be a nganga called the "Sarabanda Noche Oscura" because it contains the mpungu Sarabanda. The nganga is deemed to be alive; Ochoa commented that, in the view of Palo's followers, the ngangas are not static objects, but "agents, entities, or actors" with an active role in society. They are believed to express their will to Palo's practitioners both through divination and through spirit possession.

Palo revolves around service and submission to the nganga. Kerestetzi observed that in Palo, "the nganga is not an intermediary of the divine, it is the divine itself [...] It is a god in its own right." Those who keep ngangas are termed the perros (dogs) or criados (servants) of the spirit-vessel, which in turn is deemed to protect them. The relationship that a Palo practitioner develops with their nganga is supposed to be lifelong, and a common notion is that the keeper becomes like their nganga. A practitioner may receive their own nganga only once they have reached a certain level of seniority in the tradition, and the highest-ranking members may have multiple ngangas, some of which they have inherited from their own teachers. Some practitioners will consult a nganga to help them make decisions in life, deeming it omniscient. The nganga desires its keeper's attention; initiates believe that they often become jealous and possessive of their keepers. Ochoa characterised the relationship between the palero/palera and their nganga as a "struggle of wills", with the Palo practitioner looking upon the nganga with "respect based on fear".

The nganga is regarded as the source of a palero or palera's supernatural power. Within the religion's beliefs, it can both heal and harm, and in the latter capacity is thought capable of causing misfortune, illness, and death. Practitioners believe that the better a nganga is cared for, the stronger it is and the better it can protect its keeper, but at the same time the more it is thought capable of dominating its keeper, potentially even killing them. Various stories circulating the Palo community tell of practitioners driven to disastrous accidents, madness, or destitution. Tales of a particular nganga's rebelliousness and stubbornness contribute to the prestige of its keeper, as it indicates that their nganga is powerful.

==== Fundamentos ====
The contents of the nganga are termed the fundamentos, and are believed to contribute to its power. Sticks, called palos, are key ingredients; palos are selected from certain species of tree. The choice of tree selected indicates the branch of Palo involved, with the sticks believed to embody the properties and powers of the trees from which they came. Soil may be added from various locations, for instance from a graveyard, hospital, prison, and a market, as may water taken from a river, a well, and the sea. A matari stone, representing the specific mpungu linked to that nganga, may be incorporated. Other material added can include animal remains, feathers, shells, plants, gemstones, coins, razorblades, knives, padlocks, horseshoes, railway spikes, blood, wax, aguardiente liquor, wine, quicksilver, and spices. Objects that are precious to the owner, or which have been obtained from far away, may be added, and the harder that these objects are to obtain, the more significant they are often considered to be. This varied selection of material can result in the nganga being characterised as a microcosm of the world.

The precise form of the nganga, such as its size, can reflect the customs of the different Palo traditions. Ngangas in the Briyumba tradition are for instance characterised by a ring of sticks extending beyond their rim. Objects may also be selected for their connection with the indwelling mpungu. A nganga of Sarabanda for instance may feature many metal objects, reflecting his association with metals and war. As more objects are added over time, typically as offerings, the quantity of material will often spill out from the vessel itself and be arranged around it, sometimes taking up a whole room. The mix of items produces a strong, putrid odour and attracts insects, with Ochoa describing the ngangas as being "viscerally intimidating to confront".

==== The Nfumbe ====
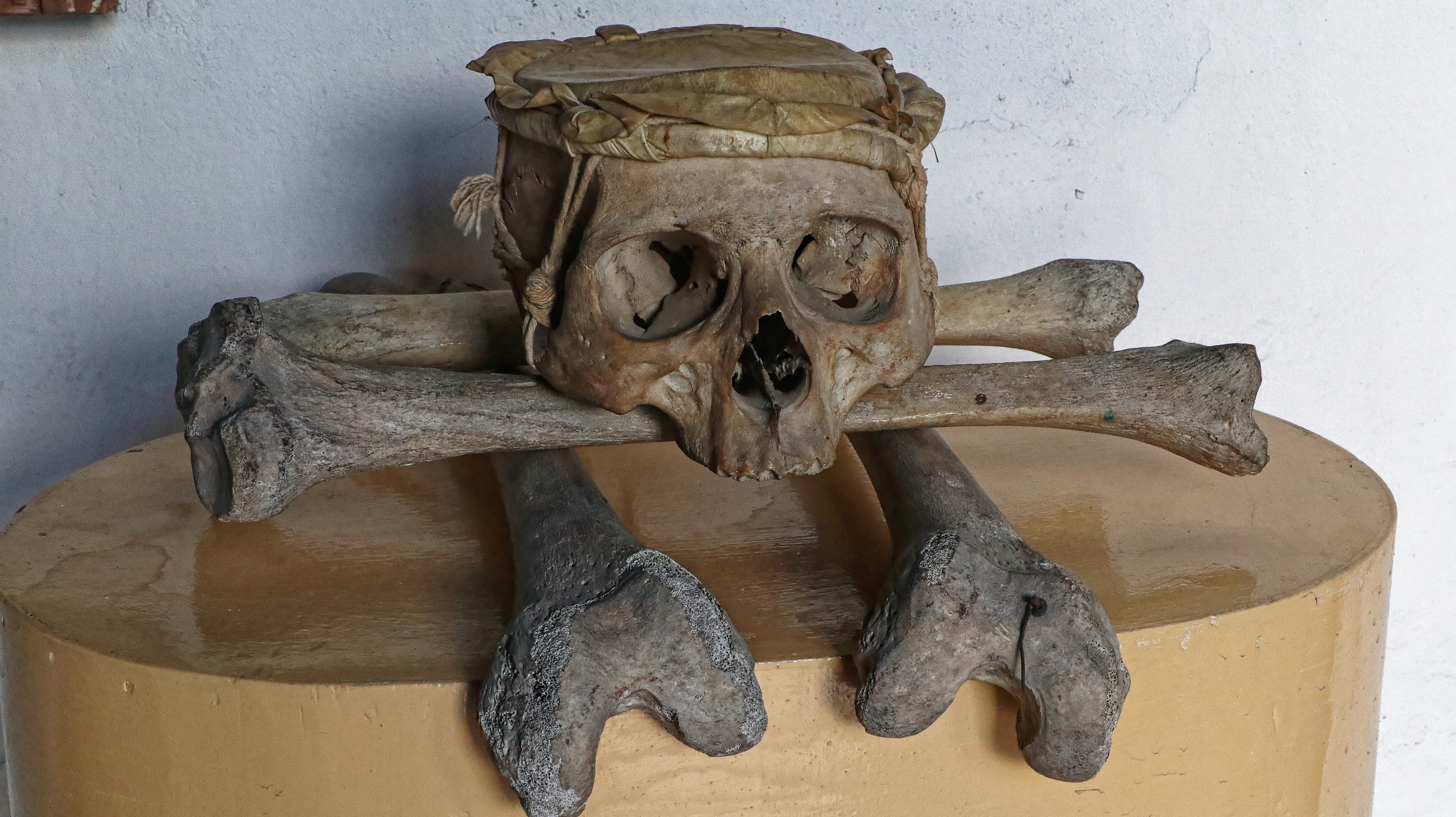
A human skull and bones displayed in the Museo de Orishas in Havana. Human remains are included in the nganga of Palo.

Human bones are also typically included in the nganga. Some traditions, like Briyumba, consider this an essential component of the spirit-vessel; other initiates feel that soil or a piece of clothing from a grave may suffice. Practitioners will often claim that their nganga contains human remains even if it does not. The most important body part for this purpose is the skull, called the kiyumba. The human bones are termed the nfumbe, a Palo Kikongo word meaning "dead one"; it characterises both the bones themselves and the dead person they belonged to.

Bones are selected judiciously; the sex of the nfumbe is typically chosen to match the gender of the nganga it is being incorporated into. According to Palo tradition, an initiate should exhume the bones from a graveyard themselves, although in urban areas this is often impractical and practitioners instead obtain them through black market agreements with the groundskeepers and administrators responsible for maintaining cemeteries. Elsewhere, they may purchase humans remains through botánicas or obtain anatomical teaching specimens.

By tradition, a Palo practitioner travels to a graveyard at night. There, they focus on a specific grave and seek to communicate with the spirit of the person buried there, typically through divination. Following negotiations, they create a trata (pact) with the spirit, whereby the latter agrees to serve the practitioner in exchange for promises of offerings. Once they believe that they have the spirit's consent, the palero/palera will dig up their bones, or at least collect soil from their grave, and take it home. After being removed from their grave, the bones of the nfumbe may undergo attempts to "cool" and settle them, being aspirated with white wine and aguardiente and fumigated with cigar smoke. Placing the bones in the spirit-vessel is perceived as sealing the pact between the practitioner and the nfumbe. A paper note on which the nfumbe's name is written may also be added.

Palo teaches that the nfumbe spirit then resides in the nganga. This becomes the owner's slave, making the relationship between the palero/palera and their nfumbe quite different from the reciprocal relationship that the santero/santera has with their oricha in Santería. The keeper of the nganga promises to feed the nfumbe, for instance with animal blood, rum, and cigars. In turn, the nfumbe offers services called trabajos, protects its keeper, and carries out their commands. Practitioners will sometimes talk of their nfumbe having a distinct personality, displaying traits such as stubbornness or jealousy. The nfumbe will rule over other spirits in the nganga, including those of plants and animals. Specific animal parts added are believed to enhance the skills of the nfumbe in the nganga; a bat's skeleton for instance might give the nfumbe the ability to fly at night, a turtle would give it a ferocious bite, and a dog's head would give it a powerful sense of smell.

==== Ngangas cristianas and judías ====
The nganga generally divide into two categories, the cristiana (Christian) and the judía (Jewish). The terms cristiana and judía in this context reflect the influence of 19th-century Spanish Catholic ideas about good and evil, with the word judía connoting something being non-Christian rather than being specifically associated with Judaism. Ngangas cristianas are deemed "baptised" because holy water from a Catholic church is included as one of their ingredients; they may also include a crucifix. The human remains included in them are also expected to be that of a Christian. While ngangas cristianas can be used to counter-strike against attackers, they are prohibited from killing. Conversely, ngangas judías are used for trabajos malignos, or harmful work, and are capable of murder. Human remains included in ngangas judías are typically those of a non-Christian, although not necessarily of a Jew. Sometimes, the bones of a criminal or mad person are deliberately sought. Those observing Palo during the 1990s, including Ochoa and the medical anthropologist Johann Wedel, noted that ngangas judías were then rare.

Many practitioners maintain that the two types of nganga should be kept separate to stop them fighting. Unlike ngangas cristianas, which only receive their keeper's blood at the latter's initiation, ngangas judías are fed their keeper's blood more often; they are feared capable of betraying their keeper to drain more of their blood. Palo teaches that although ngangas judías are more powerful, they are less effective. This is because ngangas judías are scared of the ngangas cristianas and thus vulnerable to them on every day of the year except Good Friday. In Christianity, Good Friday marks the day on which Jesus Christ was crucified, and thus paleros and paleras believe that the powers of ngangas cristianas are temporarily nullified, allowing the ngangas judías to be used. On Good Friday, a white sheet will often be placed over ngangas cristianas to keep them "cool" and protect them during this vulnerable period.

==== Creating a nganga ====
The nganga does not merely transcend different ontological categories, it also blurs common oppositions, for example between living and dead, material and immaterial, sacred and profane. It is a living being but its main component is a dead man; it overflows with materiality but its body represents an invisible being; its word is infallible but its personality is drawn from the history of an ordinary person.

— Anthropologist Katerina Kerestetzi

The making of a nganga is a complex procedure. It can take several days, with its components occurring at specific times during the day and month. The process of creating a new nganga is often kept secret, amid concerns that if a rival Palo practitioner learns the exact ingredients of the particular nganga, it will leave the latter vulnerable to supernatural attacks.

When a new nganga is created for a practitioner, it is said to nacer ("spring forth" or "be born") from the "mother" nganga which rules the house. Elements may be removed from this parent nganga for incorporation into the new creation. The first nganga of a tradition, from which all others ultimately stem, is called the tronco ("trunk"). The senior practitioner creating the nganga may ask a high-ranking initiate to assist them, something considered a great privilege.

The new cauldron or vessel will be washed in agua ngongoro, a mix of water and various herbs; the purpose of this is to "cool" the vessel, for the dead are considered "hot". After this, markings known as firmas may be drawn onto the new vessel. During the process of constructing the nganga, an experienced Palo practitioner will divine to ensure that everything is going well. Corn husk packets called masangó may be added to establish the capacities of that nganga. The creator may also add some of their own blood, providing the new nganga with an infusion of vital force. Within a day of its creation, Palo custom holds that it must be fed with animal blood. Some practitioners will then bury the nganga, either in a cemetery or natural area, before recovering it for use in their rituals.

==== Maintaining a nganga ====
[The nganga] mediates and concretizes a mystical relationship between the spirit and its human counterpart, a relationship often described as a pact or bargain entered into (pacto, trata) and surrounded not by images of domestic nurturance, reciprocal exchange, and beneficial dependence, but by symbols of wage labor and payment, dominance and subalternity, enslavement and revolt.

— Historian Stefan Palmié

The nganga is "fed" with blood from sacrificed male animals, including dogs, pigs, goats, and cockerels. This blood is poured into the nganga, over time blackening it. Practitioners believe that the blood maintains the nganga's power and vitality and ensures ongoing reciprocity with its keeper.

Human blood is typically only given to the nganga when the latter is created, so as to animate it, and later when a neophyte is being initiated, to help seal the pact between them. It is feared that a nganga that develops a taste for human blood will continually demand it, ultimately killing its keeper. As well as blood, the nganga will be offered food and tobacco, fumigated with cigar smoke and aspirated with cane liquor, often sprayed onto it by mouth.

Initiates follow a specific etiquette when engaging with the nganga. They typically wear white, go barefoot, and draw marks on their body to keep them "cool" and protect from the tumult of the dead. Practitioners kneel before the ngangas in greeting; they may greet them with the Arabic-derived phrase "Salaam alaakem, malkem salaam." The nganga likes to be addressed in song and each nganga has particular songs that "belong" to it. Candles will often be burned while the keeper seeks to work with the vessel. A glass of water may be placed nearby, intended to "cool" the presence of the dead, and to assist their crossing to the human world. Objects like necklaces, small packages, and dolls may be placed around the nganga so as to be vitalized with power, allowing them to be used in other rites. To ensure that a nganga does its keeper's bidding, the latter sometimes threatens it, sometimes insulting it or hitting it with a broom or whip.

When a practitioner dies, their nganga may be disassembled if it is believed that the inhabiting nfumbi refuses to serve anyone else and wishes to be set free. The nganga may then be buried beneath a tree, placed into a river or the sea, or buried with the deceased initiate. Alternatively, Palo teaches that the nganga may desire a new keeper, thus being inherited by another practitioner.

=== Morality, ethics, and gender roles ===
Palo teaches deference to teachers, elders, and the dead. According to Ochoa, the religion maintains that "speed, strength, and clever decisiveness" are positive traits for practitioners, while also exulting the values of "revolt, risk and change". The religion has not adopted the Christian notion of sin, and does not present a particular model of ethical perfection for its practitioners to strive towards. The focus of the practice is thus not perfection, but power. It has been characterised as a world-embracing religion, rather than a world-renouncing one.

Both men and women are allowed to practice Palo. While women can hold the religion's most senior positions, most praise houses in Havana are run by men, and an attitude of machismo is common among Palo groups. Ochoa thought that Palo could be described as patriarchal, and the scholar of religion Mary Ann Clark encountered many women who deemed the community of practitioners to be too masculinist. Many Palo initiates maintain that women should not be given a nganga while they are still capable of menstruating; the religion teaches that a menstruating woman's presence would weaken the nganga and that the nganga's thirst for blood would cause the woman to bleed excessively, potentially killing her. For this reason, many female practitioners only receive a nganga once they are past the age of menopause, decades after their male contemporaries. Gay men are often excluded from Palo, and observers have reported high levels of homophobia within the tradition, in contrast to the large numbers of gay men involved in Santería.

== Practices ==
Palo is an initiatory religion. Rather than being practised openly, its practices are typically secretive, but revolve around the nganga, which is central to its ceremonies, trabajos ("works"), and divination. The language used in Palo ceremonies, as in its songs, is often called Palo Kikongo; a "Creole speech" based on both Kikongo and Spanish, it Hispanicizes the spelling of many Kikongo words and gives them new meanings. Practitioners greet one another with the phrase nsala malekum. They also acknowledge each other with a special handshake in which their right thumbs are locked together and the palms meet.

=== Praise houses ===
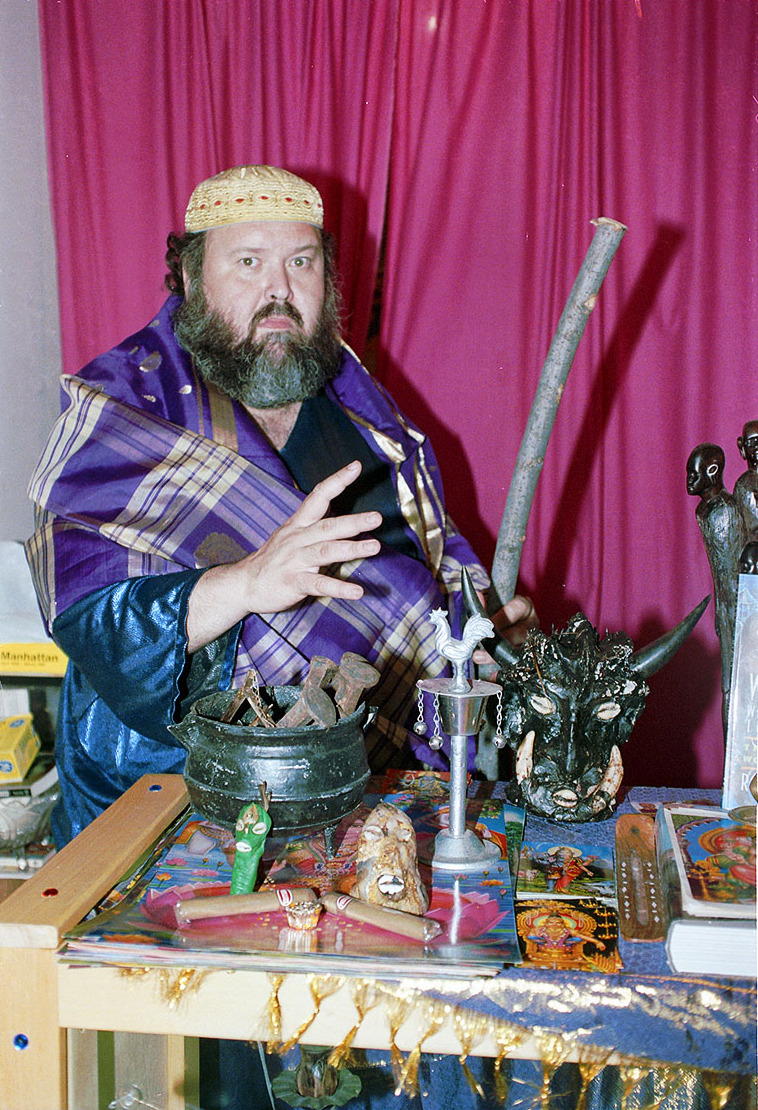
Baba Raúl Cañizares, a Cuban priest of both Santería and Palo; here he is photographed with his ritual paraphernalia, including a nganga cauldron.

Palo is organized around autonomous initiatory groups. Each of these groups is called a munanso congo ("Kongo House"), or sometimes a casa templo ("temple house"). Ochoa rendered this as "praise house". Their gatherings for ceremonies are supposed to be kept secret. Practitioners sometimes seek to protect the praise house by placing small packets, termed makutos (sing. nkuto), at each corner of the block around the building; these packets contain dirt from four corners and material from the nganga.

Munanso congo form familias de religión ("religious families"). Each is led by a man or woman regarded as a symbolic parent of their initiates; this senior palero is called a tata nganga ("father nganga"), while the senior palera is a yayi nganga ("mother nganga"). This person must have their own nganga and the requisite knowledge of ritual to lead others. This figure is referred to as the padrino ("godfather") or madrina ("godmother") of their initiates; their pupil is the ahijado ("godchild").

A person's rank within the house depends on the length of their involvement and the depth of their knowledge about Palo. Below the tata and yayi are initiates of long-standing, referred to as a padre nganga if male and a madre nganga if female. The initiation of people to this level is rare. At their initiation ceremony to the level of padre or madre, a palero/palera will often be given their own nganga. The tata or yayi may choose not to tell the padre/madre the contents of the new nganga or instructions regarding how to use it, thus ensuring that the teacher maintains control in their relationship with the student.

A tata or yayi may be reluctant to teach their padres and madres too much about Palo, fearing that if they do so the student will break from their praise house to establish their own. A padre or madre will not have initiates of their own. A particular padre (but not a madre) might be selected as a special assistant of the tata or yayi; if they serve the former then they are called a bakofula, if they serve the latter they are a mayordomo ("butler", "steward"). The madrinas and padrinos are often considered possessive of their student initiates. Experienced practitioners who run their own praise houses often vie with one another for prospective initiates and will sometimes try to steal members from each other.

An individual seeking initiation into a praise house is usually someone who has previously consulted a palero or palera to request their aid, for instance in the area of health, love, property, or money, or in the fear that they have been bewitched. The Palo practitioner may suggest that the client's misfortunes result from their bad relationship with the spirits of the dead, and that this can be improved by receiving initiation into Palo. New initiates are called ngueyos, a term meaning "child" in the Palo Kikongo language. In the Briyumba and Monte traditions, new initiates are also known as pinos nuevos ("saplings"). Ngueyos may attend feasts for the praise house's nganga, to which they are expected to contribute, and may seek advice from it, but they will not receive their own personal nganga nor attend initiation ceremonies for the higher grades. Many practitioners are content to remain at this level and do not pursue further initiation to reach the status of padre or madre.

When the tata or yayi of a house is close to death, they are expected to announce a successor, who will then be ritually accepted as the new tata or yayi by the house members. The new leader may adopt the nganga of their predecessor, resulting in them having multiple nganga to care for. Alternatively, at a leader's death, the senior initiates of the house may leave to join another or establish their own. This results in some Palo practitioners being members of multiple familias de religion.

=== Firmas ===
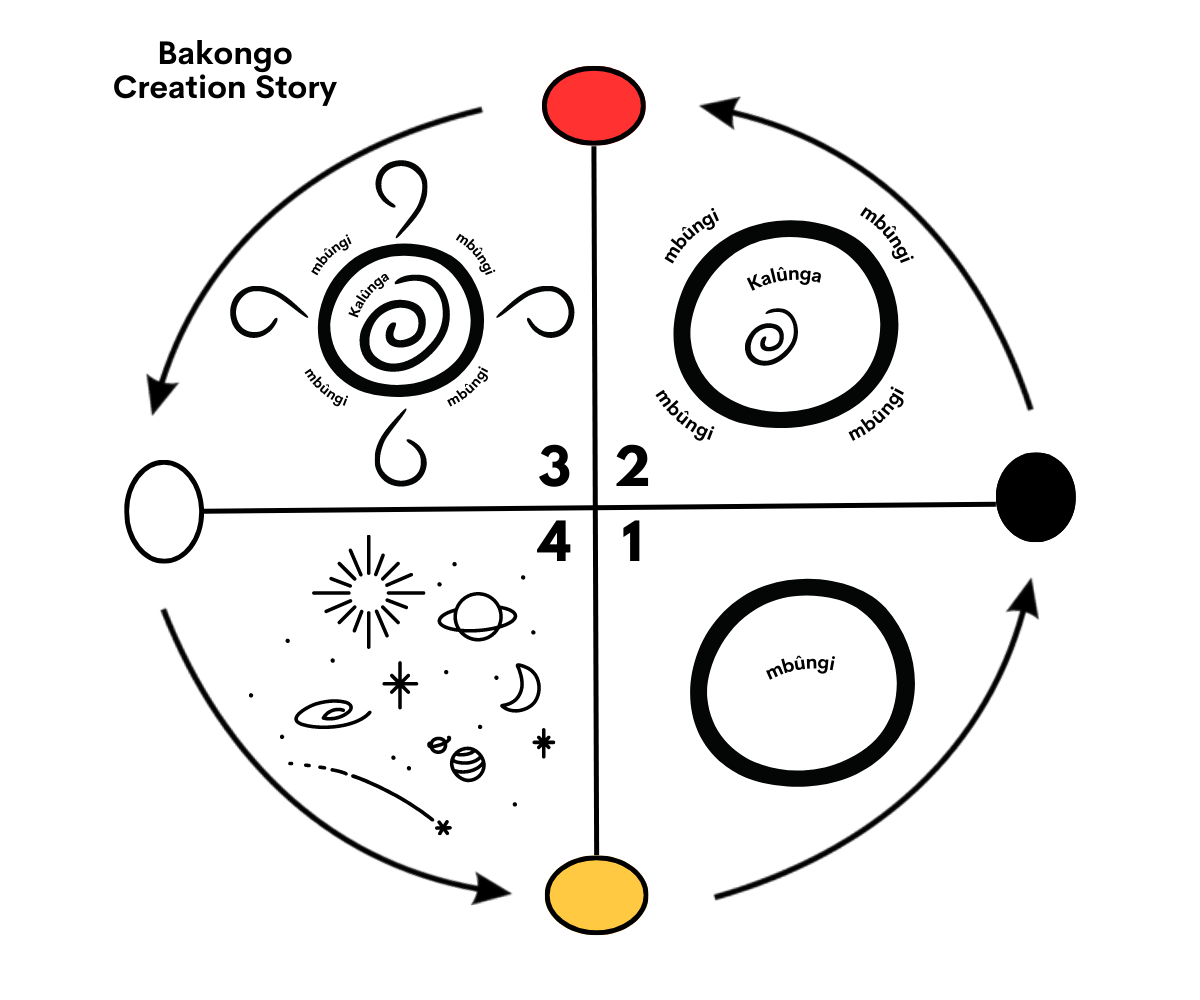
The Bakongo cosmograms are a likely influence on the firmas of Palo.

Drawings called firmas, their name taken from the Spanish for "signature", play an important role in Palo ritual. They are alternatively referred to as tratados ("pacts" or "deals"). The firmas often incorporate lines, arrows, circles, and crosses, as well as skulls, suns, and moons. They allow the mpungu to enter the ceremonial space, with a sign corresponding to the mpungu that is being invoked drawn at any given ceremony.

As they facilitate contact between the worlds, the firmas are deemed to be caminos ("roads"). They also help to establish the will of the living over the dead, directing the action of both the human and spirit participants in a ritual. The firmas are akin to the vèvè employed in Haitian Vodou and the anaforuanas used by Abakuá members.

Firmas may derive from the sigils employed in European ceremonial magic traditions. However, some of the designs commonly found in firmas, such as that of the sun circling the Earth and of a horizon line dividing the worlds, are probably borrowed from traditional Kongo cosmology. There are many different designs; some are specific to the mpungu it invokes, others to a particular munanso congo or to an individual practitioner. As they are deemed very powerful, knowledge of the firmas' meanings are often kept secret, even from new initiates. Some practitioners have a notebook in which they have drawn the firmas that they use, and from which they may teach others.

Before a ceremony, the firmas are drawn around the room, including on the floor, on the walls, and on ritual objects. They are often placed at locations suggesting a direction of movement, such as a window or a door. They may also be drawn on handkerchiefs worn by participants on their head or chest. The creation of these drawings is accompanied by chants called mambos. Gunpowder piles at specific points of the firma may then be lit, with the explosion deemed to attract the mpungu. Firmas are also cut into the bodies of new initiates, and drawn onto the nganga as it is being created.

=== Offerings and animal sacrifice ===
While offerings to the nganga are often given privately, it is also expected that the nganga receives sacrifices on its cumplimiento ("birthday"), the anniversary of its creation. Sacrifices will similarly often be given on the feast day of the Catholic saint thought to have most in common with the mpungu manifested in the nganga in question. The mpungu spirit Sarabanda is for instance feasted on June 29, the feast day of Saint Peter (San Pedro), who in Cuban tradition is associated with Sarabanda.

Among the offerings given to the nganga are food, aguardiente, cigars, candles, flowers, money, but especially blood, which the nganga feeds on to grow and gain power. Animal sacrifice is thus a key part of Palo ritual, where it is known by the Spanish language term matanza ("slaughter"). The choice of animal to be sacrificed depends on the reason for the offerings. Typically a rooster or two will be killed, but for more important issues a four-legged animal will usually be chosen. The head of the munanso congo is typically responsible for determining what sacrifice is appropriate for the situation. Animal blood is deemed very "hot", although the levels of heat depend on the species in question; human blood is thought "hottest", followed by that of turtles, sheep, ducks, and goats, while the blood of other birds, such as chickens and pigeons, is "cooler". Animals deemed to have "hotter" blood are usually killed first.

Where the killing is to take place, a firma will be drawn on the floor. There will often be singing, chanting, and sometimes drumming while the sacrificial animal is brought before the nganga; the animal's feet may be washed and it is given water to drink. The animal's throat will then typically be cut, usually by a senior figure in the munanso congo. The blood may be spilled over the ngangas and onto the floor. The animal will be butchered, its severed head often placed upon the nganga. Several organs will be removed, sautéed, and placed before the nganga, where they will often be left to decompose, producing a strong odor and attracting maggots. Other body parts will be prepared for the consumption of the attendees; attempts are often made to ensure that everyone attending the ritual consumes some of the sacrificed flesh. The sacrifice will often be followed by more generalized celebration involving singing, drumming, and dancing.

=== Music, dancing, and possession ===
Music is an important part of Palo ceremonies, with practitioners putting on performances for the nganga that involve singing, drumming and dancing. These will be performed at initiations, feast days, or on occasions when the nganga is being asked to do something. The songs employed are typically simpler than those found in Santería, consisting of repeating short melodies. The lyrics often invoke supernatural entities or are focused on making a talisman work. The songs are also antiphonal, with the soloist and chorus alternating, as is common in various African diasporic traditions.

The main style of drum used in Palo is the three-headed tumbadoras; this is distinct from the batá drum used in Santería. These drums are often played in groups of three. As tumbadoras are not always available, Palo's adherents sometimes use plywood boxes as drums. Various styles of drumming have been transmitted within Palo, including the ritmas congos ("Congo rhythms") and influencias bantu ("Bantu influences"). Each rama or Palo tradition also has its own ritual drumming style; the drumming rhythms favored in Mayombe and Briyumba are faster than those in Monte or Kimbisa. While performing, the drummers may vie against one another to display their skills.

The anthropologist Miguel Barnet observed a "striking element of pantomime" in Palo dances, during which dancers will often work themselves into an "absolute frenzy". A typical dance style used in Palo involves the dancer being slightly bent at the waist, swinging their arms and kicking their legs back at the knee. Another Palo dance style is the garabato, in which dancers wield sticks, usually taken from a guava tree, and bang them against each other. Unlike in Santería, dancers at Palo ceremonies do not proceed in a fixed line during the dance.

In Palo, it is believed that during the dancing, one of the dancers may be possessed by the dead. This individual will be known as the perro de prenda (possessed dog); they may drop to the floor at the start of the possession, reflecting a belief that the possessing spirit has come up from the ground. Practitioners believe that the spirit will control the body of the host for a time, during which the possessed person will adopt the traits of this entity. The possessed individual will often give advice, reveal secrets, predict the future, and cleanse attendees of negative influences.

=== Initiation and rites of passage ===
The initiation ceremony into a Palo praise house is known as a rayamiento ("cutting"). The ceremony is usually timed to occur on the night of a waxing moon, performed when the moon reaches its fullest light, due to a belief that the moon's potential grows in tandem with that of the dead. It will take place in el cuarto de religión ("the room of religion"), sometimes simply known as el cuarto ("the room"). The rayamiento ceremony involves an animal sacrifice; two cockerels are required, although sometimes additional animals will be killed to feed the nganga.

Prior to the initiatory ritual, the initiate will be washed in agua ngongoro, water mixed with various herbs, in a procedure called the limpieza; this is done to "cool" them. The initiate will then be brought into the ritual space blindfolded and wearing white; trousers may be rolled up to the knees, a towel over the shoulders, and a bandana on the head. The torso and feet are left unclothed. They may be guided to stand atop a firma drawn on the floor. They make promises to commit to the nganga of the praise house, bringing it offerings at its birthday feasts in return for its protection.

The initiate will then be cut; instruments used have included a razor blade, rooster's spur, or yúa thorn. Cuttings may be made on the chest, shoulders, back, hands, legs, or tongue. Some of the cuts will be straight lines, others may be crosses or more elaborate designs, forming firmas. The cuts are believed to open the initiate up to the spirits of the dead, thus enabling possession. A common belief in Palo is that the dead may possess the initiate at the moment of cutting, and thus it is not thought uncommon if they faint during it. The blood produced is then collected and given to the nganga, something practitioners believe enhances the cauldron's power to either heal or harm the initiate. Strands of the initiate's hair may also be placed in the nganga. Parts of the contents of the nganga may be rubbed into the initiate's wounds, sometimes including bone dust scraped from the nfumbe. These wounds will then be packed with candle wax and chamba, the latter a mix of powdered human bone, rum, chili, and garlic. The cuts sometimes leave scars.

Once the cutting has been done, the blindfold will be removed. The new initiate will then head outside to greet the moon before visiting a nearby cemetery. The suffering endured during the initiation rite is regarded as a test to determine if the neophyte has the qualities required of a palero or palera. New initiates must then learn the correct manner in which to approach the nganga and how to perform a sacrifice to it. Students are instructed in Palo through stories, songs, and the recollections of elders; they will also watch their elders and seek to decipher their riddles.

A practitioner may later experience a second rayamiento, enabling them to become a full-ranking initiate of the praise house, a padre or madre, and thus create their own nganga. At an initiate's funeral, a rooster may be sacrificed and its blood poured onto the coffin containing the deceased, thus completing the identification of the dead practitioner with the spirits of the dead. As at the initiation, a firma will often be painted onto the body.

=== Divination ===
Palo's practitioners communicate with their spirits via divination. The style of divination employed is determined by the nature of the question that the palero or palera wants answered. Two of the divinatory styles employed are the ndungui, which entails divining with pieces of coconut shell, and the chamalongos, which uses mollusc shells. Both of these divinatory styles are also employed, albeit with different names, by Santería's followers.

Fula is a form of divination using gunpowder. It entails small piles of gunpowder being placed over a board or on the floor. A question is asked and then one of the piles is set alight. If all the piles explode simultaneously, that is taken as an affirmative answer to the question. Another form of divination used in Palo is vititi mensu. This involves a small mirror placed at the opening of an animal horn decorated with beadwork, the mpaka. The mirror is then covered with smoke soot and the palero or palera interprets meanings from the shapes formed by the soot. The mpaka is sometimes called the "eyes of the nganga" and is often kept atop the nganga itself. Both fula and vititi mensu are forms of divination that Palo does not share with Santería.

=== Healing and hexing ===
Palo's practitioners often claim their rituals will immediately remedy a problem, and thus clients regularly approach a palero or palera when they want a rapid solution to an issue. The nature of the issue varies; it can involve dealing with state bureaucracy or emigration issues, relationship problems, or because they fear that they are plagued by a harmful spirit. On occasion, a client may request that the Palo initiate kill someone for them using their nganga. The fee paid to a Palo practitioner for their services is called a derecho. Ochoa noted that "common wisdom" in Cuba held that the fees charged by Palo initiates were less than those charged by Santería practitioners. Indeed, in many cases clients approach Palo practitioners for aid after having already sought help, unsuccessfully, from a Santería initiate.

Practitioners engage in healing through the use of charms, formulas, and spells, often drawing on an advanced knowledge of Cuba's plants and herbs. The first steps that a palero or palera will take to assist someone may be a limpieza or despojo ("clearing") in which the harmful dead are brushed off from an afflicted person. The limpieza will involve a combination of herbs bundled together that are wiped over the body and then burned or buried. Practitioners believe that the effect of these herbs is to "cool" the person to counter the turbulent "heat" of the dead that are around them. The limpieza is also employed in Santería.

Another healing procedure involves creating resguardos, charms that may incorporate tiny pieces of nfumbe, shavings from the palo sticks, earth from a grave and anthill, kimbansa grass, and animal body parts. These will typically be tied into little bundles and inserted into corn husks before being sewn into cloth packets that can be carried by the afflicted person. Songs will often be sung while creating the resguardo, while blood will be offered to vitalise it. The resguardo may be placed by the nganga for a time to absorb its influence. A Palo practitioner may also turn to the cambio de vida, or life switch, whereby the illness of the terminal patient is transmitted to another, usually a non-human animal but sometimes a doll or a human being, thus saving the client.

A concoction or package made for a client may be called a tratado ("treaty") and contain many of the same elements that go into a nganga. These packages are deemed to gain their power both from the material included within them and the prayers and songs that were performed while they were being created. This may be placed on the nganga to transmit its message to the spirit vessel. Parts of the nganga may also be selected and used to create a guardiero ("guardian"), a vessel designed for a particular purpose; once that purpose is completed, the guardiero may be disassembled and its parts returned to the nganga. If the client's problem persists, the palero/palera will often recommend that the former undergoes an initiation into Palo to secure the protection and assistance of a nganga.

==== Bilongos ====
In Cuba, it is widely believed that illness may be caused by a malevolent spirit sent against the sick person by a palero or palera. Some Palo practitioners will identify the muertos oscuros ("dark dead"), entities that have been sent against an afflicted person by enemies, regarding such entities as hiding in plants, materialised in clothes or furniture, concealed in the walls, or taking animal form. If techniques like the limpieza or resguardos fail to deal with a client's problems, a Palo practitioner will often adopt more aggressive methods to assist the afflicted person. They will use divination to identify who it is that has cursed their client; they may then obtain traces of that alleged perpetrator's blood, sweat, or soil that they have walked over, so as to ritually manipulate them.

Palo counter-attacks are termed bilongos. Often housed inside a jar or bottle, these concoctions contain soils and powders, as well as dried toads, lizards, insects, spiders, human hair, or fish bones. For the bilongo to be effective, practitioners believe, it must be bound in blood to a particular nganga. Most bilongo will be buried close to the home of their victim, ideally in the latter's backyard or close to their front door. In Palo belief, the bilongo then draws the nfumbe spirit from out of the keeper's nganga to go and attack the intended victim. The spirit sent to attack may be called a muerto oscuro or enviación. This may be regarded not as the spirit of a dead individual but rather an entity specifically created for the purpose, a sort of "animate or living automaton". An attack of this nature is called a kindiambazo ("prenda hit") or a cazuelazo ("cauldron blow"). This in turn may result in a series of strikes and counter-strikes by different paleros or paleras acting for different clients. In embracing aggressive counter-attacks against perceived malefactors, Palo differs from Santería.

== History ==
=== Background ===
After the Spanish Empire conquered Cuba, the island's Arawak and Ciboney populations dramatically declined. The Spanish then turned to slaves sold at West African ports as a labor source for Cuba's sugar, tobacco, and coffee plantations. Slavery was widespread in West Africa, where prisoners of war and certain criminals were enslaved. Between 702,000 and 1 million enslaved Africans were brought to Cuba, the earliest in 1511, although the majority came in the 19th century. In Cuba, slaves were divided into groups termed naciones (nations), often based on their port of embarkation rather than their own ethno-cultural background.

Between 1760 and 1790 the largest nación in Cuba was the Bakongo, who then comprised over 30 percent of enslaved Africans on the island. At that time they were commonly called Congos, a general term applied to all Bantu-speaking peoples. Although all largely part of the same linguistic family, these enslaved Bakongo people spoke different languages and were not a uniform group. They came largely from in and around the Kingdom of Kongo, which covered an area encompassing what is now northern Angola, Cabinda, the Republic of Congo, and parts of both Gabon and the Democratic Republic of Congo. Enslaved Bakongo individuals transported to Cuba would often have brought their traditional religions with them, but many would also have been committed Christians. Roman Catholicism had been introduced to the Bakongo in the late 15th century, and throughout the 18th and 19th centuries, many foreign observers reported that the Bakongo widely considered themselves Christian.

I know of two African religions in the barracoons: the Lucumi and the Congolese... The Congolese used the dead and snakes for their religious rites. They called the dead nkise and the snakes emboba. They prepared big pots called nganga which would walk about and all, and that was where the secret of their spells lay. All the Congolese had these pots for mayombe.

— Esteban Montejo, a slave during the late 19th century

Key to many Bakongo religious traditions were objects containing spirit power, the minkisi, and it is from these that the Palo nganga derives. Minkisi could take various forms but were often baskets or bags, with some of the earliest recorded Cuban ngangas also being bags. The earliest unambiguous evidence for such a spirit-vessel on Cuba comes from 1875, when a Spanish periodical described an anthropomorphic wooden statue with a cavity in which medicines had been placed. Another account was that provided in the autobiography of the slave Esteban Montejo, who lived during the late 19th and early 20th centuries.

When the nganga emerged in its current form among Bakongo-descended peoples in Cuba is not known. The sociologist Jualynne E. Dodson suggested a possible link between the iron cauldrons used for nganga and those used to process sugar cane on the island. In the period of slavery, the nganga would probably have been one of the very few weapons that the enslaved could use against their owners. It is also possible that ritual roles centering around minkisi or nganga vessels "generated forms of social power" and thus some form of authority among enslaved Afro-Cuban populations.

In Spanish Cuba, Catholicism was the only religion that could be legally practiced. Cuba's Catholic Church made efforts to convert the enslaved Africans, but the instruction in Catholicism provided to the latter was typically perfunctory and sporadic. Traditional African rituals might have continued among some of the enslaved people who escaped the plantations to form independent colonies, or palenques. Others joined African mutual aid societies, the cabildos or cofradías, some of which were Bakongo-led and in which traditional rites could also be clandestinely held. Over time, Afro-Cubans of Bakongo ancestry would have lost the ability to speak Kikongo fluently and instead developed a hybrid lexicon combining Spanish with select Kikongo words, the latter often retaining a sense of mystery for their users.

=== Formation and early history ===
The chronological development of Palo is less clear than that of Santería. Taking earlier influences and fusing them into a new form, Palo developed as a distinct religion in the late 19th or early 20th century. It may have arisen in Havana, for by the turn of the 20th century it was being transmitted from the Matanzas area in the west of the island to the Oriente Province of the east. The historian John Thornton deemed it likely that Palo emerged from within one of the Bakongo cabildos.

Ochoa described Palo's formation as occurring "in conjunction with, or perhaps in response to", the formation of Santería, a Yoruba-based tradition which emerged in urban parts of western Cuba during the late 19th century. The historian Stephan Palmié commented that Palo showed "considerable influence" from Yoruba-derived religions and argued that, as Santería spread across Cuba in the late 19th and early 20th centuries, it influenced existing Kongo-derived traditions on the island. Ochoa argued that Santería was nevertheless able to become dominant over Palo because Yoruba understandings of theology were closer to those of Catholicism and could more easily adapt to it. Palo would also take influence from Spiritism, a religion based on the ideas of the French writer Allan Kardec that was of growing interest among the white peasantry, the Creole class, and the small urban middle class of late 19th-century Cuba.

Following the Cuban War of Independence, the island became an independent republic in 1898. In the republic, Afro-Cubans remained largely excluded from economic and political power, and negative stereotypes about them remained pervasive throughout the Euro-Cuban population. Although the republic's new constitution enshrined freedom of religion, campaigns were still launched against Afro-Cuban traditions. From the late 19th century, both Palo and Santería houses faced repeated police raids, with this harassment continuing through the middle of the 20th century. The turn of the 20th century saw repeated instances of Afro-Cubans being accused of sacrificing white Christian children to their ngangas. In 1904, a trial was held of Afro-Cubans accused of ritually murdering a toddler, Zoyla Díaz, to cure one of their members of sterility; two of the accused were found guilty and executed. References to the case passed down in Palo songs through subsequent generations, with later scholarly assessments suggesting that the accusations relied on "trumped up charges, rumour masquerading as evidence, racism and public hysteria".

The 1920s saw efforts to incorporate Afro-Cuban elements into a wider understanding of Cuban culture, as in the Afrocubanismo literary and artistic movement. These often drew upon Afro-Cuban music, dance, and mythology, but typically rejected African-derived ritual. During the 1940s, the Cuban anthropologist Lydia Cabrera studied Palo; writings by her and other scholars would later interest various initiates, who hoped that studying them could enrich the tradition.

=== After the Cuban Revolution ===
The Cuban Revolution of 1959 resulted in the island becoming a Marxist–Leninist state governed by Fidel Castro's Communist Party of Cuba. Committed to state atheism, Castro's government took a negative view of Afro-Cuban religions. However, following the Soviet Union's collapse in the 1990s, Castro's administration declared that Cuba was entering a "Special Period" in which new economic measures would be necessary. As part of this, priests of Santería, Ifá, and Palo all took part in government-sponsored tours for foreigners desiring initiation into such traditions. Ochoa noted that Palo "blossomed" amid these liberalising reforms of the mid-1990s.

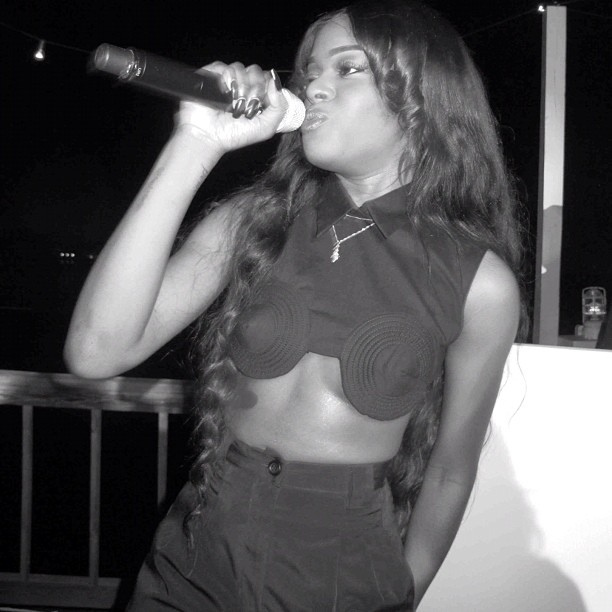
American rapper Azealia Banks has been open in her practice of Palo. In 2021, the scholar Elizabeth Pérez called Banks "the most (in)famous, vocal, and visible proponent of Black Atlantic traditions in recent times".

The decades after the Cuban Revolution saw hundreds of thousands of Cubans emigrate, including Palo practitioners. The 1960s saw Cuban emigres arrive in Venezuela, probably bringing Palo with them, something bolstered by further Cuban arrivals in the early 21st century. In the 2000s, residents reported that many of the graves at Caracas' Cementerio General del Sur had been pried open to have their contents removed for Palo ceremonies. Palo also appeared in Mexico: in 1989, the Cuban-American narcotrafficker Adolfo Constanzo and his gang were found to have killed at least 14 people on their ranch outside Matamoros, Tamaulipas, before placing their victims' bones in Palo cauldrons. Constanzo's group had combined Palo with elements from Mexican religions and a statue of the Mexican folk saint Santa Muerte was found on the property. Much media coverage incorrectly labelled these practices "Satanism".

Palo also established a presence in the United States. In 1995, the US Fish and Wildlife Service arrested a Palo initiate in Miami, Florida, who was in possession of human skulls and exotic animal remains. In Newark, New Jersey, in 2002, a Palo practitioner was found with the remains of at least two individuals in his nganga. A Palo follower was arrested in 2015 for allegedly stealing bones from mausoleums in Worcester, Massachusetts, while in 2021 two Florida practitioners were arrested for robbing the graves of military veterans. In several parts of the US, archaeologists and forensic anthropologists have frequently encountered nganga remains, often referring to them as "Santería skulls", a term that mistakes Santería for Palo; one example was recovered during the draining of a Massachusetts canal in 2012. The American rapper Azealia Banks has also been public about her practice of Palo Mayombe, discussing it and other African diasporic religions on social media from at least 2016.

== Denominations ==
Palo divides into different denominations or traditions called ramas, each forming a ritual lineage. The main four are Briyumba, Kimbisa, Mayombe, and Monte; other ramas include Musunde, Quirimbya, Bumpangi and Vrillumba. Some practitioners maintain that Mayombe and Monte are the same tradition, whereas elsewhere they have been regarded as separate. Because Palo Monte—the name of which means "sticks of the forest"—was one of the dominant ramas in late 20th-century Havana, many academic and popular sources mistakenly adopted the term "Palo Monte" for the whole religion. (Note: Among scholars who have used "Palo Monte" as a general term for the religion have been Wedel, Fernández Olmos and Paravisini-Gebert, and Kerestetzi.)

Many initiates believe that the names of the ramas derive from different ethnic groups from in and around the Kingdom of Kongo. Conversely, Barnet noted that these names cannot be identified with known ethnic groups in Central Africa and that "they may simply be randomly chosen names of Bantu etymology that became adulterated in Cuba". Palo's followers are often critical of rival ramas, believing that their own tradition maintains the correct procedure inherited from the past.

Especially syncretic in its approach to Palo is Kimbisa, the rama founded in the 19th century by Andrés Facundo Cristo de los Dolores Petit. Petit merged Palo with elements from Santería, Spiritism, and Catholicism, with the tradition operating on the principles of Christian charity. In Kimbisa praise houses, it is common to find images of the Virgin Mary, the saints, the crucifix, and an altar to San Luis Beltrán, the patron saint of the tradition. Unlike other ramas, Kimbisa has a supreme leader and a written constitution. Certain members of other Palo traditions look critically upon Kimbisa, believing that it deviates too far from traditional Bakongo practices. The Palo nganga has also been incorporated into a Cuban variant of Spiritism, El Espiritismo Cruzao, elsewhere termed Palo Cruzado, or Muertería.

== Demographics ==
Palo is found all over Cuba, although it is particularly strong in the island's eastern provinces. Describing the situation in the 2000s, Ochoa noted that there were "hundreds if not more" Palo praise houses active in Cuba, and in 2015 Kerestetzi commented that the religion is "widespread" on the island. Although emerging from Bakongo traditions, Palo has also been practiced by Afro-Cubans of other ethnic heritages, as well as by Euro-Cubans, criollos, and people outside Cuba. In the United States, for example, Palo has gained popularity among young people in various urban areas.

In Cuba, people are sometimes willing to travel considerable distances to consult with a particular palero or palera about their problems. People first approach the religion because they seek practical help in resolving their issues, not because they wish to worship its deities. In cases like this, Palo is often favoured over other religions because it claims to provide quicker results, with Palo sometimes deemed more powerful, if less ethical, in its approach than Santería.

== Reception ==
In Cuban society, Palo is both valued and feared. Ochoa described a "considerable air of dread" surrounding it in Cuban society, while Kerestetzi noted that Cubans usually regard paleros and paleras as "dangerous and unscrupulous witches". This is often linked to the stereotype that paleros and paleras might kill children for inclusion in their nganga; Ochoa noted that in the 1990s he heard Cuban parents warn their children that a "black man with a sack" would carry them off to feed his cauldron.

Palo has also become associated with criminal practice, in part due to the illegal nature of obtaining buried human remains; in Cuba, a conviction for grave desecration can result in a prison sentence of up to 30 years. The existence of Palo has impacted the burial of various individuals in Cuba. Remigio Herrera, the last surviving African-born babalawo, or priest of Ifá, was for instance buried in an unidentified grave to prevent paleros/paleras digging his corpse up for incorporation in their nganga.

Palo has also been incorporated in popular culture, as in Leonardo Padura Fuentes' 2001 novel Adiós Hemingway. By the start of the 21st century, various Cuban artists were incorporating Palo imagery into their work; one example was José Bedia Valdés, who received the mpungu Sarabanda at his initiation into Palo. In other cases, artists and graphic artists have used Palo firmas in their work without being initiates of the religion.
