= Nzambici =

Bakongo goddess

- Moon, Earth and Sky Mother
- Venerated in: Kongo religion
- Planet: Earth
- Symbols: Moon, Earth
- Ethnic group: Bakongo
- Consort: Nzambi Ampungu

Equivalents
- Nubian: Amesemi
- Igbo: Ala
- Akan: Asase Ya

Nzambici (also called Nzambi) is the eternal Goddess of Essence, as well as Moon, Earth and Sky Mother in Bakongo religion. She is also the female counterpart of the Kongo creator god, Nzambi Ampungu.

== History ==
By the 17th century, Nzambici's importance seems to have diminished. Oral tradition from the period states that Nzambi Ampungu, also called Nzambi, was surrounded by lesser spirits, including Nzambici. There is consensus among historians that this reduction of nature spirits to lesser spirits was due to the Portuguese influence of monotheism and their shunning of "idols." Whereas Nzambici and Nzambi were once "the marvel of marvels," Nzambi began to exist independently of Nzambici, and was seen as a supreme Creator God, similar to the Christian God of Portuguese colonizers.

== Kongo cosmology ==
The Bakongo people believe that "The world in its beginning was empty; it was an mbûngi, an empty thing, a cavity, without visible life." Mbûngi (also called mwasi and mpampa) was symbolized as a circle of emptiness. The creator god Nzambi, along with his female counterpart called Nzambici, is believed to have created a spark of fire, called kalûnga, and summoned it inside of mbûngi. Kalûnga grew and became a great force of energy inside of mbûngi, creating a mass of fusion. When the mass grew too hot, the heated force caused the mass to break apart and hurl projectiles outside of mbûngi. Those projectiles became individual masses that scattered about, and when the fires cooled, planets were created. The Bakongo believe this was the process Nzambi used to create the universe, with the Sun, stars, planets, etc. Nzambi Ampungu then became Kalûnga, the god of fire and change.

== Nzambici and Nzambi ==
Wanting to expand his creation, some oral traditions say that Nzambi crafted his female counterpart named Nzambici, the god of essence. Other oral traditions say Nzambici always existed alongside Nzambi as an eternal goddess in her own right.

Nevertheless, they lived as one, watching over all they had made. That was until Nzambici stole some of his fire, or kalûnga, and gained power of her own. To punish her, Nzambi is said to have created the earth and sent her there. But unable to stay away from her for too long, he returned to earth and married Nzambici. On earth, they created the waters, the land and the animals. She subsequently became "the god on earth, the great princess, the mother of all the animals, the one who promises her daughter to the animal who shall bring her the fire from heaven."

Nzambici and Nzambi then created the first Kongo person, or muntu. Nzambici also became the great mystery of the earth, "the mother of a beautiful daughter, gives mankind all laws, ordinances, arts, games, and musical instruments." She "settles quarrels between animals, and in the stories giving her decision is embedded an immense amount of Fjort law." To guide man, Nzambici and Nzambi created nature spirits—simbi, nkisi, nkita, and kilundu—and separated the physical world, called Nseke, from the spiritual world, called Mpémba, with a boundary of water, called the kalûnga line. A mystical forest, mfinda, ran between the worlds, where nature spirits and the ancestors could travel from one world to the other and advise the living. Nzambici and Nzambi withdrew from the earth and took their place in the heavens, choosing to no longer interact with man. Man knew Nzambici as the earth and moon and Nzambi as the sun. Because of the duality of Nzambici and Nzambi, the Kongo people believed that the right side of the body was male, while the left side was believed to be female.

== See also ==
- Bunzi
- Kongo cosmogram
- Kongo religion
- Lunar deity
- Simbi
- Sky deity
