= Kongo cosmogram =

Sacred symbol in Bakongo spirituality

The Kongo Cosmogram
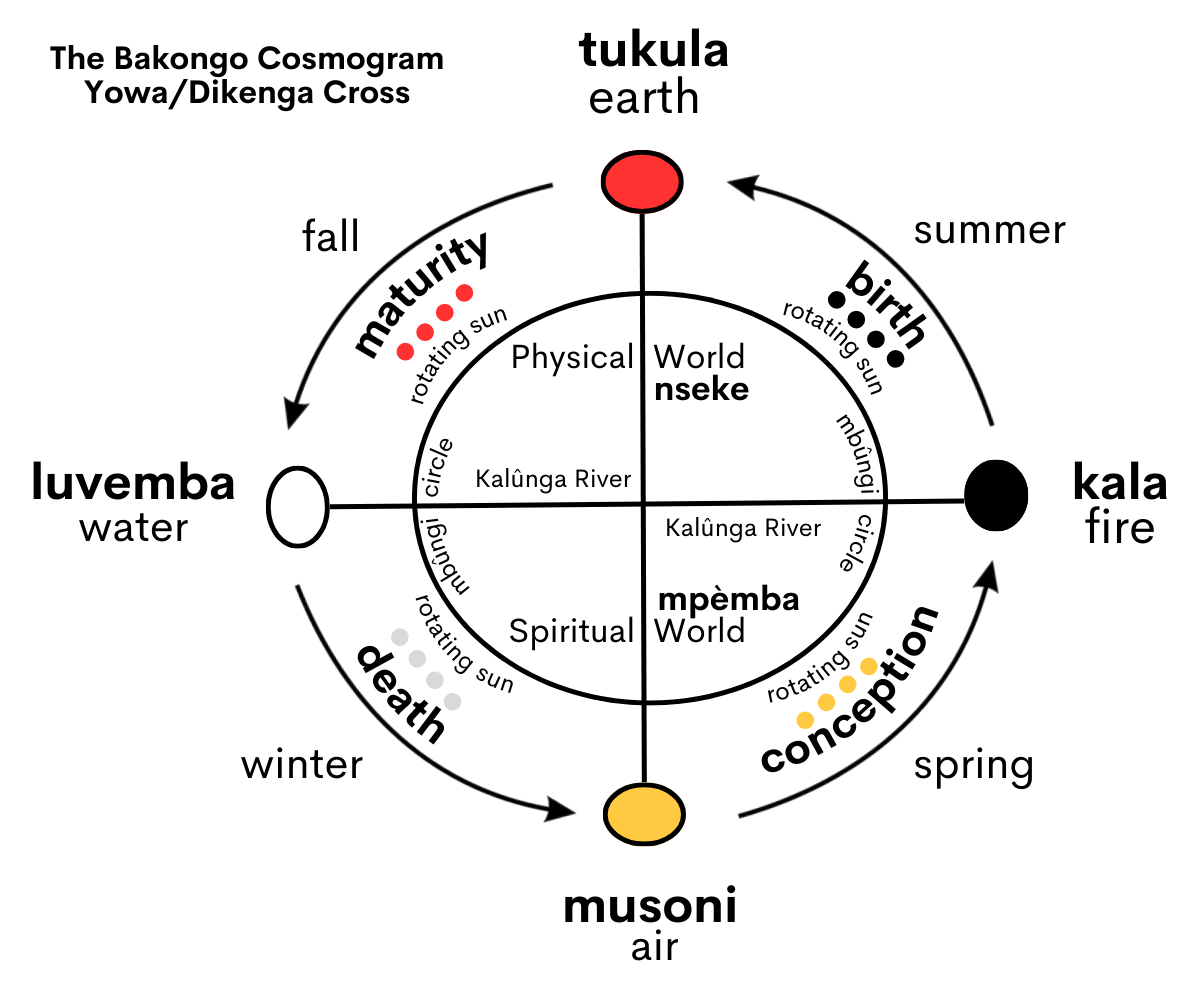
- Affiliation: Kongo religion · Hoodoo
- Ethnic group: Kongo people

The Kongo cosmogram (also called yowa or dikenga cross, Kikongo: dikenga dia Kongo or tendwa kia nza-n' Kongo) is a core symbol in Kongo religion that depicts the physical world (Ku Nseke), the spiritual world (Ku Mpémba), the vertical Mukula line that connects the two worlds, the horizontal Kalûnga line and sacred river that runs between the two worlds, the rotating sun that forms a circle around the two worlds, the four moments of the sun, and the four elements.

== History ==
Ethnohistorical sources and material culture demonstrate that the Kongo cosmogram existed as a long-standing symbolic tradition within the Kongo culture before European contact in 1482, and that it continued in use in Central Africa through the early twentieth century. In its fullest embellishment, this symbol served as an emblematic representation of the Kongo people and summarized a broad array of ideas and metaphoric messages that comprised their sense of identity within the cosmos.

The Kongo cosmogram was introduced to the Americas by Bakongo people who fell victim to the trans-Atlantic slave trade. Archaeological findings in the United States show evidence that the symbol was honored by Black Americans, who drew the Kongo cosmogram on the walls of church basements and engraved it in pottery.

== Parts of the cosmogram ==
=== Kalûnga and the two worlds ===
The Bakongo people believe that "The world in its beginning was empty; it was an mbûngi, an empty thing, a cavity, without visible life." Mbûngi (also called mwasi and mpampa) was symbolized as a circle of emptiness. The creator god Nzambi, along with his female counterpart called Nzambici, is believed to have created a spark of fire, called kalûnga, and summoned it inside of mbûngi. Kalûnga grew and became a great force of energy inside of mbûngi, creating a mass of fusion. When the mass grew too hot, the heated force caused the mass to break apart and hurl projectiles outside of mbûngi. Those projectiles became individual masses that scattered about, and when the fires cooled, planets were created.

The Bakongo believe this was the process Nzambi used to create the universe, with the sun, stars, planets, etc. The Bakongo referred to this process as luku lwalamba Nzambi, or "God created and cooked dough." Because of this, kalûnga is seen as the origin of life, or moyo wawo mu nza, and the Bakongo believe that life requires constant change and perpetual motion. Thus, Nzambi is also referred to as Kalûnga, the God of change. Similarities between the Bakongo belief of Kalûnga and the Big Bang Theory have been studied. Unlike many other traditional African spiritualities, the creation beliefs of the Bakongo are compatible with creatio ex nihilo.

After creation, the nature of Kalûnga shifted when Nzambi separated the physical world, or Ku Nseke, from the spiritual (ancestral) world, or Ku Mpémba, with the Kalûnga line. The line became a river, carrying people between the worlds at birth and death, and mbûngi became the rotating sun. At death, or the sun's setting, the process repeats, and a person is reborn. In Kikongo, the word Kalûnga means "threshold between worlds." Accordingly, the Kalûnga line acts as a barrier between the two worlds and leads all Bakongo people, or muntu, through the four stages of life.

Together, the Kalûnga line and the mbûngi circle form part of the Kongo cosmogram, also called the Yowa or Dikenga Cross. A simbi (pl. bisimbi) is a water spirit that is believed to inhabit bodies of water and rocks, having the ability to guide bakulu, or the ancestors, along the Kalûnga line to the spiritual world after death. They are also present during the baptisms of African American Christians, according to Hoodoo tradition.

=== Four moments of the sun ===
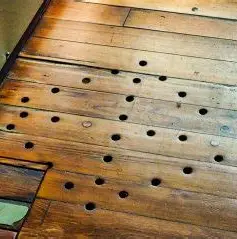
The Kongo cosmogram was chiseled into the wooden floor of the historic First African Baptist Church in Savannah, GA, suggesting traditional Bakongo spiritual practices were infused with Christianity in the United States.

According to Molefi Kete Asante, "Another important characteristic of Bakongo cosmology is the sun and its movements. The rising, peaking, setting, and absence of the sun provide the essential pattern for Bakongo religious culture. These 'four moments of the sun' equate with the four stages of life: conception, birth, maturity, and death. For the Bakongo, everything transitions through these stages: planets, plants, animals, people, societies, and even ideas. This vital cycle is depicted by a circle with a cross inside. In this cosmogram or dikenga, the meeting point of the two lines of the cross is the most powerful point and where the person stands."

Then the process repeats and Bakongo are reborn. Together, Kalûnga and the mbûngi circle form the Yowa or Dikenga Cross. The four corners of the cross are believed to represent musoni time, kala time, tukula time, and luvemba time. They correspond to the four moments of the sun, the four stages of life and the four elements.

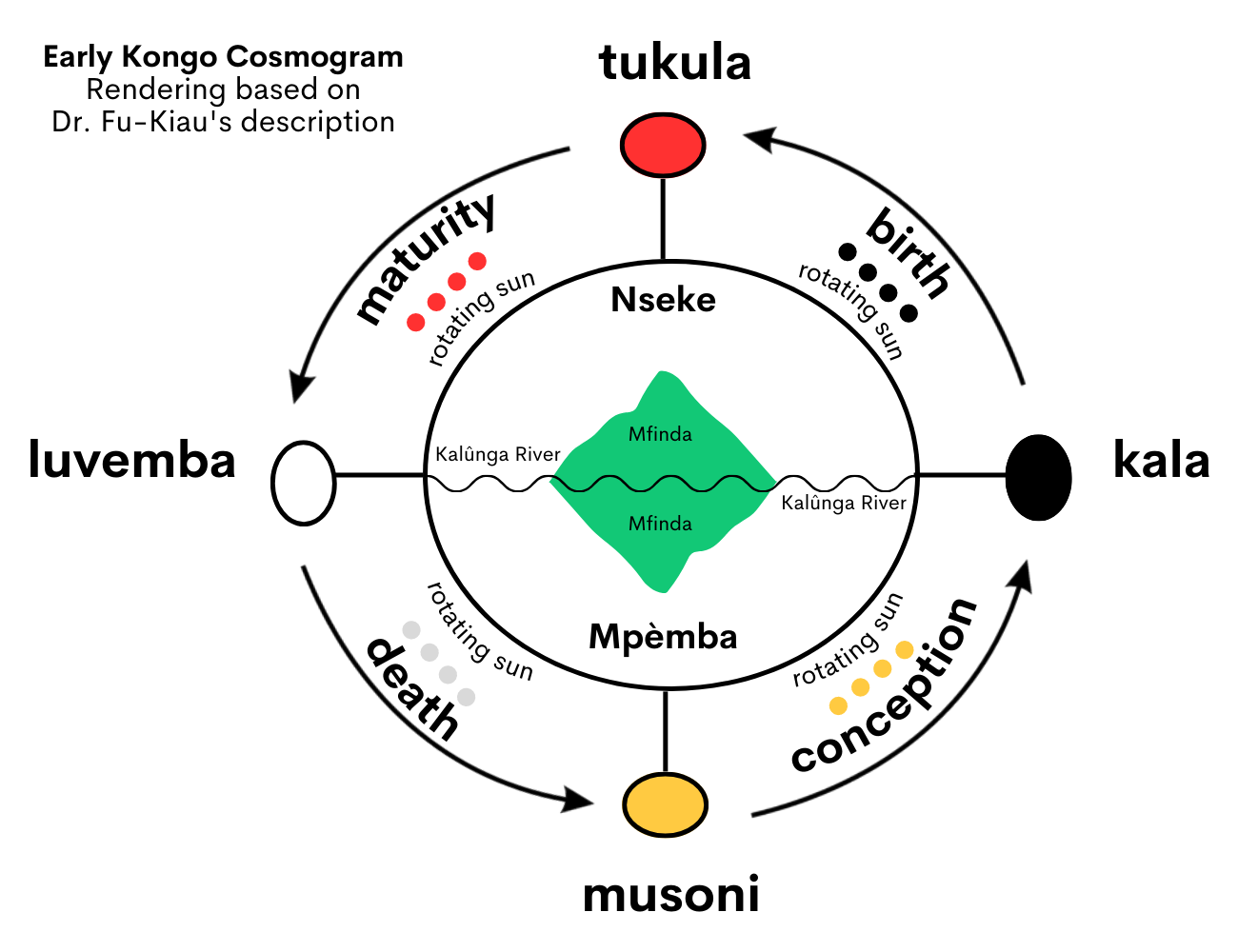
Alternate Kongo cosmogram

=== Mfinda ===
Nature is also essential in the Kongo religion. While simbi spirits later became more associated with water, or kalûnga, they were also known to dwell in the forest, or mfinda (finda in Hoodoo). The Kingdom of Kongo used the term chibila, which referred to sacred groves, where they would venerate these forest spirits. The Kingdom of Loango called them bakisi banthandu, or spirits of the wilderness. The Kingdom of Ndongo preferred the name xibila (pl. bibila).

The Kongo people also believed that some ancestors inhabited the forest after death and maintained their spiritual presence in their descendants' lives. These particular ancestors were believed to have died, traveled to Mpémba, and then were reborn as bisimbi. Thus, The Great Mfinda existed as a meeting point between the physical world and the spiritual world. The living saw it as a source of physical nourishment through hunting and spiritual nourishment through contact with the ancestors. One expert on Kongo religion, Dr. Fu-Kiau, even described some precolonial Kongo cosmograms with mfinda as a bridge between the two worlds.

== See also ==
- Capoeira
- Engolo
- Hoodoo (spirituality)
- Knocking and kicking
- Mami Wata
- Simbi
