= Bunzi =

Bakongo rain goddess

- Venerated in: Kongo religion
- Symbol: Water • Rainbow
- Region: Democratic Republic of the Congo; Republic of the Congo
- Ethnic group: Bantu peoples

Genealogy
- Parents: Mboze, Makanga
- Dynasty: Kingdom of Ngoyo • Kingdom of Kongo

Bunzi (also Mpulu Bunzi and Phulu Bunzi) is a serpent water spirit and goddess of rain in traditional Kongo religion that was first venerated by the Woyo people of the Kingdom of Ngoyo.

== Appearance ==
Bunzi is sometimes depicted as a multicolored serpent that rewards those who worship her with an abundant harvest. She also said to appear in the rippling water of the river at sunset.

== Beliefs ==
According to the oral tradition of the Kongo people, Bunzi is the daughter of Mboze, the Great Mother and wife of Kuitikuiti. Bunzi is sometimes depicted as a multicolored serpent, and rewards those who worship her with an abundant harvest. When Mboze gave birth, Bunzi was born in the form of a baby serpent. Upon seeing the child, Mboze's husband Kuitikuiti knew that she had been unfaithful to him. When he learned the biological father of Bunzi was their son Makanga, he killed Mboze for her transgression. Bunzi took on her mother's rain-bringing power. According to legend, when a rainbow appears in the sky, that is Bunzi.

The Yombe people of the Republic of the Congo refer to Bunzi as Phulu Bunzi and consider the spirit to be a male lord of the water. He is said to have devised a pact between Nzazi (the god of thunder) and Mbumba (the rainbow water serpent) to create harmony between the earth and the skies. One day while he was visiting Mbumba, his son died. Consequently, Phulu Bunzi blamed Mbumba and cut his head off.

== Legacy ==
The Bunzi Mons, a mountain on Venus, is named after her.

== See also ==
- Simbi
- Jengu
- Kianda
- Mami Wata
