= Sundi =

Ethnic group in the Democratic Republic of Congo

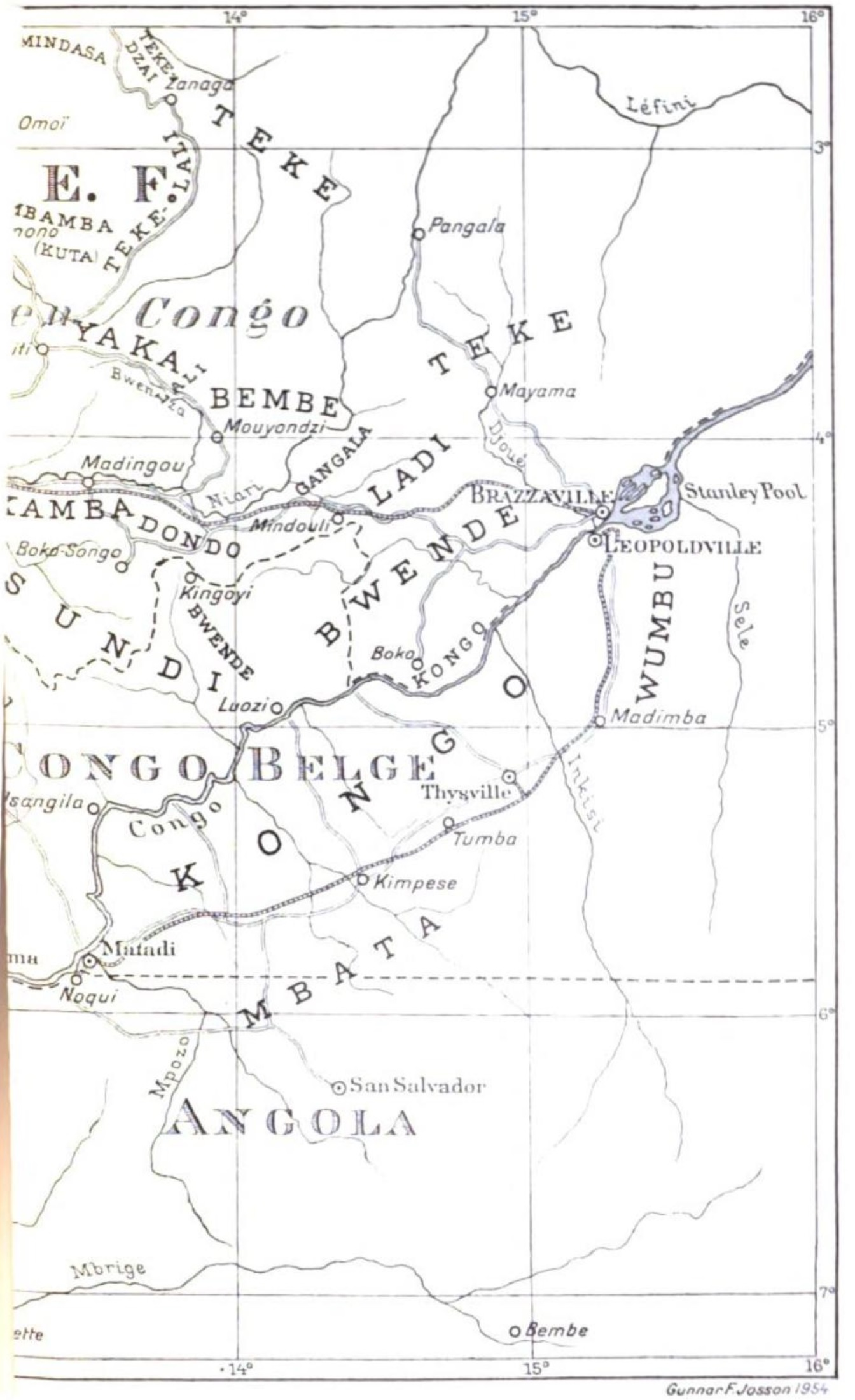
Map showing the area where the Sundi lives.

The Sundi (also Sundis, Nsundi, Basundi, Kongo-Sundi, Suundi and Manyanga) are a Central African people established in three countries, in the Republic of Congo – particularly in the Niari department (Kimongo and Londes-Lakayes), in the Bouenza department (Boko-Songho) and in the Pool Department –, in Angola (Cabinda) and in the Democratic Republic of Congo. They are considered to be the largest subgroup of the Kongo people. Early in the nineteenth century there were wars between Sundi and Teke when Teke moved southwest into the Niari valley.
