= Kongo religion =

Traditional religion of the Bakongo people

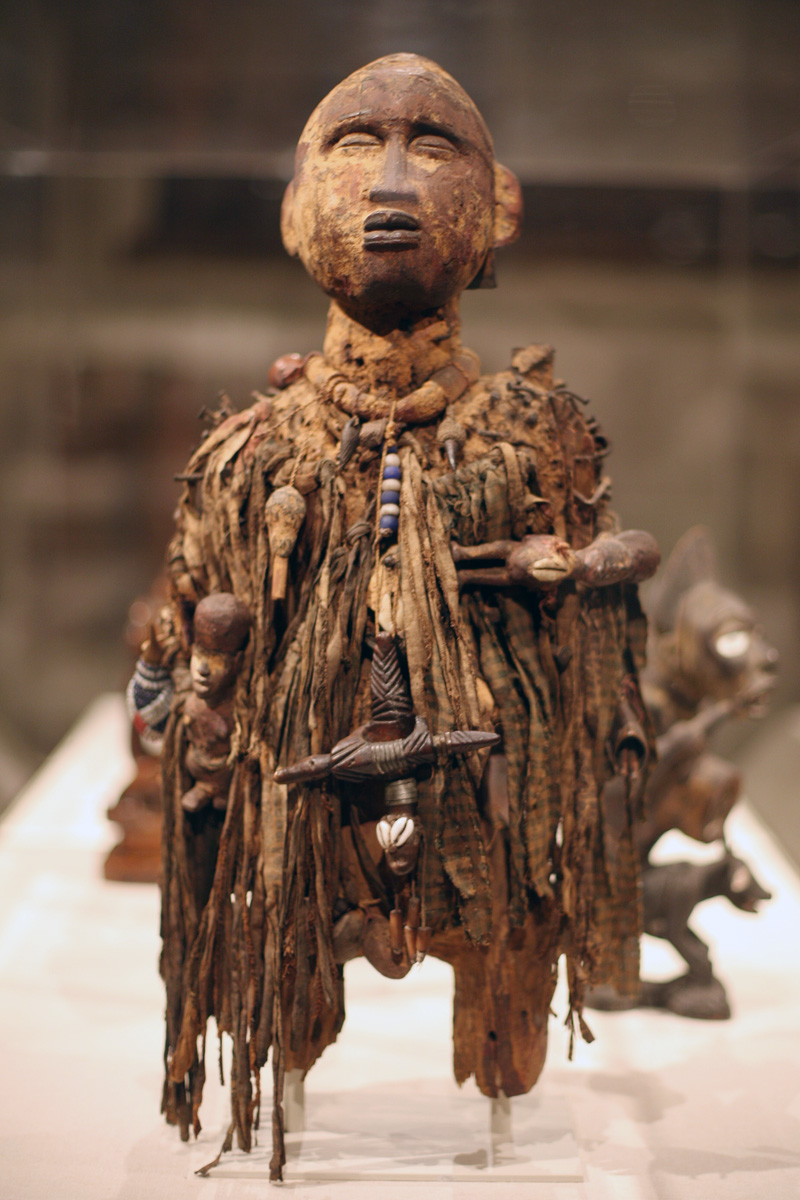
- Male power figure (Nkisi), Kongo artist and nganga, late 19th–mid-20th century, Democratic Republic of the Congo
- Type: Bakongo
- Region: Central Africa
- Language: Kikongo
- Territory: The northern tip of Angola • western Democratic Republic of the Congo • the southern tip of Gabon • the southern half of the Republic of the Congo
- Origin: Kingdom of Vungu • Seven Kingdoms of Kongo dia Nlaza

Kongo religion (Kikongo: Bukongo or Bakongo) encompasses the traditional spiritual beliefs of the Bakongo people. Due to the highly centralized position of the Kingdom of Kongo, its leaders were able to influence much of the traditional religious practices across the Congo Basin. As a result, many other ethnic groups and kingdoms in West-Central Africa, like the Chokwe and Ambundu, adopted elements of Bakongo spirituality.

The spirituality is based on a complex animistic system and a pantheon of spirits. The principle Creator God of the world is Nzambi Ampungu, the sovereign master, and his female counterpart, Nzambici. While Nzambi Ampungu, who gave birth to the universe and the spirits who inhabit it, is vital to the spirituality, ancestor veneration is the core principle.

The Bakongo cosmos is split between two worlds: the top half representing the physical world, or ku nseke and the bottom half representing the spiritual world, or ku mpèmba. Expert healers, known as Banganga, undergo extensive training to commune with the ancestors in the spiritual realms and seek guidance from them.

== General beliefs ==
The religion of the Kongo is deeply complex. According to historians John K. Thornton and Linda M. Heywood, "Central Africans have probably never agreed among themselves as to what their cosmology is in detail, a product of what I called the process of continuous revelation and precarious priesthood..." However, the Kongo people had a consensus view amongst themselves, with traditional religious thought best developed in the northern Kikongo-speaking area. There is plenty of description about Kongo religious ideas in the Christian missionary and colonial era records, but as Thornton states, "these are written with a hostile bias and their reliability is problematic".

Generally, these traditions are oral rather than scriptural and passed down from one generation to another through folk tales, songs, and festivals, include belief in an amount of higher and lower gods, sometimes including a supreme creator or force, belief in spirits, veneration of the dead, use of magic and traditional African medicine. Bakongo mythology, like other nearby traditional religions, can be described as animistic with various polytheistic and pantheistic aspects. This includes the worship of tutelary deities, nature worship, ancestor worship and the belief in an afterlife. While some religions adopted a Panentheistic worldview, most follow a polytheistic system with various gods and spirits.

== Creation and cosmology ==
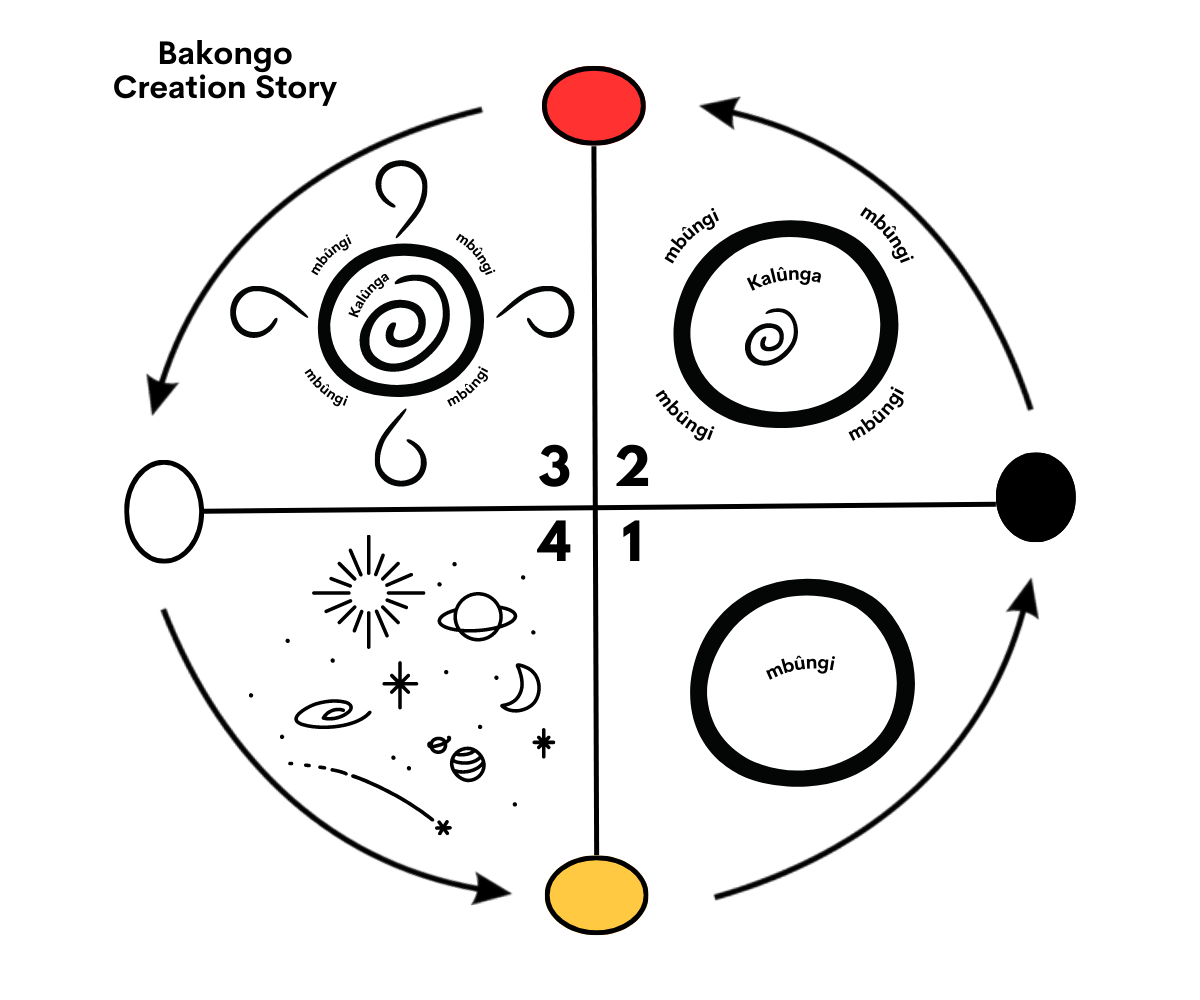
Kongo Creation Story

According to researcher Molefi Kete Asante, "Another important characteristic of Bakongo cosmology is the Sun and its movements. The rising, peaking, setting, and absence of the Sun provide the essential pattern for Bakongo religious culture." These "four moments of the sun" equate with the four stages of life: conception, birth, maturity, and death. For the Bakongo, everything transitions through these stages: planets, plants, animals, people, societies, and even ideas. This vital cycle is depicted by a circle with a cross inside. In this Yowa or dikenga cosmogram, the meeting point of the two lines of the cross is the most powerful point and where the person stands.

=== Creation of the universe ===
The Bakongo people believe that "The world in its beginning was empty; it was an mbûngi, an empty thing, a cavity, without visible life." Mbûngi (also called mwasi and mpampa) was symbolized as a circle of emptiness. The creator god Nzambi, along with his female counterpart called Nzambici, is believed to have created a spark of fire, called kalûnga, and summoned it inside of mbûngi. Kalûnga grew and became a great force of energy inside of mbûngi, creating a mass of fusion. When the mass grew too hot, the heated force caused the mass to break apart and hurl projectiles outside of mbûngi. Those projectiles became individual masses that scattered about, and when the fires cooled, planets formed and life came into existence. The Bakongo believe this was the process Nzambi used to create the universe, with the sun, stars, planets, etc. The Bakongo referred to this process as luku lwalamba Nzambi, or "God created and cooked dough." Because of this, kalûnga is seen as the origin of life, or moyo wawo mu nza and a force of motion. The Bakongo believe that life requires constant change and perpetual motion. Nzambi is also referred to as Kalûnga, the god of change. Similarities between the Bakongo belief of kalûnga and the Big Bang Theory have been studied. Unlike many other traditional African religions, the creation beliefs of the Bakongo are compatible with creatio ex nihilo.

=== Creation of Earth ===
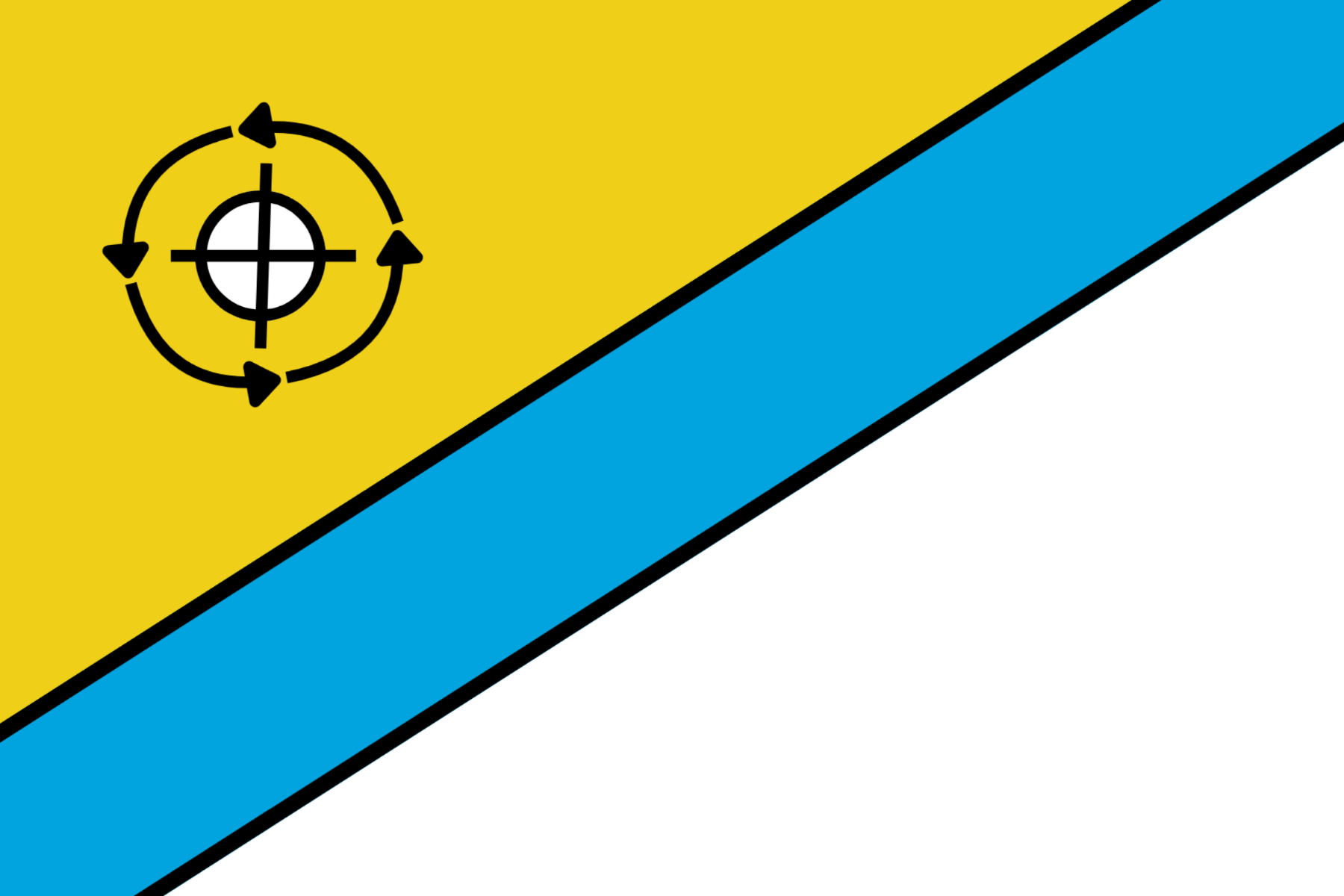
Bearing the Kongo cosmogram at its center, this flag symbolizes Kongo identity. Golden yellow represents the sun and rich resources of their lands. Light blue represents the Congo river and Kalûnga sea. White represents the spiritual nature of the Bakongo people and their freedom in Central Africa and across the American diaspora.

Like the creation of the universe, the Bakongo believe that in the beginning, the world was lifeless, circular void of nothingness (or mbûngi). Then Nzambi created a great force of fire (or kalûnga), and filled this empty circle. Kalûnga heated up the contents of mbûngi, and when it cooled, it formed the Earth. The Earth, the starting point of the fire, then became a green planet after it went through four stages. The first stage is the emergence of the fire. The second stage is the red stage where the planet is still burning and has not formed. The third stage is the grey stage where the planet is cooling, but has not produced life. These planets are naked, dry, and covered with dust. The final stage is green stage is when the planet is fully mature because it breathes and carries life. As the Bakongo believe is part of the universal order, all planets must go through this process in order to achieve completeness, or nlunga.

=== Human creation ===
The creation of a Bakongo person, or muntu, is also believed to follow the four moments of the Sun, which play a significant role in their development. Musoni is the time when a muntu is conceived both in the spiritual realm and in the womb of a Bakongo woman. Kala is the time when a muntu is born into the physical world. This time is also seen as the rising of the Sun. Tukula is the time of maturity, where a muntu learns to master all aspects of life from spirituality to purpose to personality. The last period of time is luvemba, when a muntu physically dies and enters the spiritual world, or Ku Mpémba, with of the ancestors, or bakulu. Because Bakongo people have a "dual soul-mind," or mwèla-ngindu, they are able to exist and live in both realms during the different moments of their lives. Even while in Ku Mpémba, a muntu still lives a full life as they prepare for Kala time once again. The right side of the body is also believed to be male, while the left side is believed to be female, creating an additional layer to the dual identity of a muntu or Kimuntu, the state of being a human.

=== Kongo cosmogram ===
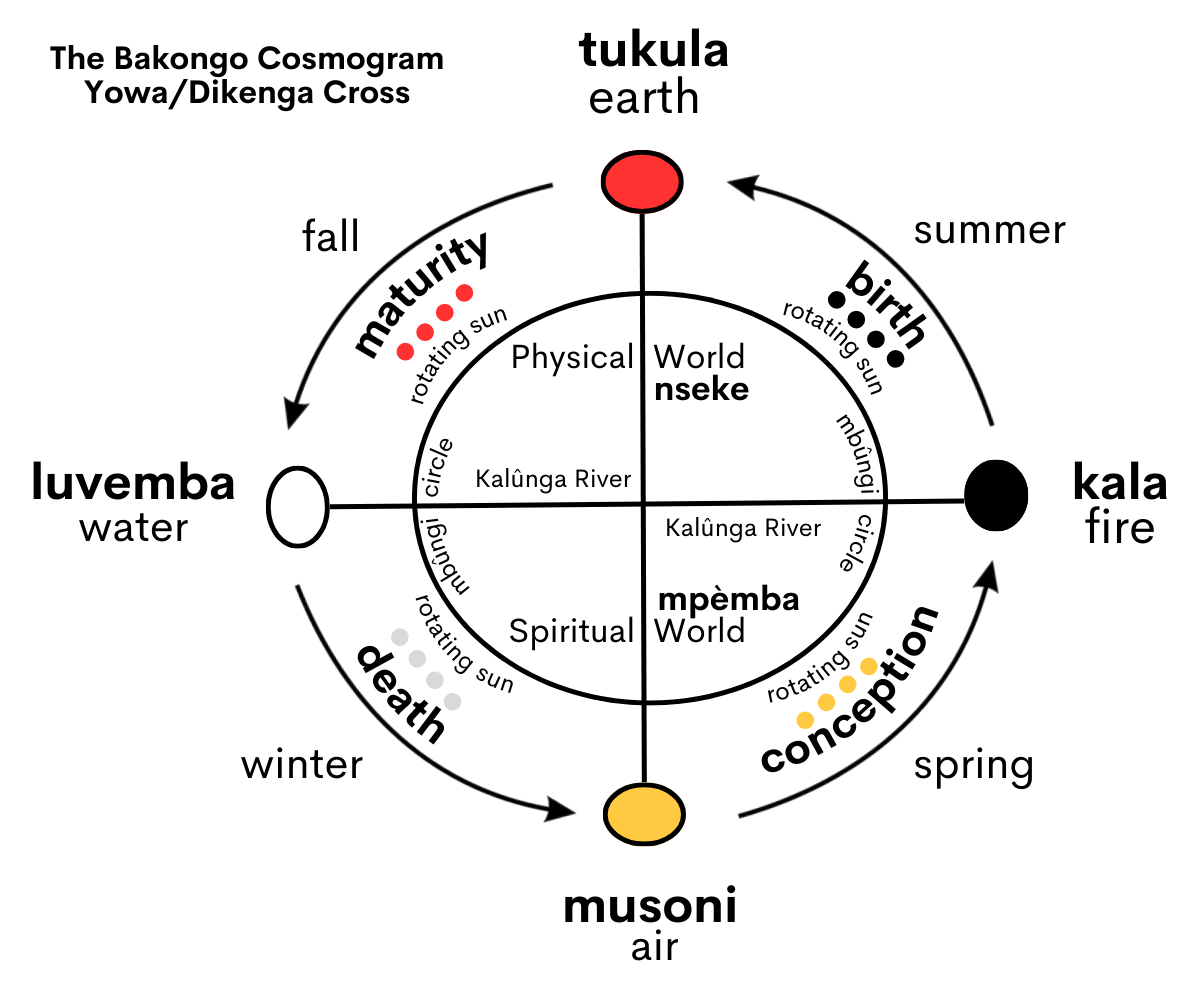
Kongo cosmogram

The nature of Kalûnga is also spiritual. As Kalûnga filled mbûngi, Kalûnga transformed into a body of water that acted as a line, dividing the circle in half. The top half represents the physical world, or Ku Nseke, while the bottom half represents the spiritual world of the ancestors, known as Ku Mpèmba. The mbûngi circle, one longer a void, became the universe with the Sun at the center.

The Kalûnga Line separates these two worlds, and all living things exists on one side or another. Simbi spirits are believed to transport Kongo people between the two worlds at birth and death. Then the process repeats when a person is reborn. Together, Kalûnga and the mbûngi circle form the Kongo cosmogram, also called the Yowa or Dikenga Cross.

Represented on the Kongo cosmogram are the four stages of life: musoni, or conception; kala, or birth; tukala, or maturity; and luvemba, or death. They are believed to correlate to the four moments of the sun: midnight, or n'dingu-a-nsi; sunrise, or ndiminia; noon, or mbata; and sunset, or ndmina, as well as the four seasons (spring, summer, fall and winter) and the four classical elements (water, fire, air and earth).

== Nzambi Ampungu and Nzambici ==
Prior to European colonization, Nzambi Ampungu and his female counterpart, Nzambici, were perceived as the one Great Spirit who existed everywhere simultaneously and gave life to all things. Nzambi Ampungu was the "sovereign master," the God of the sun (fire) and change. It was believed that Nzambi Ampungu/Nzambici created the universe, the spiritual world (Ku Mpémba) and the physical world (Ku Nseke). Contrary to what the title "the Great Spirit" implies, Nzambi Ampungu/Nzambici and the spiritual nature of the Kongo people did not exist under the same confines of hierarchy as the omnipotent God of the monotheistic Abrahamic religions (Christianity, Judaism and Islam). All spirits within Kongo spirituality were believed to be of equal status and each had their own purpose across both worlds.

After the introduction of Catholicism by the Portuguese, there was a massive effort to convert Central Africans by creating connections between Christianity and their traditional religions. While it was largely a failure for ethnic groups such as the Ambundu, the Portuguese were able to deceive the Bakongo people by convincing them that Nzambi was the Christian God and separating the deity from Nzambici and the other spirits. Not only did this act make way for an easier conversion of the Bakongo people to Christianity, it created a hierarchy in Bakongo spirituality that reduced spirits like Nzambici, the simbi and nkisi to "lesser spirits" that no longer had relevant voices in spiritual matters. They became akin to angels and thus, subservient to Nzambi Ampungu, or God. This may have also played a role in the Kingdom of Kongo becoming a more male-dominated society, marginalizing the belief in the dual male/female identity of all Bakongo people and creating a gender hierarchy based on Portuguese culture, where men were traditionally at the center of spiritual matters.

== Other spirits ==
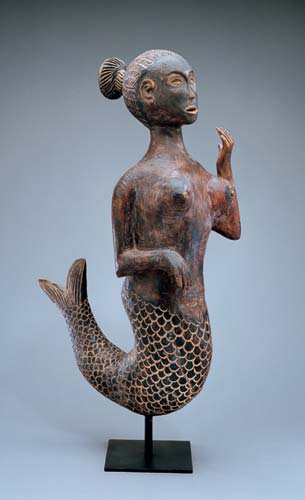
Depiction of a simbi water spirit

By the early 17th century, oral tradition stated that Nzambi Ampungu was surrounded by lesser nature spirits, who were so powerful that they were given individual names. There is consensus among historians that this reduction of nature spirits to lesser spirits was due to Portuguese the influence of monotheism and their shunning of "idols." During this period, Nzambi Ampungu began to exist as a separate spirit from his female counterpart, Nzambici, and was seen the Creator God, while Nzambici was seen as his wife, the "God the essence, the god on earth, the great princess, the mother of all the animals, the one who promises her daughter to the animal who shall bring her the fire from heaven." She is also referred to as Nzambi, the mystery of the earth, "the mother of a beautiful daughter, gives mankind all laws, ordinances, arts, games, and musical instruments. Nzambi settles quarrels between animals, and in the stories giving her decision is embedded an immense amount of Fjort law."

Nevertheless, the Kongo spirits are believed to have been created largely as a means for the Bakongo people to understand the natural world around them. Most of them have a connection to the earth, water, the sky, fire and the stars. "The land is eternal. The earth withers in the dry seasons but flourishes with the coming of the rains. The sky bears the winds that brings the rains and shuffles the clouds to hide and then reveal the sun's rays... the Nzadi River flows forever... to eventually join the vast sea."

At the center of Kongo religion are the ancestors, or bakulu, who are believed to maintain a spiritual existence in the physical world (Ku Nseke) after death, through the "dual soul-mind" (mwèla-ngindu). Because of this, the ancestors are seen as spirits, who watch over the Bakongo people and direct power from the spiritual world (Ku Mpémba) to protect them. These ancestral spirits are also believed to inhabit bodies of water, known as kalunga (also called n'langu or m'bu), and the forest, known as mfinda.

=== High spirits ===
Nzazi is the nature spirit of thunder, and Lusiemo is the nature spirit of lightning. Spiritual experts who dedicated themselves to Nzazi gained the title a Nganga Nzazi (Nganga means expert in Kikongo) and invoked his power to cause thunder, lightning and rain during the dry season through consecrated objects, called nkisi. It was believed that a Nganga Nzazi could also use the power of thunder and lightning as a spiritual weapon. This power activated when a Nganga Nzazi simulated the sound of thunder by knocking two consecrated sculptures, called biteke, together.

Ngonde is spirit of Moon and menstruations, and his brother Ntangu is spirit of time and Sun. It is said that the brother originally lived by the sea, and one day, Ntangu challenged Ngonde to a foot race, believing he could beat his brother. However, Ngonde was successful and defeated Ntangu. This is believed to be the reason why the Moon can be seen during the day with the Sun, but the Sun cannot be seen at night.

Chicamassi-chinuinji is the ruler of seas and oceans. Mpulu Bunzi is the goddess of the rain and harvest. In some Kongo villages, Bunzi is a male spirit called Phulu Bunzi, who is believed to be the chief blacksmith and lord spirit of the waters. Mbumba is the rainbow and a water serpent who reached the sky by climbing trees.

=== Simbi ===
A simbi (pl. bisimbi) is a water spirit that is believed to inhabit bodies of water and rocks, having the ability to guide the ancestors, along the Kalûnga river to the spiritual world after they pass away. They are seen as the guardians of nature and the intermediaries between the physical world of the living and the spiritual world of the ancestors. Bisimbi are also believed to be spiritual guides, using storytelling and oral tradition to connect the living to the ancestors and their history. Spiritual leaders called banganga (sing. nganga) underwent an extensive initiation process to learn the position of the sun as it rotated around the earth to seek guidance from the ancestors and the bisimbi. These water spirits were said to be present during the baptisms of African American Christians, according to Hoodoo tradition.

=== Nkisi and nature spirits ===
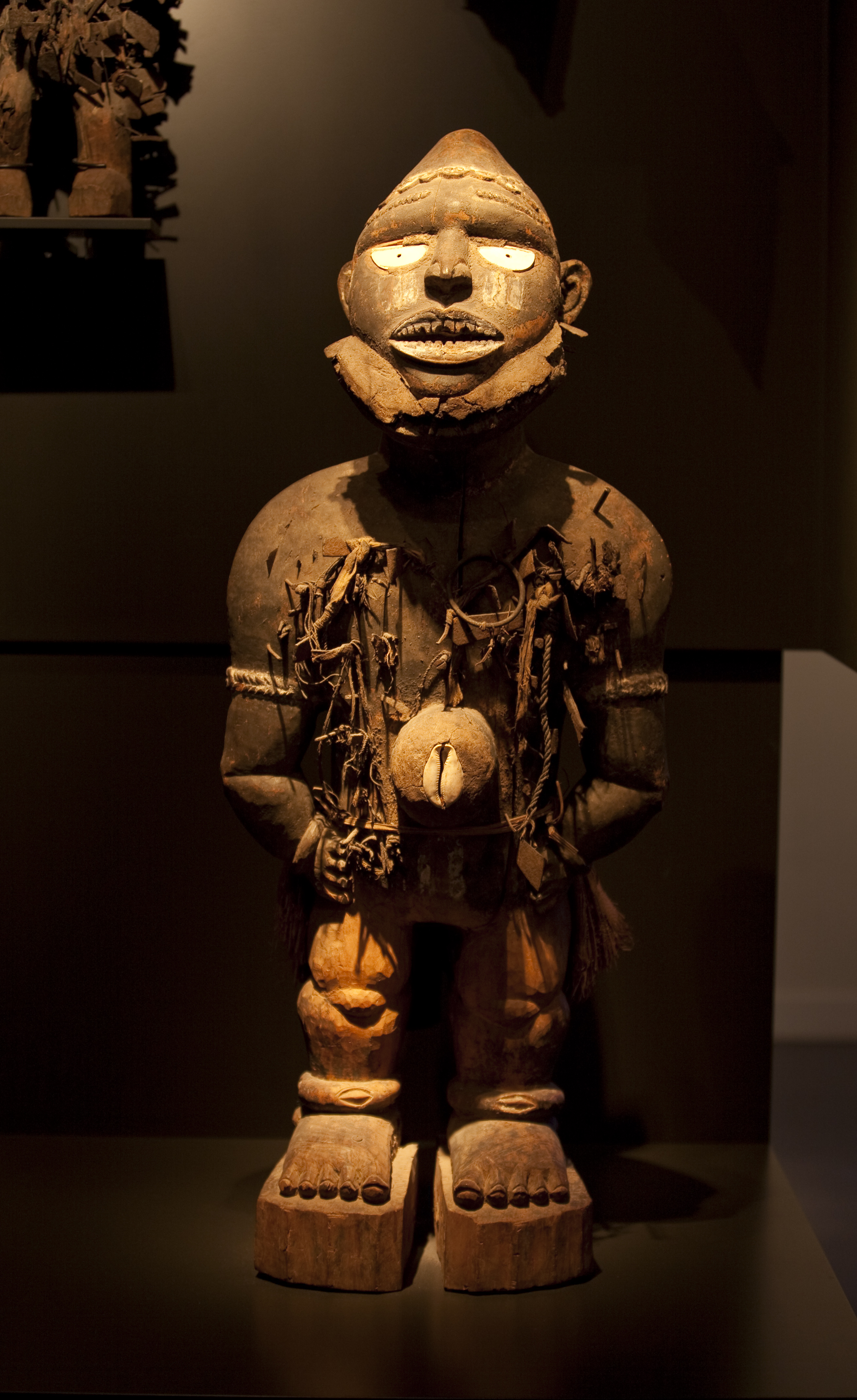
Mangaaka Power Figure (Nkisi N’Kondi), Kongo artist and nganga, Yombe group, ca. 1880-1900, Republic of the Congo or Cabinda, Angola, Chiloango River

Supernatural objects or containers that were reduced to the derogatory term, fetishes, by the Portuguese were said to be inhabited by nature spirits or deified people who embodied the extraordinary power of the spiritual world. These objects or spirits held different names by region. In the Kingdom of Loango and the lower Nzadi River to the north, they were called a nkisi (pl. bakisi, mikisi or minkisi) and considered both nature spirits and animated objects. They are composed of medicine, or bilongo, and a soul, or mooyo. They inhabit specific areas where their families and villages are located and usually have a special connection to the people living in those regions who venerate them.

In the eastern region of the Kingdom of Kongo, nature spirits were called nkita (also nquita) after a subset of the Bakongo people who referred to themselves as aquaquita, with their spiritual leaders holding the title Nganganchita. This Kimpasi group was the target of many raids by Roman Catholic priests, who received support from the King of Kongo to storm into their houses of worship, or nzo a quimpazi, and destroy any traces of idolatry along with the buildings. Belief in nkita persisted, with the spirits even providing power from the spiritual world for the Bakongo people to create sacred medicines called minkisi. In the northern region of the Kingdom of Kongo, nature spirits were referred to as kiteki, who were served by specific priest called Nganga Kiteki. Nkita were also venerated in this region by priests called kitomi. The Ambundu adopted this title from the Bakongo people of Angola.

In the Kingdom of Ndongo in Angola, nature spirits were called kilundu They existed in the same context as nkisi and nkita. However, like bisimbi, kilundu were largely believed to be spirits that were once living people, who transformed into spirits after they entered the spiritual world. This created evidence of a unifying concept of the two worlds and the four moments of life across ethnic groups in both Kongo and Angola. It also verified that even nature spirits were to go through the lifecycle. 17th Century oral tradition recounts the story of two kilundu named Navieza and Cassumba who left their homeland in the Upper Ganguela region to flee disease. While on their journey, they took shelter in "an isolated hut" in the Kisama. There they died, entered the spiritual world and were transformed into nature spirits whose purpose became to protect those who venerated them from diseases.

This person to nature spirit transformation concept was also recorded in the Kingdom of Kongo in the 20th Century. A man named Mbola is said to have died and transformed into a simbi water spirit that inhabited a stream and taught the living how to use his spiritual power for healing and to create sacred medicines, which became known as mbola.

Unlike the others, nkondi were specifically used as a means to inflict pain on those who came against the kingdom.

== Mfinda ==
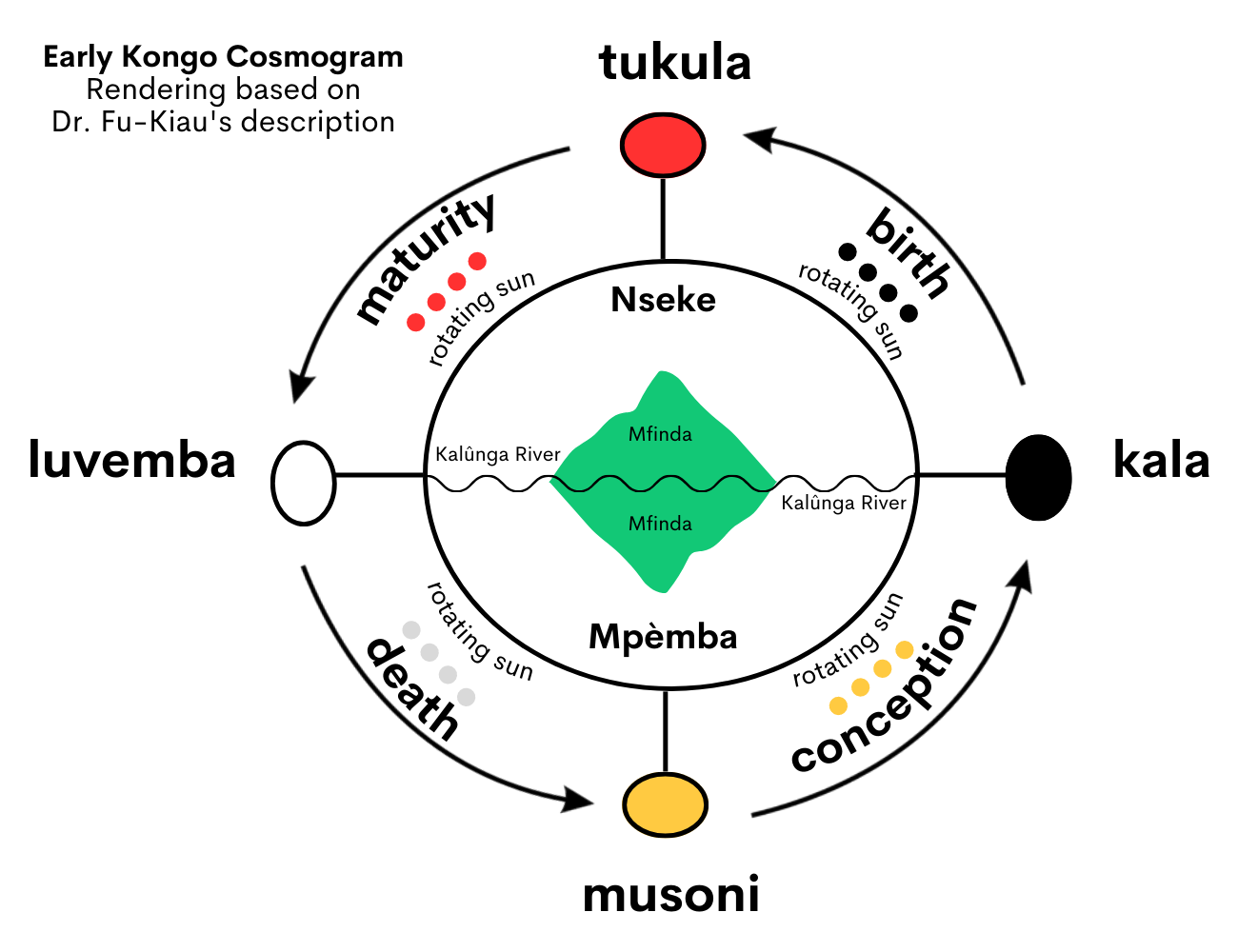
The Great Mfinda (forest)

As previously mentioned, nature is essential to Kongo spirituality. While nature spirits later became more associated with water, they were also known to dwell in the forest, or mfinda (finda in Hoodoo). The Kingdom of Kongo used the term chibila, which referred to sacred groves, where they would venerate these forest spirits. The Kongo people also believed that some ancestors inhabited the forest after death and maintained their spiritual presence in their descendants' lives. These particular ancestors were believed to have died, traveled to Mpémba, and then were reborn as bisimbi. Thus, The Mfinda existed as a meeting point between the physical world and the spiritual world, in the same manner of the kalûnga line. The living saw it as a source of physical nourishment via hunting and spiritual nourishment via contact with the ancestors. One expert on Kongo religion, Dr. Fu-Kiau, even described some precolonial Kongo cosmograms with mfinda as a bridge between the two worlds.

== Charms ==
In the 17th century, the Bakongo people expanded the concept of nkisi to include consecrated objects or charms that contained the essence of nature spirits and their spiritual powers. These minkisi (sing. nkisi) were used for protection and healing.

== Folklore ==
Kongo religion influenced the creation of several folkloric stories regarding spirits, man, and animals, to teach moral lessons. These include: How the Spider Won and Lost Nzambi's Daughter, The Turtle and the Man, The Vanishing Wife, The Antelope and the Leopard, Nzambi and Humanity, and Nzambi Mpungu's Ambassador, etc.

== The Americas ==
Due to the Atlantic slave trade, Bakongo religion was translocated to the Americas along with its enslaved practitioners. Some surviving traditions include conjure, dreaming, possession by the dead to learn wisdom from the ancestors, traditional healing and working with minkisi. The spiritual traditions and religions that have preserved Kongo traditions include Winti, Hoodoo, Palo Monte, Lumbalú, Kumina, Haitian Vodou, Candomblé Bantu, and Venezuelan Yuyu.

=== United States ===
Bakongo spiritual philosophy influenced the creation of mojo, or conjure, bags by Black Americans. Mojo is derived from the Kikongo word mooyo, which means "soul." These mojo bags were essentially small sacks where magical items were normally stored. They were also believed to contained the spiritual power of nkisi. A nganga created mojo bags for individuals, using ingredients connected to a specific simbi to invoke the spirit into the mojo bag for protection or healing.

The concept of mfinda as a spiritual space also emerged in the colonial United States through trans-Atlantic slavery and became known locally as finda. The finda then became a sacred space, where sightings of "cymbee" spirits were often recorded by Black Americans. Today, the finda is still a significant element in Hoodoo.

=== Brazil ===
In Brazil, kalunga embodies the idea that, in the realm of the living, we stand erect, but in the realm of the ancestors, everything operates in a reversed manner. Inhabitants of the netherworld (or the ancestral realm) are inverted compared to us, as viewed from our mirrored perspective. With this particular worldview, practitioners of African martial arts deliberately invert themselves physically to emulate the ancestors, and drawing strength and power from the ancestral realm.

== See also ==
- African diaspora religions
- Bantu religion
- Hoodoo
- Nyambe
- Nzambi Ampungu
