= Dondo people =

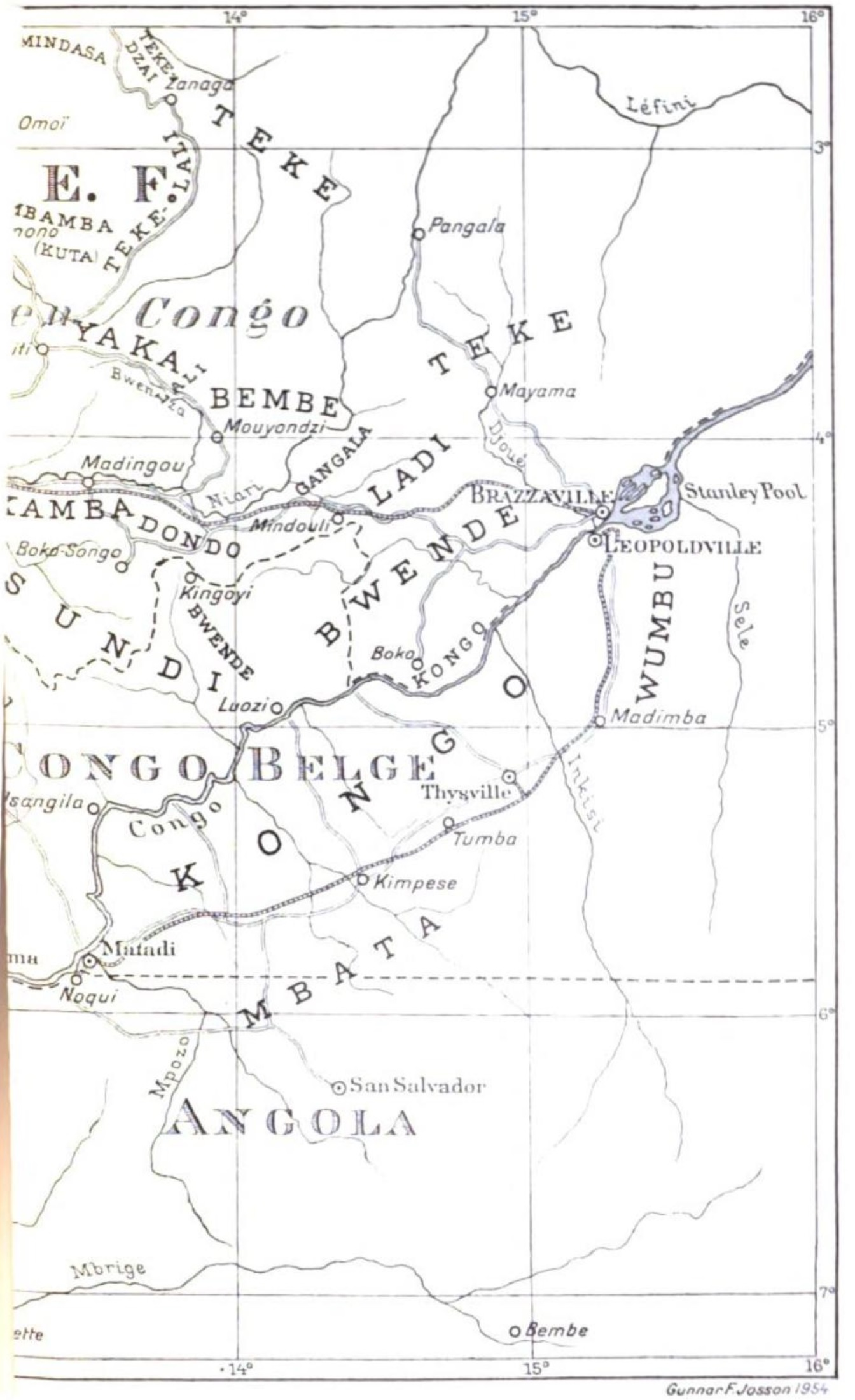
Map showing the area where the Sundi lives.

The Dondo (also Badondo) are a people of Central Africa. It is a sub-group of the Kongos. They mainly live in the south of the Republic of the Congo and in the south-west of the Democratic Republic of the Congo.
