= Kongo people =

Ethnic group in Central Africa

Bakongo
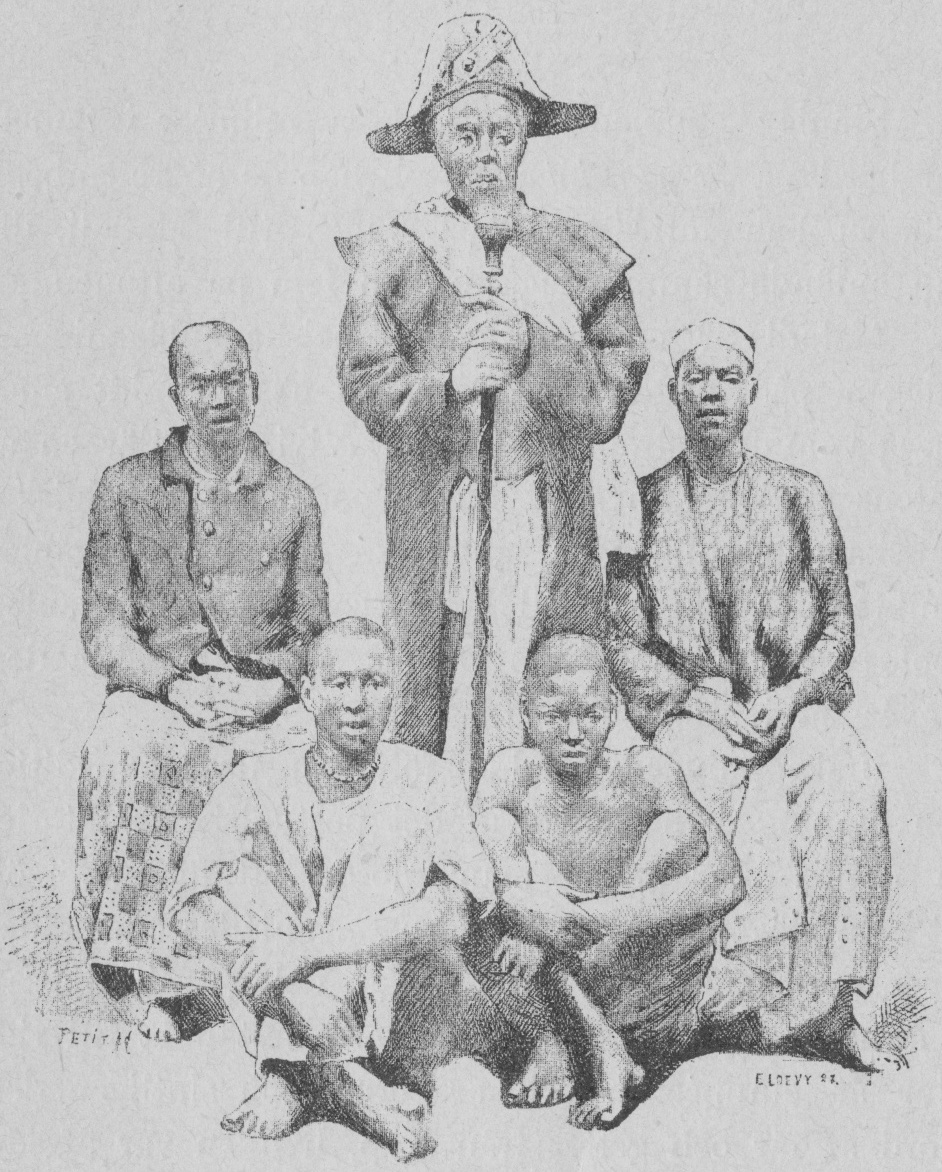
- Kongo chief with servants from Lower Congo, (present day Kongo Central),1890

Regions with significant populations
- Democratic Republic of the Congo: 16,957,000
- Angola: 5,077,000
- Republic of the Congo: 1,324,000 - 2,000,000
- Gabon: 9,000
- Belgium: Unknown
- France: Unknown
- Canada: 22,000
- Portugal: Unknown

Languages
- Native languages: Kikongo, Kituba; Lingala (minority); Second languages: French (DR Congo, Congo, Gabon); Portuguese (Angola)

Religion
- Predominantly Christianity, Kimbanguism and minority Kongo religion

Related ethnic groups
- Basuku, Bayaka, Bateke and other Bantu peoples

Kongo
- Person: Musi Kongo, Muisi Kongo, Mwisi Kongo, Mukongo, Nkongo
- People: Bisi Kongo, Esikongo, Besi Kongo, Bakongo, Akongo
- Language: Kikongo
- Country: Kongo dia Ntotila (or Ntotela), Loango, Ngoyo and Kakongo

The Kongo people (also Bakongo, singular: Mukongo or M'kongo; Kongo: Bisi Kongo, EsiKongo, singular: Musi Kongo) are a Bantu ethnic group primarily defined as the speakers of Kikongo. Subgroups include the Beembe, Bwende, Vili, Sundi, Yombe, Dondo, Lari, and others.

In the early Medieval Period, the Bakongo people were subjects of the Kingdom of Vungu. After its fall, they lived along the Atlantic coast of Central Africa in multiple kingdoms: Kongo, Loango, and Kakongo. Their highest concentrations are found south of Pointe-Noire in the Republic of the Congo, southwest of Pool Malebo and west of the Kwango River in the Democratic Republic of the Congo, north of Luanda, Angola and southwest Gabon. They are the largest ethnic group in the Republic of the Congo, and one of the major ethnic groups in the other two countries they are found in. In 1975, the Kongo population was reported as 4,040,000.

The Kongo people were among the earliest indigenous Africans to welcome Portuguese traders in 1483 CE, and began converting to Catholicism in the late 15th century. They were among the first to protest slave capture in letters to the King of Portugal in the 1510s and 1520s, then succumbed to the demands for slaves from the Portuguese through the 16th century. From the 16th to 19th centuries, the Kongo people became both victims and victimizers in the raiding, capturing, and selling of slaves to Europeans. The export trade of African slaves to the European colonial interests reached its peak in the 17th and 18th centuries. The slave raids, colonial wars and the 19th-century Scramble for Africa split the Kongo people into Portuguese, Belgian and French parts. In the early 20th century, they became one of the most active ethnic groups in the efforts to decolonize Africa, helping liberate the three nations to self-governance.

== Etymology ==
The origin of the name Kongo is uncertain, but several theories have been proposed. According to the colonial-era scholar Samuel Nelson, the term Kongo is possibly derived from a local verb for gathering or assembling. According to Alisa LaGamma, the root may be from the regional word Nkongo, which means "hunter" in the context of someone adventurous and heroic.

It may be derived from the Proto-Bantu word for hunter, similar to the IsiZulu term khonto, meaning spear, as in umkhonto we sizwe, "Spear of the Nation", the name for the military wing of the African National Congress (ANC) during its struggle against apartheid.

Douglas Harper states that the term means "mountains" in a Bantu language, which the Congo river flows down from.

The Kongo people have been referred to by various names in the colonial French, Belgian and Portuguese literature, names such as Esikongo (singular Mwisikongo), Mucicongo, Mesikongo, Madcongo and Moxicongo. Christian missionaries, particularly in the Caribbean, originally applied the term Bafiote (singular M(a)fiote) to the slaves from the Vili or Fiote coastal Kongo people, but later this term was used to refer to any "black man" in Cuba, St Lucia and other colonial era Islands ruled by one of the European colonial interests. The group is identified largely by speaking a cluster of mutually intelligible dialects rather than by large continuities in their history or even in culture. The term Congo was more widely deployed to identify Kikongo-speaking people enslaved in the Americas.

Since the early 20th century, Bakongo (singular Mkongo or Mukongo) has been increasingly used, especially in areas north of the Congo River, to refer to the Kikongo-speaking community or, more broadly, to speakers of the closely related Kongo languages. This convention is based on the Bantu languages, to which the Kongo language belongs. The prefixes "mu-" and "ba-" refer to people, singular and plural respectively.

== History ==
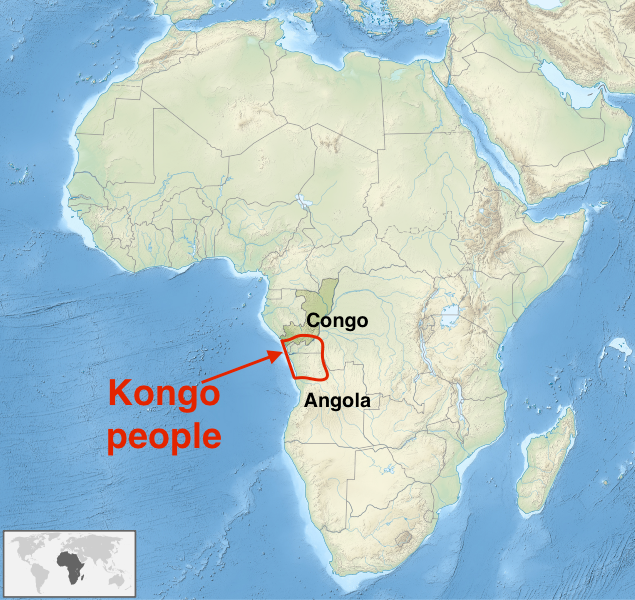
Distribution of the Kongo people in Africa (approx)

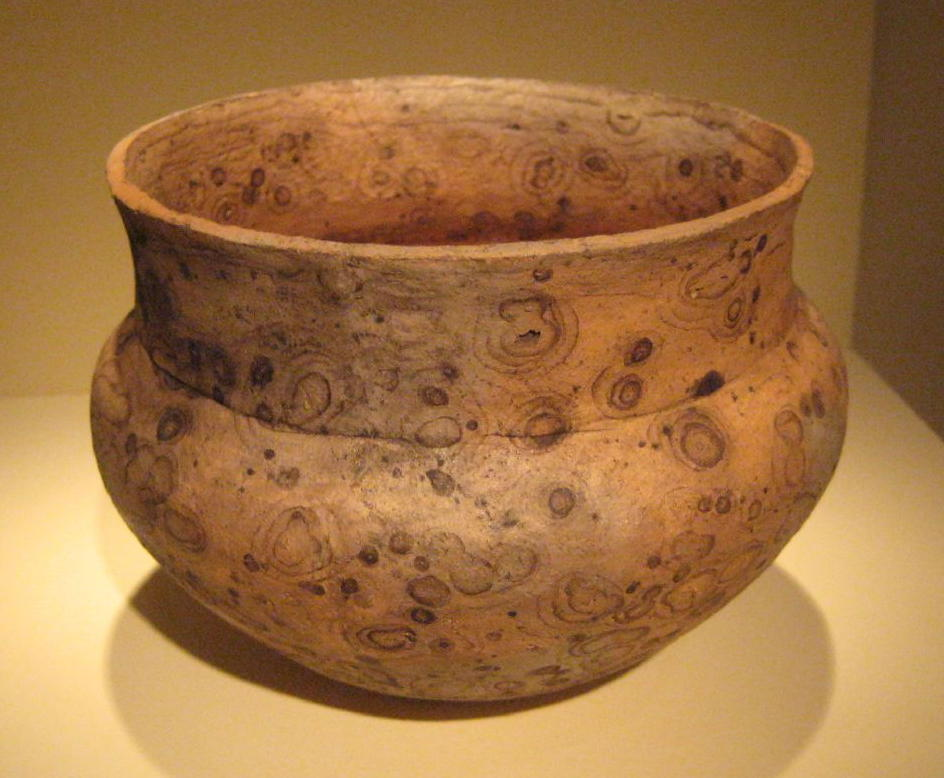
Kongo bowl in the National Museum of African Art, Washington, DC

The ancient history of the Kongo people has been difficult to ascertain. The region is close to East Africa, considered to be a key to the prehistoric human migrations. This geographical proximity, states Jan Vansina, suggests that the Congo River region, home of the Kongo people, was populated thousands of years ago. Ancient archeological evidence linked to Kongo people has not been found, and glottochronology – or the estimation of ethnic group chronologies based on language evolution – has been applied to the Kongo. Based on this, it is likely the Kongo language and Gabon-Congo language split about 950 BCE.

The earliest archeological evidence is from Tchissanga (now part of modern Republic of the Congo), a site dated to about 600 BCE. However, the site does not prove which ethnic group was resident at that time. The Kongo people had settled into the area well before the fifth century CE, begun a society that utilized the diverse and rich resources of region and developed farming methods. According to James Denbow, social complexity had probably been achieved by the second century CE.

According to Vansina small kingdoms and Kongo principalities appeared in the current region by the 1200 CE, but documented history of this period of Kongo people if it existed has not survived into the modern era. Detailed and copious description about the Kongo people who lived next to the Atlantic ports of the region, as a sophisticated culture, language and infrastructure, appear in the 15th century, written by the Portuguese explorers. Later anthropological work on the Kongo of the region come from the colonial era writers, particularly the French and Belgians (Loango, Vungu, and the Niari Valley), but this too is limited and does not exhaustively cover all of the Kongo people. The evidence suggests, states Vansina, that the Kongo people were advanced in their culture and socio-political systems with multiple kingdoms well before the arrival of first Portuguese ships in the late 15th century.

=== The Kingdom of Kongo ===
A map of Angola showing majority ethnic groups. The Bakongo area is in the far Northwest and marked in the color Cream.

Kongo oral tradition suggests that the Kongo people were originally citizens of a federation of states called the Seven Kingdoms of Kongo dia Nlaza and a separate kingdom called Vungu. These kingdoms and their peoples were ultimately absorbed into the Kingdom of Kongo, which was founded in the 14th century. The kingdom was modeled not on hereditary succession as was common in Europe, but based on an election by the court nobles from the Kongo people. This required the king to win his legitimacy by a process of recognizing his peers, consensus building as well as regalia and religious ritualism. The kingdom had many trading centers both near rivers and inland, distributed across hundreds of kilometers and Mbanza Kongo – its capital that was about 200 kilometers inland from the Atlantic coast.

The Portuguese arrived on the Central African coast north of the Congo River, several times between 1472 and 1483 searching for a sea route to India, but they failed to find any ports or trading opportunities. In 1483, south of the Congo river they found the Kongo people and the Kingdom of Kongo, which had a centralized government, a currency called nzimbu, and markets, ready for trading relations. The Portuguese found well developed transport infrastructure inlands from the Kongo people's Atlantic port settlement. They also found exchange of goods easy and the Kongo people open to ideas. The Kongo king at that time, named Nzinga a Nkuwu allegedly willingly accepted Christianity, and at his baptism in 1491 changed his name to João I, a Portuguese name. Around the 1450s, a prophet, Ne Buela Muanda, predicted the arrival of the Portuguese and the spiritual and physical enslavement of many Bakongo.

The trade between Kongo people and Portuguese people thereafter accelerated through 1500. The kingdom of Kongo appeared to become receptive of the new traders, allowed them to settle an uninhabited nearby island called São Tomé, and sent Bakongo nobles to visit the royal court in Portugal. Other than the king himself, much of the Kongo people's nobility welcomed the cultural exchange, the Christian missionaries converted them to the Catholic faith, they assumed Portuguese court manners, and by early 16th-century Kongo became a Portugal-affiliated Christian kingdom.

=== Slavery in the Kingdom of Kongo ===
Initially, ivory and copper were the main sources of trades between the Bakongo and Portuguese. After 1500, the Portuguese had little demand for the minerals and sought enslaved people for their sugarcane plantations in São Tomé. The Portuguese began purchasing these captive individuals, and then began kidnapping people from the Kongo society, soon after. In 1514, they provoked military campaigns in nearby African villages to take enslaved locals for labor. This violated the terms of the agreement between Afonso I, the ManiKongo (King of Kongo), and the Portuguese crown, which prompted the ManiKongo to write letters to the king of Portugal and threaten to end all trade with the western nation if he did not adhere to the original terms.

Portuguese enslavers met traders at planned locations outside of the Kingdom of Kongo, such as the Malebo Pool, and offered luxury goods in exchange for kidnapped and captured people, which included Kongos. Historian Jan Vansina believes that this created an incentive for border conflicts and slave caravan routes, from other ethnic groups and different parts of Africa, in which the Kongo people and traders participated. The slave raids and volume of trade in enslaved human beings increased, and by the 1560s, over 7,000 people per year were captured and exported by Portuguese traders to the Americas as slaves. The Kongo people and neighboring ethnic groups retaliated with attacks, such as the Jaga invasion of 1568. The Jaga people pillaged the Kongo lands, burning Portuguese churches and attacking the capitol. They nearly ended the Kingdom of Kongo.

The Kongo people also created songs to warn themselves of the arrival of the Portuguese, one of the famous songs is " Malele " (Translation: "Tragedy", song present among the 17 Kongo songs sung by the Massembo family of Guadeloupe during the Grap a Kongo). The Portuguese brought in military and arms to support the Kingdom of Kongo, and after years of fighting, they jointly defeated the attack. This war unexpectedly led to a flood of captives who had challenged the Kongo nobility and traders, and the coastal ports were flooded with "war captives turned slaves". The other effect of this violence over many years was making the Kongo king heavily dependent on the Portuguese protection, along with the dehumanization of the African people, including the rebelling Kongo people, as cannibalistic pagan barbarians from "Jaga kingdom". This caricature of the African people and their dehumanisation was vociferous and well-published by the slave traders, the missionaries and the colonial-era Portuguese historians, which helped morally justify the mass trading of slaves.

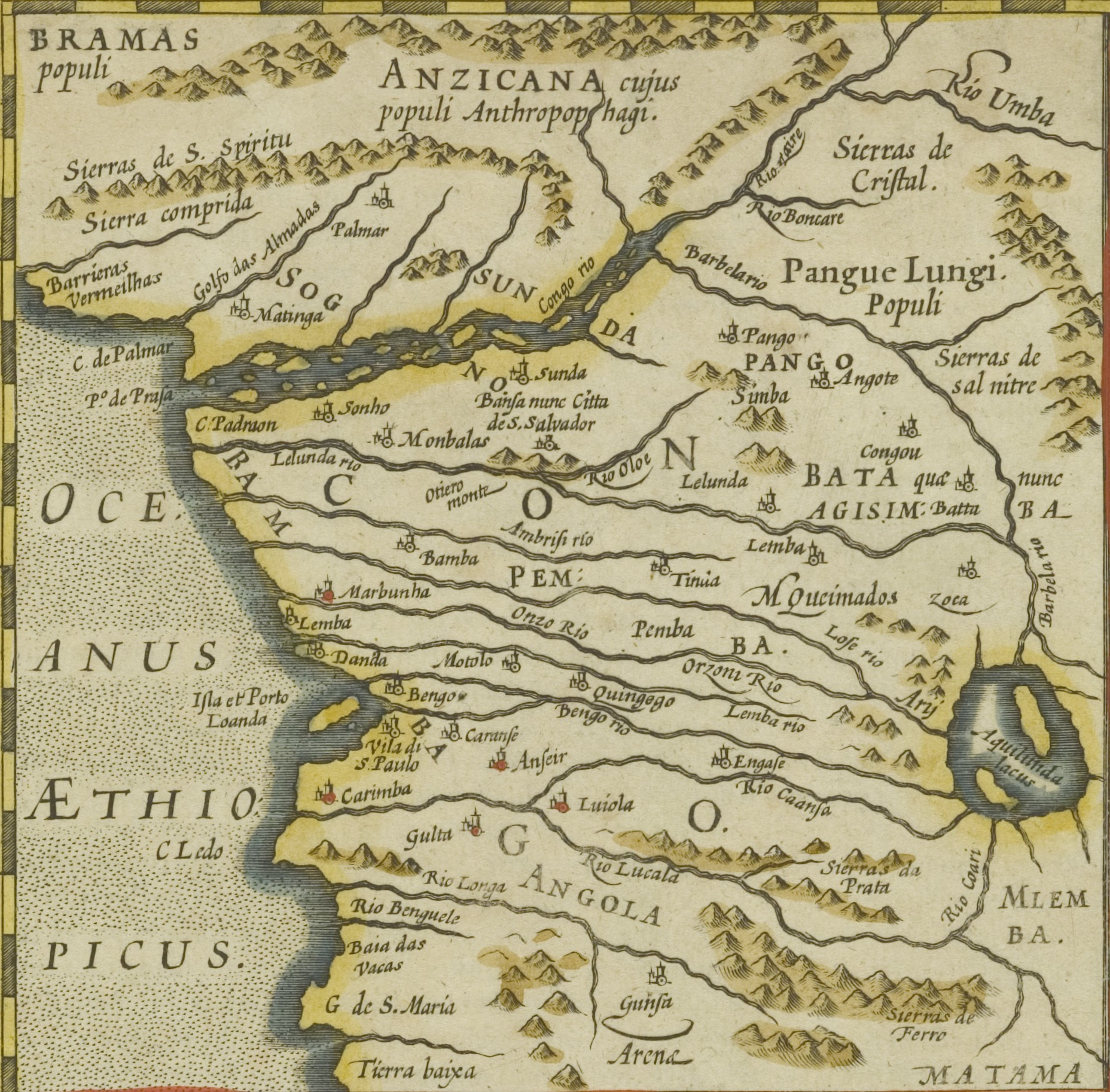
A 1595 map of Congo, printed in 1623. The map emphasizes the rivers and Portuguese churches. It marks the capital of Kongo people as Citta de São Salvador.

Modern scholars such as Estevam Thompson have shown that there is much confusion between the "original" Jagas, who left the land of Yaka on the eastern bank of the Kwango River and invaded Mbata and mbanza Kongo, and other later references to "Jaga warriors" roaming the interior of West Central Africa who were, indeed, different Mbangala groups. There are other scholars, such as Joseph Miller, that believed this 16th and 17th centuries' one-sided dehumanization of the African people was a fabrication and myth created by the missionaries and slave trading Portuguese to hide their abusive activities and intentions.

The Jaga invasion caused an economic crisis in Kongo, resulting in people selling members of their own families, akin to the practice of debt slavery in ancient Rome. This weakened the Kingdom of Kongo from internal revolts and violence, caused by the raiding and capturing of slaves, for the Portuguese were called upon for military aid in exchange for a port at Luanda (modern-day Angola). Thus, after the defeat of the Jagas, the port city of Luanda was established in 1575, in cooperation with a Kongo noble family to facilitate their military presence, African operations and the slave trade thereof.

From the 1570s, European traders began to arrive in large numbers, and the slave trade through the Kongo people's territory experienced a dramatic increase. After defeating the Jagas, Manikongo Alvaro I sold many of them as slaves to the Portuguese. However, as Kongo's military expansion declined in the early 17th century, its source of foreign slaves also decreased. Consequently, freeborn Kongolese enslaved in civil conflicts, rebellions, and as judicial punishments, became a new source of Kongo's slave export. This marked the beginning of the major expatriation of Bakongo people into the Atlantic Slave Trade. Actions such as disrespecting nobles and stealing from gardens could result in a freeborn Bakongo being enslaved. Furthermore, if several villagers were found guilty of a crime, the whole village was sometimes enslaved. Rebellions like the Soyo rebellion of 1641, in the reign of Manikongo Garcia II, caused the export of freeborn Kongolese.

Over time, the Kongo-Portuguese relationship deteriorated, leading to three waves of wars between Kongo and Portuguese Angola. This caused many Kongo people to be enslaved. After a second truce, the Kingdom of Kongo and its people ended their cooperation with Portugal in the 1660s and, in 1646, a third Kongo-Portuguese war erupted. This escalated in the battle of Mbwila, in 1665, where the Manikongo, Antonio I, was killed. About five thousand of the Kongo army were killed, and many of the survivors were sold as slaves in the Americas, particularly Brazil. Bakongo people enslaved in the aftermath of this battle include Princess Alquantune, her sons Ganga Zumba and Ganga Zona, her daughter Sabina, four governors, various court officials, 95 workers, and 400 other aristocrats.

Following the battle of Mbwila, all direct male heirs to the throne were eradicated. Antonio's only surviving son, Francisco de Menezes Nkanka a Makaya, was captured by the Portuguese and imprisoned at Luanda.

=== The Atlantic slave trade ===
Many Bakongo people were subsequently enslaved in civil wars that plagued the Kingdom throughout the 17th, 18th, and 19th centuries. These Kongo slaves were often captured as prisoners of war in civil wars, caused by succession disputes. One example is the Kongo Civil War of 1665 - 1709. These captives were generally exported to North America and the Caribbean, through the port of Loango, via the Dutch & English. Whereas, Luanda served as a Portuguese slave port, supplying slaves to Brazil.

Kongo people convicted of crimes such as theft, treason, rebellion, desertion, seditious libels, witchcraft, and fornication, were condemned to perpetual slavery. Thus, by the mid-1600s, such convicts could be sold to Europeans.

As a result of the highly centralised political structure of the Kingdom of Kongo, some of the Bakongo slaves brought to the Americas were Catholics, Portuguese speakers, and trained soldiers.

The Bakongo were expert agriculturalists, growing multiple crops and domesticating livestock. They knew fishing, hunting, bushcraft skills, as well as the slash-and-burn technique. They were also experienced miners and ironworkers, allowing them to extract and process metals to make swords for the Kongo military. These renowned agricultural skills made the Bakongo one of the most preferred Central African ethnic groups by European slave traders during this period.

Bakongo girl

In the Americas, Bakongo slaves were identified as Kikongo speakers, but were given the general classification of Congos, like other enslaved ethnic groups from their region.

Bakongo people were dispersed to the following regions in the Americas: Brazil, Cuba, Colombia, Dominican Republic, Haiti, Guadeloupe, Venezuela, Jamaica, Trinidad & Tobago, Puerto Rico, Belize, Grenada, Barbados, as well as Colonial America and the United States (e.g. Louisiana, South Carolina, Georgia, New York, and Virginia).

Kongo religion and culture were transported to the New World with its enslaved practitioners, evolving alongside its enslaved practitioners. Traditional Kongo religion has survived in the Americas in the form of Hoodoo in the southern United States, Palo Mayombe in Cuba, Candomble Bantu in Brazil, Kumina in Jamaica, Haitian Voodoo in Haiti, Dominican Santeria, and Birongo in Venezuela.

Examples of Bakongo religious elements in these Afro-diaspora spiritualities are simbi spirits (water deities), nkisi spirits (deities which inhabit objects), ngangas (spiritual healers), mfindas, and mojo bags. The Kongo Cosmogram, a traditional symbol of Kongo religion, has been found in numerous slave lodges in the U.S. This includes the First African Baptist Church, an African-American church on the Eastern Shore of Virginia, Kings County in Brooklyn-New York, the Richmond Hill Plantation in Georgia, the Frogmore Plantation in South Carolina, a plantation in Texas, and the Magnolia Plantation in Louisiana. It has also been incorporated into the Afro-Cuban Palo religion and the African-American Hoodoo tradition.

The Kikongo language is the native language of the Bakongo people. Kikongo words have been partially preserved in Afro-diaspora languages, such as Habla Congo, Palenquero, Saramaccan, Haitian Creole, Jamaican Patois, the Gullah language, and Afro-Seminole Creole spoken by Black Seminoles.

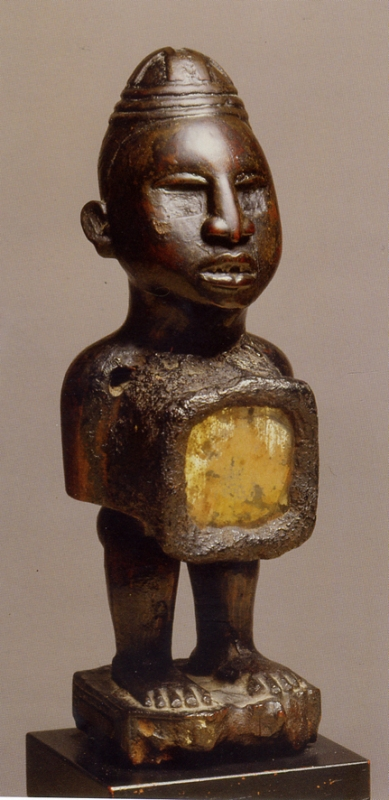
A Kongo artwork

With the abolition of the Atlantic Slave Trade in 1807, civil conflict caused the Bakongo people to be illegally trafficked across the Atlantic, despite the British Slave Trade Act of 1807. Many were brought to Cuba and Brazil. Others were rerouted to Freetown, in British Sierra Leone, after being intercepted and liberated by the West African Squadron. Some were rerouted to Jamaica and Trinidad as indentured labourers.

Most of the 409 survivors of the Wanderer, a slave ship that landed in Jekyll Island, Georgia, in 1858, were Bakongo.

=== Smaller kingdoms ===
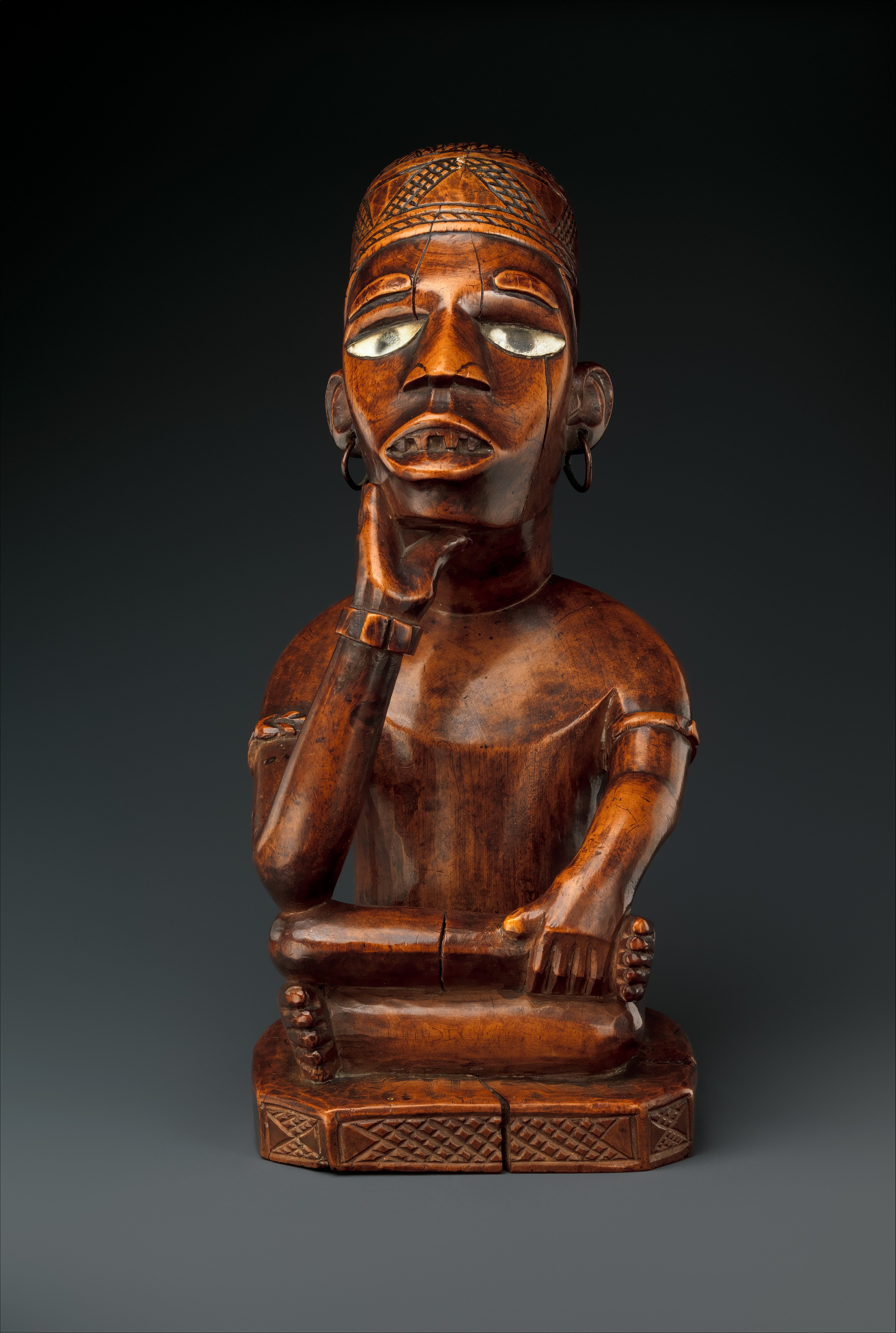
Seated Male Figure. Bakongo people, Kakongo group. Mid to late 19th Century. Angola or Democratic Republic of the Congo.

The 1665 Kongo-Portuguese war and the killing of the hereditary king by the Portuguese soldiers led to a political vacuum. The Kongo kingdom disintegrated into smaller kingdoms, each controlled by nobles considered friendly by the Portuguese. One of these kingdoms was the kingdom of Loango. Loango was in the northern part, above the Congo River, a region which long before the war was already an established community of the Kongo people. New kingdoms came into existence in this period, from the disintegrated parts in the southeast and the northeast of the old Kongo kingdom. The old capital of the Kongo people called São Salvador was burnt down and was in ruins and abandoned in 1678. The fragmented new kingdoms of the Kongo people disputed each other's boundaries and rights, as well as those of other non-Kongo ethnic groups bordering them, leading to steady wars and mutual raids.

The wars between the small kingdoms created a steady supply of captives that fed the Portuguese demand for slaves and the small kingdoms' need for government income to finance the wars. In the 1700s, a baptized teenage Kongo woman named Dona Beatriz Kimpa Vita claimed to be possessed by Saint Anthony of Padua and that she had been visiting heaven to speak with God. She started preaching that Mary and Jesus were not born in Nazareth but in Africa among the Kongo people. She created a movement among the Kongo people which historians call Kongo Antonianism.

Dona Beatriz questioned the wars devastating the Kongo people and asked all Kongo people to end the wars that fed the trading in humans and unite under one king. (Note: Quote: "Dona Beatriz had sought to end the wars that fed this trade in humans....") She attracted a following of thousands of Kongo people into the ruins of their old capital. She was declared a false saint by the Portuguese-appointed Kongo king Pedro IV, with the support of Portuguese Catholic missionaries and Italian Capuchin monks then resident in Kongo lands. On 2 July 1706, the 22-year-old Dona Beatriz was arrested and burned at the stake, on charges of being a witch and a heretic. In the preceding years, some of her followers were captured and sold into slavery to Cuba, Brazil, and Haiti.

=== Colonial era ===
After the death of Dona Beatriz in 1706 and another three years of wars with the help of the Portuguese, Pedro IV was able to get back much of the old Kongo kingdom. The conflicts continued through the 18th century, however, and the demand for and the caravan of Kongo and non-Kongo people as captured slaves kept rising, headed to the Atlantic ports. Although, in Portuguese documents, all of Kongo people were technically under one ruler, they were no longer governed that way by the mid-18th century. The Kongo people were now divided into regions, each headed by a noble family. Christianity was growing again with new chapels built, services regularly held, missions of different Christian sects expanding, and church rituals a part of the royal succession. There were succession crises, ensuing conflicts when a local royal Kongo ruler died and occasional coups such as that of Andre II by Henrique III, typically settled with Portuguese intervention, and these continued through the mid-19th century. After Henrique III died in 1857, competitive claims to the throne were raised by his relatives. One of them, Pedro Elelo, gained the trust of Portuguese military against Alvero XIII, by agreeing to be vassal of the colonial Portugal. This effectively ended whatever sovereignty had previously been recognized and the Kongo people became a part of colonial Portugal.

Slave shipment between 1501 and 1867, by region (Note: This slave trade volume excludes the slave trade by Swahili-Arabs in East Africa and North African ethnic groups to the Middle East and elsewhere. The exports and imports do not match, because of the large number of deaths en route and violent retaliation by captured people on the ships involved in the slave trade.)
Region	Total embarked	Total disembarked
West central Africa	5.69 million	
Bight of Biafra	1.6 million	
Bight of Benin	2.00 million	
Gold Coast	1.21 million	
Windward Coast	0.34 million	
Sierra Leone	0.39 million	
Senegambia	0.76 million	
Mozambique	0.54 million	
Brazil (South America)		4.7 million
Rest of South America		0.9 million
Caribbean		4.1 million
North America		0.4 million
Europe		0.01 million

In concert with the growing import of Christian missionaries and luxury goods, the slave capture and exports through the Kongo lands grew. With over 5.6 million human beings kidnapped in Central Africa, then sold and shipped as slaves through the lands of the Kongo people, they witnessed the largest exports of slaves from Africa into the Americas by 1867. According to Jan Vansina, the "whole of Angola's economy and its institutions of governance were based on the slave trade" in 18th and 19th century, until the slave trade was forcibly brought to an end in the 1840s. This ban on lucrative trade of slaves through the lands of Kongo people was bitterly opposed by both the Portuguese and Luso-Africans (part Portuguese, part African), states Vansina. The slave trade was replaced with ivory trade in the 1850s, where the old caravan owners and routes replaced hunting human beings with hunting elephants for their tusks with the help of non-Kongo ethnic groups such as the Chokwe people, which were then exported with the labor of Kongo people.

Swedish missionaries entered the area in the 1880s and 1890, converting the northeast section of Kongo to Protestantism in the early twentieth century. The Swedish missionaries, notably Karl Laman, encouraged the local people to write their history and customs in notebooks, which then became the source for Laman's famous and widely cited ethnography and their dialect became well established thanks to Laman's dictionary of Kikongo.

The fragmented Kongo people in the 19th century were annexed by three European colonial empires, during the Scramble for Africa and Berlin Conference, the northernmost parts went to France (now the Republic of Congo and Gabon), the middle part along river Congo along with the large inland region of Africa went to Belgium (now the Democratic Republic of Congo) and the southern parts (now Angola) remained with Portugal. The Kongo people in all three colonies (Angola, the Republic of Congo and the Democratic Republic of Congo) became one of the most active ethnic groups in the efforts to decolonize Africa, and worked with other ethnic groups in Central Africa to help liberate the three nations to self governance. The French and Belgium regions became independent in 1960. Angolan independence came in 1975.

== Language and demographics ==
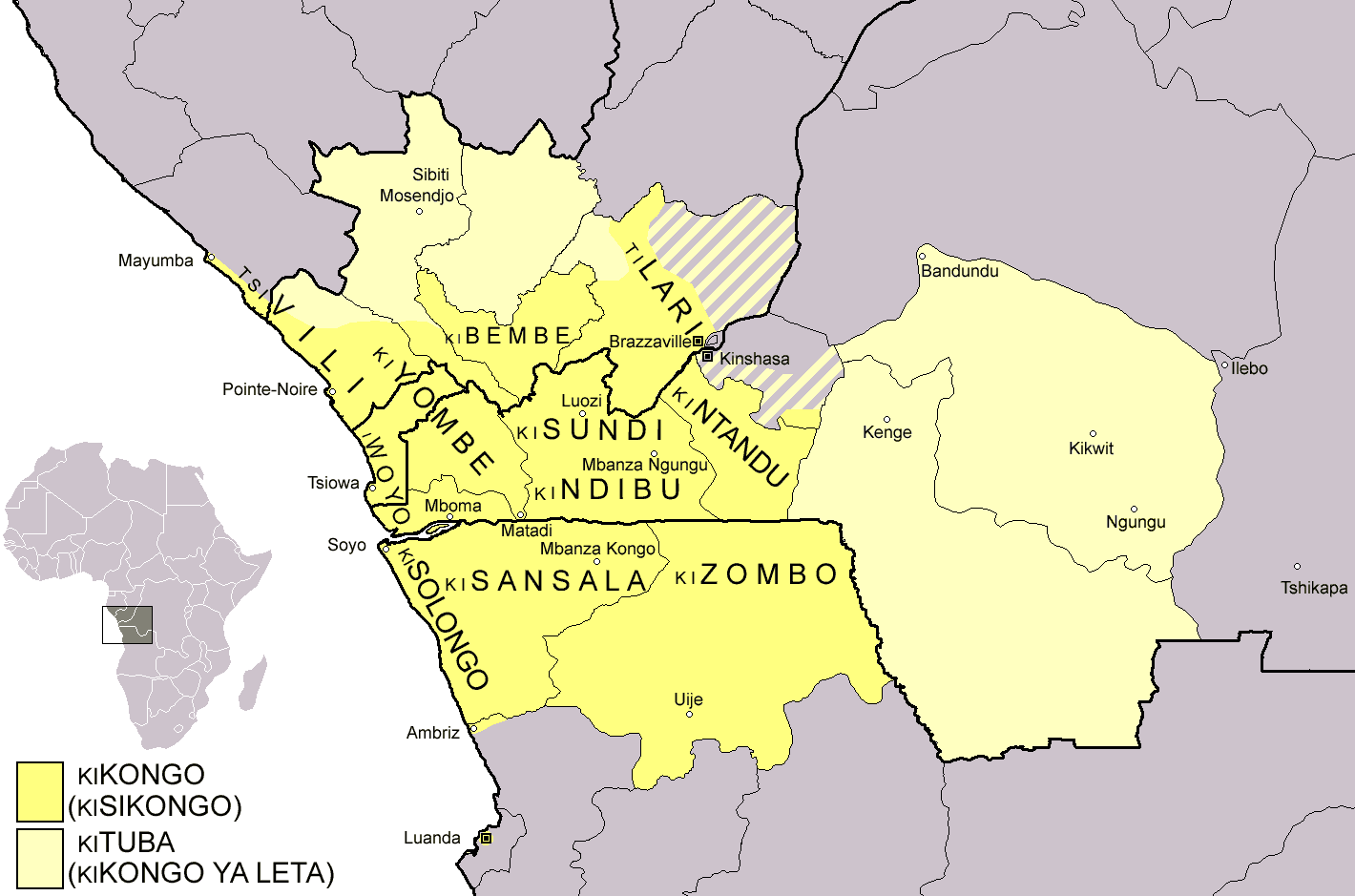
Map of the area where Kongo and Kituba as the lingua franca are spoken. NB: Kisikongo (also called Kisansala by some authors) is the Kikongo spoken in Mbanza Kongo. Kisikongo is not the protolanguage of the Kongo language cluster.

The language of the Kongo people is called Kikongo (Guthrie: Bantu Zone H.10). It is a macrolanguage and consists of Beembe, Doondo, Koongo, Laari, Kongo-San-Salvador, Kunyi, Vili and Yombe sub-languages.

The Kongo language is divided into many dialects which are sufficiently diverse that people from distant dialects, such as speakers of Kivili dialect (on the northern coast) and speakers of Kisansolo (the central dialect) would have trouble understanding each other.

In Angola, there are a few who did not learn to speak Kikongo because Portuguese rules of assimilation during the colonial period was directed against learning native languages, though most Bakongo held on to the language. Most Angolan Kongo also speak Portuguese and those near the border of the Democratic Republic of Congo also speak French. In the Democratic Republic of the Congo most also speak French and others speak either Lingala, a common lingua franca in Western Congo, or Kikongo ya Leta (generally known as Kituba particularly in the Republic of the Congo), a creole form of Kikongo spoken widely in the Republic of the Congo and in the Democratic Republic of the Congo.

== Religion ==
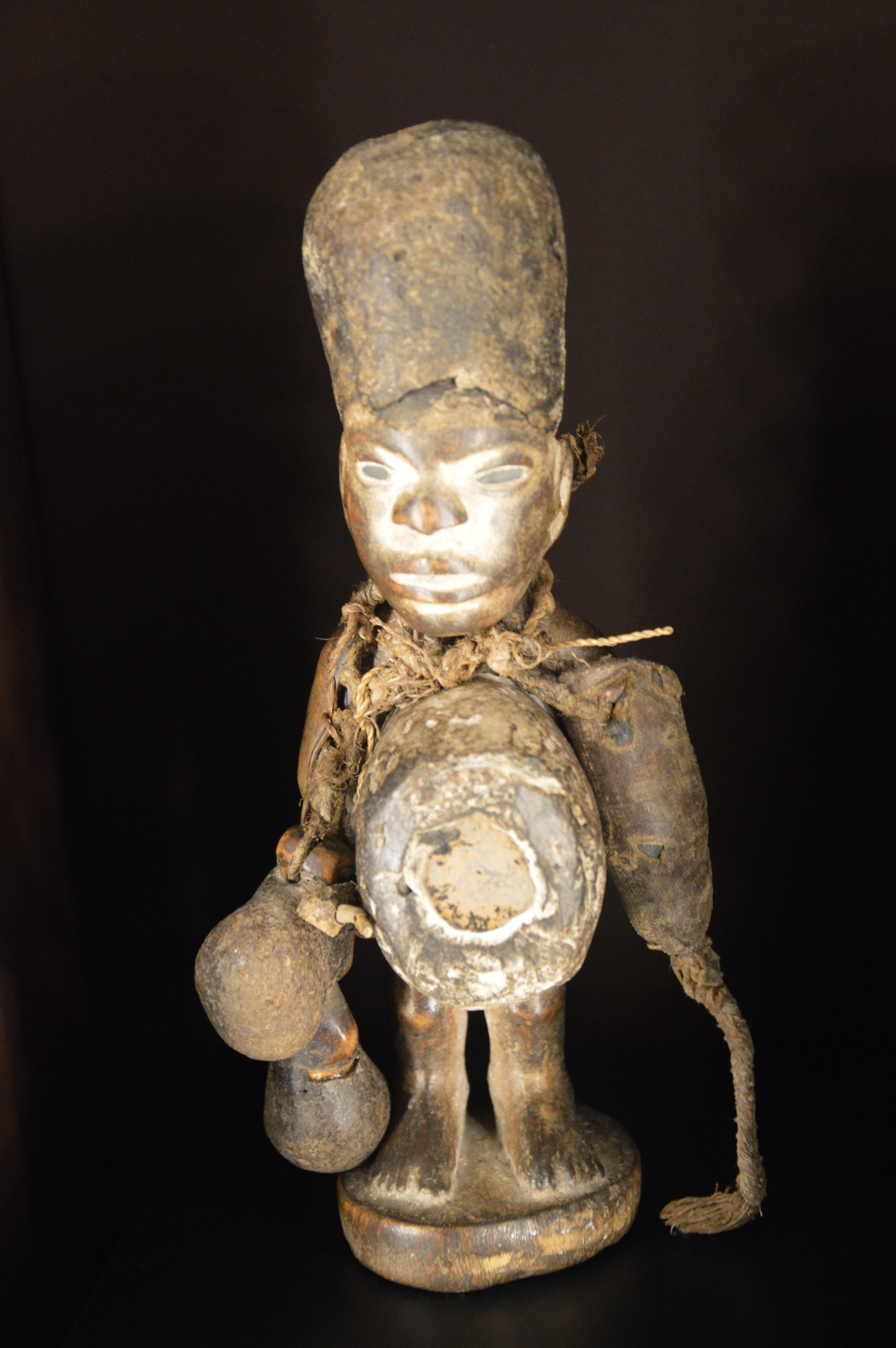
Nkisi nkondi of the Kongo people; Nkisi means holy.

The religious history of the Kongo is complex, particularly after the ruling class of the Kingdom of Kongo accepted Christianity at the start of the 16th century. According to historian John K. Thornton, "Central Africans have probably never agreed among themselves as to what their cosmology is in detail, a product of what I called the process of continuous revelation and precarious priesthood." The Kongo people had diverse views, with traditional religious ideas best developed in the small northern Kikongo-speaking area, and this region neither converted to Christianity nor participated in slave trade until the 19th century. There is abundant description about Kongo religious concepts in the Catholic missionary and colonial era records, but states Thornton, these are written with a hostile bias and their reliability is problematic.

The Kongo people believed in the Supreme god known as Nzambi, his female counterpart called Nzambici, and a host of nature spirits that were referred to as simbi, nkisi, nkita and kilundu spirits. In an attempt to convince Kongo people to convert to Catholicism, Portuguese missionaries often stressed that Nzambi was the Christian God. Similarly, the early missionaries used words in the Kongo language to integrate Christian concepts, such as using the words nkisi to mean "holy." Thus, the word "church" to Kongo people became nzo a nkisi, which meant "another shrine," and the Bible was mukanda nkisi, which meant "a consecrated charm." Kongo people maintained both churches and shrines, which they called Kiteki. Their smaller shrines were dedicated to the smaller deities, even after they had converted to Christianity. These deities were guardians of water bodies, crop lands and high places to the Kongo people, and they were very prevalent both in capital towns of the Christian ruling classes, as well as in the villages.

The later Portuguese missionaries and Capuchin monks upon their arrival in Kongo were baffled by these practices in the late 17th century (nearly 150 years after the acceptance of Christianity as the state religion in the Kingdom of Kongo). Some threatened to burn or destroy the shrines. However, the Kongo people credited these shrines for abundance and defended them. The Kongo people's conversion was based on different assumptions and premises about what Christianity was, and syncretic ideas continued for centuries.

After enslaved Bakongo people were forcibly transported to the Americas, their beliefs became the cornerstone of emerging religions and spiritual traditions that helped them understand the new world around them. This includes Hoodoo in the United States, Winti in Suriname, Palo in Cuba, Vodou in Haiti, Lumbalú in Columbia, Kumina in Jamaica, Candomblé Bantu in Brazil, and Yuyu in Venezuela.

=== Creation and cosmology ===
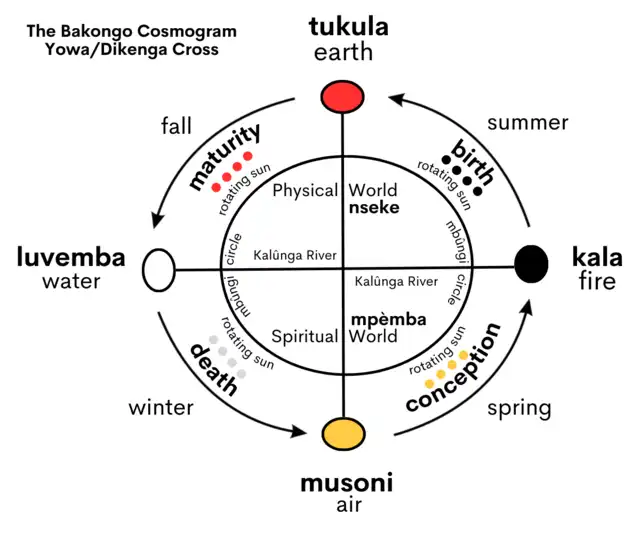
The Kongo Cosmogram, also known as the Dikenga or Yowa Cross.

The Bakongo people believe that "The world in its beginning was empty; it was an mbûngi, an empty thing, a cavity, without visible life." Mbûngi (also called mwasi and mpampa) was symbolized as a circle of emptiness. The creator god Nzambi, along with his female counterpart called Nzambici, is believed to have created a spark of fire, called kalûnga, and summoned it inside of mbûngi. Kalûnga grew and became a great force of energy inside of mbûngi, creating a mass of fusion. When the mass grew too hot, the heated force caused the mass to break apart and hurl projectiles outside of mbûngi. Those projectiles became individual masses that scattered about, and when the fires cooled, planets were created. The Bakongo believe this was the process Nzambi used to create the universe, with the Sun, stars, planets, etc. The Bakongo referred to this process as luku lwalamba Nzambi, or "God created and cooked dough." Because of this, kalûnga is seen as the origin of life, or moyo wawo mu nza, and the Bakongo people believe that life requires constant change and perpetual motion. Thus, Nzambi is also referred to as Kalûnga, the God of change. Similarities between the Bakongo belief of Kalûnga and the Big Bang Theory have been studied. Unlike many other traditional African spiritualities, the creation beliefs of the Bakongo is compatible with creatio ex nihilio.

According to Molefi Kete Asante, "Another important characteristic of Bakongo cosmology is the sun and its movements. The rising, peaking, setting, and absence of the sun provide the essential pattern for Bakongo religious culture. These "four moments of the sun" equate with the four stages of life: conception, birth, maturity, and death. For the Bakongo, everything transitions through these stages: planets, plants, animals, people, societies, and even ideas. This vital cycle is depicted in a symbol known as the Kongo Cosmogram (also called the Dikenga or Yowa Cross), which contains a circle with a cross inside." In this depiction, the upper hemisphere represents the physical world, while the lower hemisphere represents the spiritual worls. A horizontal line represents the Kalinga, which divides both realm. Thus, bodies of water are viewed as boundaries between both realms in Kongo religion. The point where both lines meet is the most powerful point, and anyone who stands there can channel immense spiritual energy.

The Kongo Cosmogram was introduced to the Americas by Bakongo people enslaved in the Atlantic Slave Trade, and it became a vital component of the various Afro-diaspora religions that sprung from Kongo religion.

== Society and culture ==
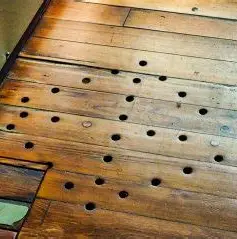
The Kongo cosmogram was chiseled into the wooden floor of the historic First African Baptist Church in Savannah, GA.

The large Bakongo society features a diversity of occupations. Some are farmers who grow staples and cash crops. Among the staples are cassava, bananas, maize, taro and sweet potatoes. Other crops include peanuts (groundnuts) and beans. The cash crops were introduced by the colonial rulers, and these include coffee and cacao for the chocolate industry. Palm oil is another export commodity, while the traditional urena is a famine food. Some Kongo people fish and hunt, but most work in factories and trade in towns.

The Kongo people have traditionally recognized their descent from their mother (matrilineality), and this lineage links them into kinship groups. They are culturally organized as ones who cherish their independence, so much so that neighboring Kongo people's villages avoid being dependent on each other. There is a strong undercurrent of messianic tradition among the Bakongo, which has led to several politico-religious movements in the 20th century. This may be linked to the premises of dualistic cosmology in Bakongo tradition, where two worlds exist, one visible and lived, another invisible and full of powerful spirits. The belief that there is an interaction and reciprocal exchange between these, to Bakongo, means the world of spirits can possess the world of flesh.

Article about Kongo clans

Article about Vili clans

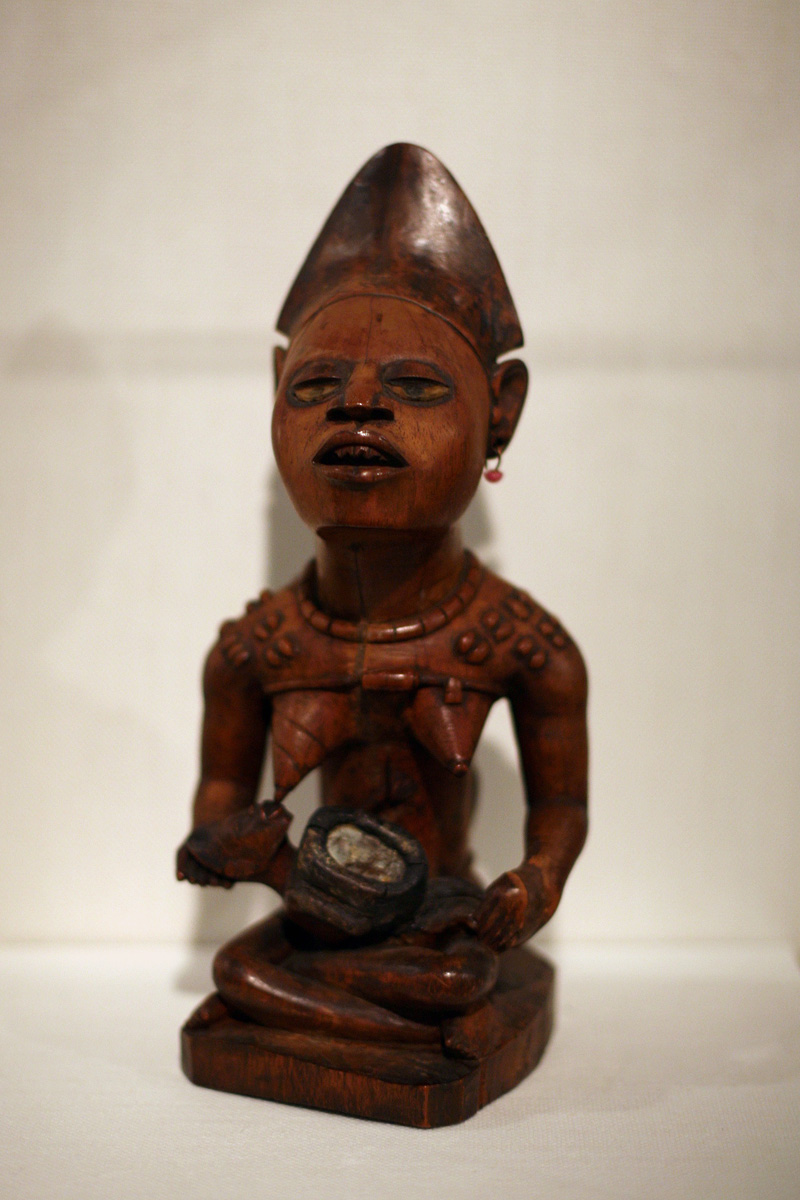
Mother and Child (Phemba)

The Kongo week was a four-day week: Konzo, Nkenge, Nsona and Nkandu. These days are named after the four towns near which traditionally a farmer's market was held in rotation. This idea spread across the Kongo people, and every major district or population center had four rotating markets locations, each center named after these days of the week. Larger market gatherings were rotated once every eight days, on Nsona Kungu.

== Genetics ==
The most common mtdna clades amongst the Bakongo and Mbundu peoples are L1c, L2a, and L3e. The L2a was found to be common in the Democratic Republic of the Congo amongst Bantu groups. Haplogroup E1b1a8 was the most commonly observed y-chromosome clade.

== Nationalism ==
The idea of a Bakongo unity, actually developed in the early twentieth century, primarily through the publication of newspapers in various dialects of the language. In 1910 Kavuna Kafwandani (Kavuna Simon) published an article in the Swedish mission society's Kikongo language newspaper Misanü Miayenge (Words of Peace) calling for all speakers of the Kikongo language to recognize their identity.

The Bakongo people have championed ethnic rivalry and nationalism through sports such as football. The game is organized around ethnic teams, and fans cheer their teams along ethnic lines, such as during matches between the Poto-Poto people and the Kongo people. Further, during international competitions, they join across ethnic lines, states Phyllis Martin, to "assert their independence against church and state".

== Personalities ==
=== Politics, army and resistance ===
- Nzinga Nkuwu
- Pierre II of Kongo
- Alfonso I Nzinga Mvemba, 1st Christian king of Kongo kingdom
- Garcia I of Kongo
- Kimpa Vita, prophetess of the Kingdom of Kongo
- Simon Kimbangu, national prophet and resistant
- André Matswa, independentist leader
- Joseph Kasa-Vubu, 1st President of the Democratic Republic of Congo
- Fulbert Youlou, 1st President of the Congo Republic
- Holden Roberto, independentist leader in Angola
- Justine Kasa-Vubu, 1st president's daughter Democratic Republic of Congo
- Léopold Massiala, ex general in DRC
- Marcellin Lukama, ex army general in DRC
- Ange Diawara, Congolese soldier
- Olive Lembe di Sita, wife of Joseph Kabila
- Daniel Kanza, independentist leader, politician and first Governor of the city of Kinshasa
- Sophie Kanza, first woman minister of the Democratic Republic of Congo
- Thomas Kanza, Congolese politician
- Daniel Safu, politician and national deputy
- Alphonse Massamba-Débat, second President of the Congo Republic
- Gaston Diomi Ndongala, First Mayor of the Ngiri-Ngiri municipality
- Eugène Diomi Ndongala
- Christelle Vuanga, national deputy
- Abdoulaye Yerodia Ndombasi, ex Vice Prime Minister of the Democratic Republic of Congo
- Paul Panda Farnana, first academic and agronomist of Congo
- Albert Fabrice Puela, politician and Congolese minister
- Bundu dia Kongo, political and religious movement
- Front for the Liberation of the Enclave of Cabinda, separatist movement
- Marie-Madeleine Mienze Kiaku, Congolese woman politician
- Luzolo Bambi, ex adviser of Joseph Kabila
- Alliance des Bakongo, political party

=== African Diaspora ===
- Aqualtune Ezgondidu Mahamud da Silva Santos
- Ganga Zumba
- Zumbi dos Palmares
- Macaya
- Zacimba Gaba
- Simon Congo
- Jemmy Cato
- Sebastián Lemba
- Arsenio Rodriguez, Afro-Cuban musician, creator of modern rumba music
- Benny Moré, Afro-Cuban musician
- Wifredo Lam, Cuban artist

=== Arts and entertainment ===
- Jossart N'Yoka Longo, Congolese singer-songwriter, band leader of Zaïko Langa Langa

== Bibliography ==
- Balandier, Georges (1968). Daily Life in the Kingdom of the Kongo: 16th to 19th centuries. New York: Random House.
- Batsîkama Ba Mampuya Ma Ndâwala, Raphaël (1966–1998). Voici les Jaga. Paris: L'Harmattan.
- Bockie, Simon (1993). Death and the Invisible Powers: The World of Kongo Belief Bloomington: Indiana University Press
- Eckholm-Friedman, Kajsa (1991). Catastrophe and Creation: The Transformation of an African Culture Reading and Amsterdam: Harwood
- Fu-kiau kia Bunseki (1969). Le mukongo et le monde que l'entourait/N'kongo ye nza yakundidila Kinshasa: Office national de le recherche et de le devéloppement (Réimpression 2021, Paari éditeur).
- Hilton, Anne (1982). The Kingdom of Kongo. Oxford: Oxford University Press.
- Heusch, Luc de (2000). Le roi de Kongo et les monstres sacrės. Paris: Gallimard.
- Janzen, John (1982). Lemba, 1650–1932: A Drum of Affliction in Africa and the New World. New York: Garland.
- Laman, Karl (1953–1968). The Kongo Uppsala: Alqvist and Wilsells.
- MacGaffey, Wyatt (1970). Custom and Government in the Lower Congo. Berkeley and Los Angeles: University of California Press.
- MacGaffey, Wyatt (1977). "Fetishism Revisited: Kongo nkisi in sociological perspective," Africa 47/2, pp. 140–52.
- MacGaffey, Wyatt (1983). Modern Kongo Prophets: Religion in a Plural Society. Bloomington: Indiana University Press.
- MacGaffey, Wyatt (1986). Religion and Society in Central Africa: The BaKongo of Lower Zaire. Chicago: University of Chicago Press.
- MacGaffey, Wyatt (1991), ed. and trans. Art and Healing of the Bakongo commented upon by themselves: Minkisi from the Laman Collection. Bloomington: Indiana University Press and Stockholm: Folkens-museum etnografiska.
- MacGaffey, Wyatt (1994). "The Eye of Understanding: Kongo minkisi" in Astonishment and Power Washington, DC: Smithsonian Institution Press, pp. 21–103.
- MacGaffey, Wyatt (2000). Kongo Political Culture: The Conceptual Challenge of the Particular Bloomington: Indiana University Press.
- Nsondė, Jean de Dieu (1995). Langues, histoire, et culture Koongo aux XVIIe et XVIIIe siècles Paris: L'Harmattan.
- Randles, William G. L. (1968). L'ancien royaume du Congo des origines à la fin du XIX e siècle. Paris: Mouton
- Thompson, Robert Farris (1983). Flash of the Spirit New York: Random House.
- Thompson, Robert Farris and Jean Cornet (1981). Four Moments of the Sun. Washington, DC: Smithsonian Institution Press
- Thornton, John (1983). The Kingdom of Kongo: Civil War and Transition, 1641–1718. Madison, WI: University of Wisconsin Press.
- Thornton, John (1998). The Kongolese Saint Anthony: Dona Beatriz Kimpa Vita and the Antonian Movement, 1684-1706. Cambridge and New York: Cambridge University Press. ISBN 978-0-521-59649-7.
- RESCOVA, Joaquim pedro neto (2022). Mariage Traditionnel Kongo - Makuela -: Corps résistant du langage culturel bantu. La Loupe, N'Tamo (Brazzaville): Paari éditeur.
- Vansina, Jan M. (1990). Paths in the Rainforests: Toward a History of Political Tradition in Equatorial Africa. University of Wisconsin Press. ISBN 978-0-299-12573-8.
- Vansina, Jan M. (2010). Being Colonized: The Kuba Experience in Rural Congo, 1880–1960. University of Wisconsin Press. ISBN 978-0-299-23643-4.
- Volavka, Zdenka (1998). Crown and Ritual: The Royal Insignia of Ngoyo ed. Wendy A Thomas. Toronto: University of Toronto Press.
- Richard Serge ZINGOULA (2021). Lexique des Anthroponymes kongo: Lutangulu lua mazina. La Loupe, N'Tamo (Brazzaville): Paari éditeur.
- Aristóteles Kandimba (2019). O Livro dos Nomes de Angola : Cerca de 2.000 nomes de origem Bantu. Alende, Perfil Criativo.
