= Simbi =

Water spirit in Kongo religion

- Water Spirit
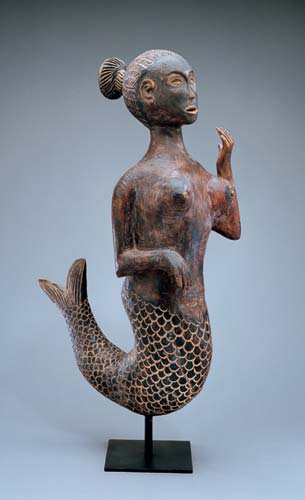
- Depiction of Mamba Muntu, also known as Dona Fish, in present-day Angola
- Affiliation: Kongo • Hoodoo • Palo • Candomblé
- Abode: Atlantic Ocean, Seas, Rivers (Nzadi), Forests (Mfinda)
- Ethnic group: Kongo peoples • Songye people • Black Americans

Equivalents
- Bantu: Mamba Muntu
- Haitian: Lwa
- Ovimbundu: Dona Fish
- Sawabantu: Jengu

A Simbi (also spelled Cymbee and Sim'bi, pl. Bisimbi or Basimbi) is a Central African guardian spirit of the water and nature in traditional Bakongo religion, as well as in African diaspora spiritual traditions, such as Hoodoo in the southern United States and Palo in Cuba. Simbi have been historically identified with water people, or mermaids, pottery, snakes, gourds, and fire. Due to the Atlantic slave trade, a large percentage of Bantu peoples were either bought or stolen from Africa to the Americas. This forced migration of over 12.5 million people is the main reason that the veneration of simbi exists today in countries, such as the United States, Brazil, Cuba, and Haiti.

== Etymology ==
While there is little written historical record of the word simbi, there is consensus that it originated within Bantu-speaking and Kongo-speaking communities and almost certainly began as a means for them to understand the spiritual nature of the world around them.

Some believe the word simbi derives from simba, a Kikongo word that means "to hold, keep, preserve. The similar phrase, isimba ia nsi, which translates to "a distinguished person in the community," was recorded in an early Kikongo dictionary in the seventeenth century. This phrase and others, such as kisímbi kinsí, which translates to "the very old person who does not die," are a few of the earliest evidences of the spiritual connection of bisimbi to the land of the living and the land of the dead.

The word basimbi also translates to "guardians" with the phrase isimba ia nsi later becoming "guardians of the land."

== Kongo spirituality ==
The Bakongo people traditionally believe that bisimbi are magically water spirits (in kikongo: nkisi mia mamba) that can appear as a person, a snake, pottery, a calabash vine, or Kalûnga, a spark of fire, similar to the spark that begot the universe in Kongo creation mythology. There have also been claims of bisimbi appearing as birds, twisted trees and mermaid-like beings. They are seen as the guardians of nature and the intermediaries who travel the Kalûnga Line between Ku Seke, the physical world of the living, and Ku Mpémba, the spiritual world of the ancestors. Bisimbi are also believed to be spiritual guides, using storytelling and oral tradition to connect the living to the ancestors and their history. The likening of living elders to the bisimbi in the phrase kisímbi kinsí highlights the importance of Bakongo elders to the spiritual well-being of the community and the passing of their beliefs from one generation to the next.

== The American diaspora ==
=== African American Hoodoo ===
The belief that bisimbi "inhabit rocks, gullies, streams, and pools, and are able to influence the fertility and well-being of those living in the area" was translocated to the United States by enslaved Bakongo and Mbundu peoples. Because forty percent of Africans taken during the Atlantic slave trade came from Central Africa's Congo Basin, and forty percent of all enslaved people brought to South Carolina between 1733 and 1807 were people of Kongo or Ambundu descent from Angola, bisimbi became revered in the United States in Black American communities in Hoodoo tradition across the American South.

==== Sightings ====
The earliest known record of simbi spirits was recorded in the nineteenth century by Edmund Ruffin who was a wealthy slaveholder from Virginia, and traveled to South Carolina "to keep the slave economic system viable through agricultural reform."

At Pooshee plantation on the Santee Canal not too far from Woodboo, Ruffin stated that a young slave boy went to a fountain for water late at night and was very frightened by a cymbee (Simbi water spirit) who was running around and around the fountain. Although few witnesses to the appearance of cymbees were found by Ruffin, he stated that they are generally believed by the slaves to be frequent and numerous. Part of the superstition was that it was bad luck for anyone who saw one to tell of the occurrence, or refer to it; And that his death would be the certain penalty, if he told of the meeting for some weeks afterwards. Another occurrence from an enslaved man said simbi spirits have long hair.

==== Sukey and The Mermaid ====
In Black American folklore, the Gullah Geechee people in the Carolina Lowcountry have a children's story called Sukey and the Mermaid about a girl named Sukey meeting a mermaid named Mama Jo. Mama Jo in the story helps and protects Sukey and financially supported her by giving her gold coins. This story comes from the belief in Simbi spirits in Central Africa that came to the United States during the Atlantic slave trade. In Africa, Simbi nature spirits protect and provide riches to their followers. There are folk stories of people meeting mermaids in Central Africa and the Middle Passage.

=== Haitian Vodou ===
The belief in bisimbi also exists in the traditional spiritual practices of Haitians. While Haitian Vodou is largely known for its West African influences, primarily those from Benin and Nigeria, it also contains Central African influences from the Republic of the Congo, Democratic Republic of the Congo, and Angola in the form of bisimbi. Though often referred to as lwa, bisimbi such as Mami Wata, Nsimba and Nzuzi are still nlongo, or sacred, in traditional Haitian spirituality and culture.

=== Palo ===
In an Afro-Cuban religion called Palo, bisimbi are called both Nkitas and Mpungus (also spelled Ampungus). They are similar to Kongo nature spirits that occupy the Nfinda, or forest, which is synonymous with the Mfinda in Bakongo religion. They are believed to be guardians of all of nature, including lakes, forests or mountains.

== In popular culture ==
- Governor General Michaëlle Jean of Ottawa, Canada, who was born in Haiti, bears two simbi serpents as supporters on her coat of arms.
- The Deep, a novella by Rivers Solomon, incorporates Black American folklore of a mermaid-like people, who are called wajinru in the story. They descend from Africans who were either thrown overboard or purposely jumped from slave ships, choosing death over enslavement.

== See also ==
- Jengu
- Kianda
- Mamba Muntu
- Nkisi
