= Kalûnga Line =

Concept in West-Central African Bantu cosmology

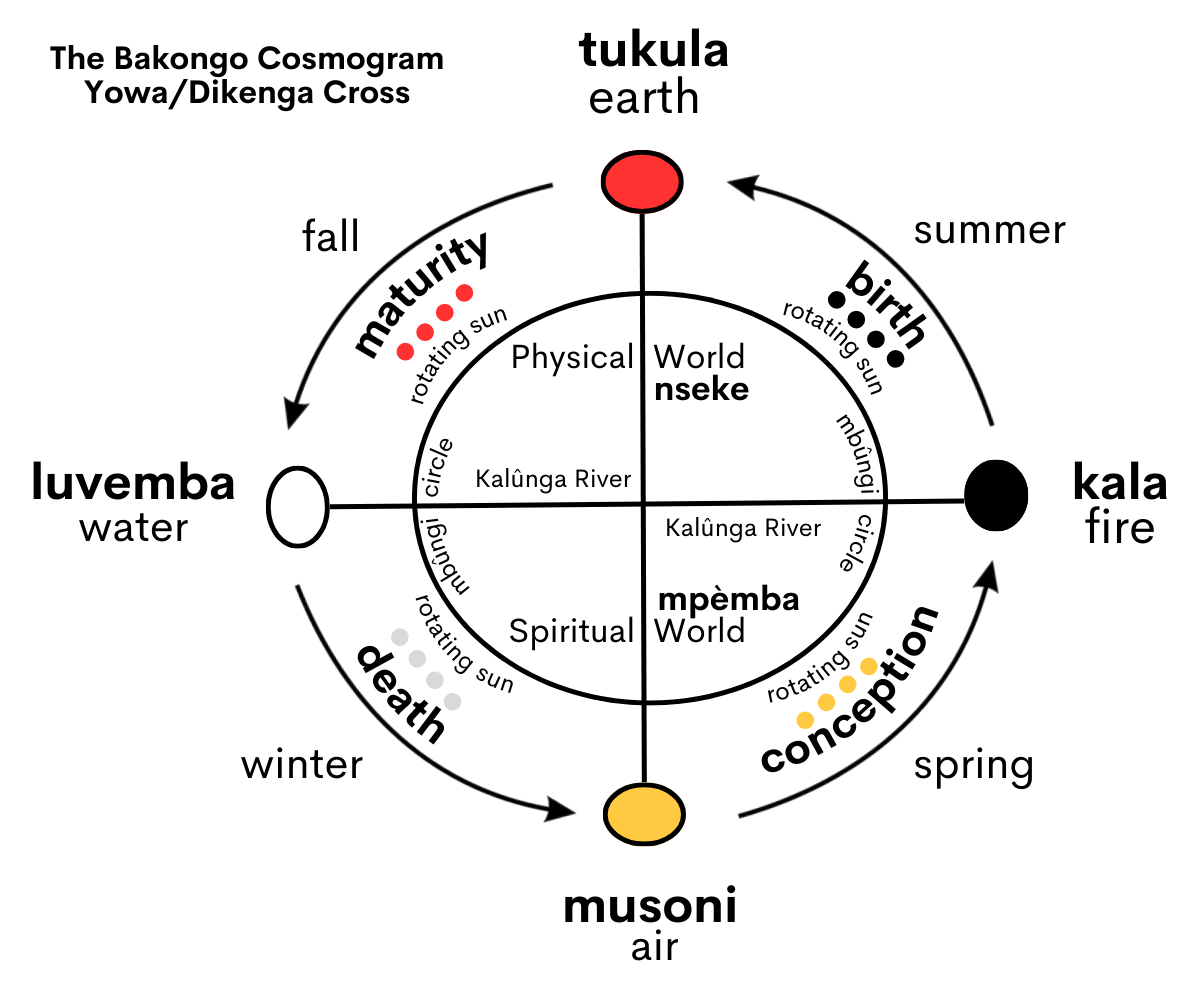

The Kalûnga Line is a foundational concept in West-Central African Bantu cosmologies—most prominently within Ambundu (Kimbundu speakers), Kongo, and Chokwe traditions—referring both to Kalûnga as the Supreme God (the infinite source of life and creation) and to the watery, energetic boundary separating the land of the living (Ku Nseke) from the spiritual realm of deceased ancestors (Ku Mpemba or Kalunga).

In West-Central African languages such as Kimbundu, Kikongo, and Umbundu, Kalûnga is directly the name for God, as well as the term for the ocean, infinity, and the ultimate force of change. Originally, Kalûnga was understood across the region as the divine, fiery life-force that begot the universe, as well as a symbol for the spiritual nature of the sun, water, and transformation. The concept forms the core of West-Central African cosmograms, mapping the eternal circle of existence overseen by the Supreme Creator.

== Kalûnga as Divinity and Etymology ==
Across Central and Southwestern African Bantu traditions—including the Ambundu, Ovimbundu, and neighboring groups—Kalûnga is venerated directly as the Supreme God, the Almighty, and the Self-Existent Creator. The term is frequently used interchangeably with or alongside Nzambi (as in Nzambi Kalunga), representing the divine force that permeates all creation and existence.

Etymologically, Kalûnga derives from a shared Proto-Bantu root (*-lung-, meaning "to put in order, to adjust, to unite, or to be complete"). In Kimbundu and Umbundu theology, Kalunga expresses the infinite nature of God, which is visually and spiritually symbolized by the vastness of the ocean, the depths of the earth, and the realm of the ancestors. In the geographical Congo-Angola basin, physical bodies of water—including the Congo River (Nzadi o Nzere) and the Atlantic coastline—were understood as earthly reflections of Kalûnga's omnipresent boundary. This cosmological understanding was translocated across the Atlantic diaspora during the transatlantic slave trade.

== Creation and Cosmic Order ==
In West-Central African cosmology, creation begins in a primordial circular void (termed mbûngi in Kongo tradition). The Supreme Deity (Nzambi Kalunga or Kalunga) generated a primordial spark of fire, also called Kalûnga, into the void, which expanded into an immense energetic force that birthed the universe, stars, and planets. Because of this, Kalûnga represents continuous motion, heat, life, and transformation. Across Ambundu, Bakongo, and Chokwe theology, God is intrinsically tied to motion and change.

The human life cycle (the spiritual journey of a person) mirrors the cosmic trajectory of the sun across four moments overseen by Kalûnga:

- Musoni: Conception in the spiritual realm and the womb.
- Kala: Physical birth, symbolized by the rising sun in the east.
- Tukula: Maturity and wisdom, symbolized by the noon sun.
- Luvemba: Physical death and passage into the ancestral realm (Ku Mpémba or Kalunga), symbolized by the setting sun in the west.

Humans possess a dual spiritual nature (mwèla-ngindu), allowing existence to continue beyond physical death across the Kalûnga threshold into the divine ancestral realm.

== The Cosmogram and Spiritual Threshold ==
As Kalûnga filled the void during creation, it established an invisible divine boundary separating existence into two worlds: 1. Ku Nseke: The physical, visible realm of living human beings. 2. Ku Mpèmba (or Kalunga): The invisible, subterranean and spiritual realm of ancestors and divine forces.

The Kalûnga Line represents both this sacred divide and the spiritual pathway carrying souls between life, death, and rebirth. In Ambundu (Kimbundu) tradition, the realm of the ancestors beyond this threshold is governed by Kalunga Ngombe (or Kalunga-a-Ngombe), the sovereign lord of the underworld who receives human souls after they cross the boundary from physical life.

Visually rendered in Central African cosmograms—such as the Bakongo Dikenga cross and related Angolan ancestral iconography—the line symbolizes the eternal cycle of the soul. Water spirits (such as simbi or akishi) inhabit bodies of water along the threshold, guiding souls across the divine divide.

== Transatlantic Diaspora and the Americas ==
Because a large percentage of enslaved Central Africans brought to the Americas originated from Kimbundu-speaking areas (such as the historical kingdoms of Ndongo and Matamba) as well as Kongo, the theology of Kalûnga became a foundation of African diaspora spiritual traditions across Brazil, Haiti, Cuba, and the North American Gullah coast.

Enslaved Africans recognized the Atlantic Ocean as the physical manifestation of the Kalûnga Line. Being shipped west across the sea was seen as crossing into the land of the dead, while physical death in the Americas was viewed as crossing back across Kalûnga to return home to Africa or enter the ancestral realm. This theology remains preserved today in practices such as African-American Hoodoo ocean rituals, Brazilian Candomblé Angola, and Haitian Vodou.

== See also ==
- Nzambi Ampungu
- Mbundu people
- Kongo religion
- Candomblé Angola
- Hoodoo (spirituality)
