= Nzambi Ampungu =

Bakongo god

Nzambi
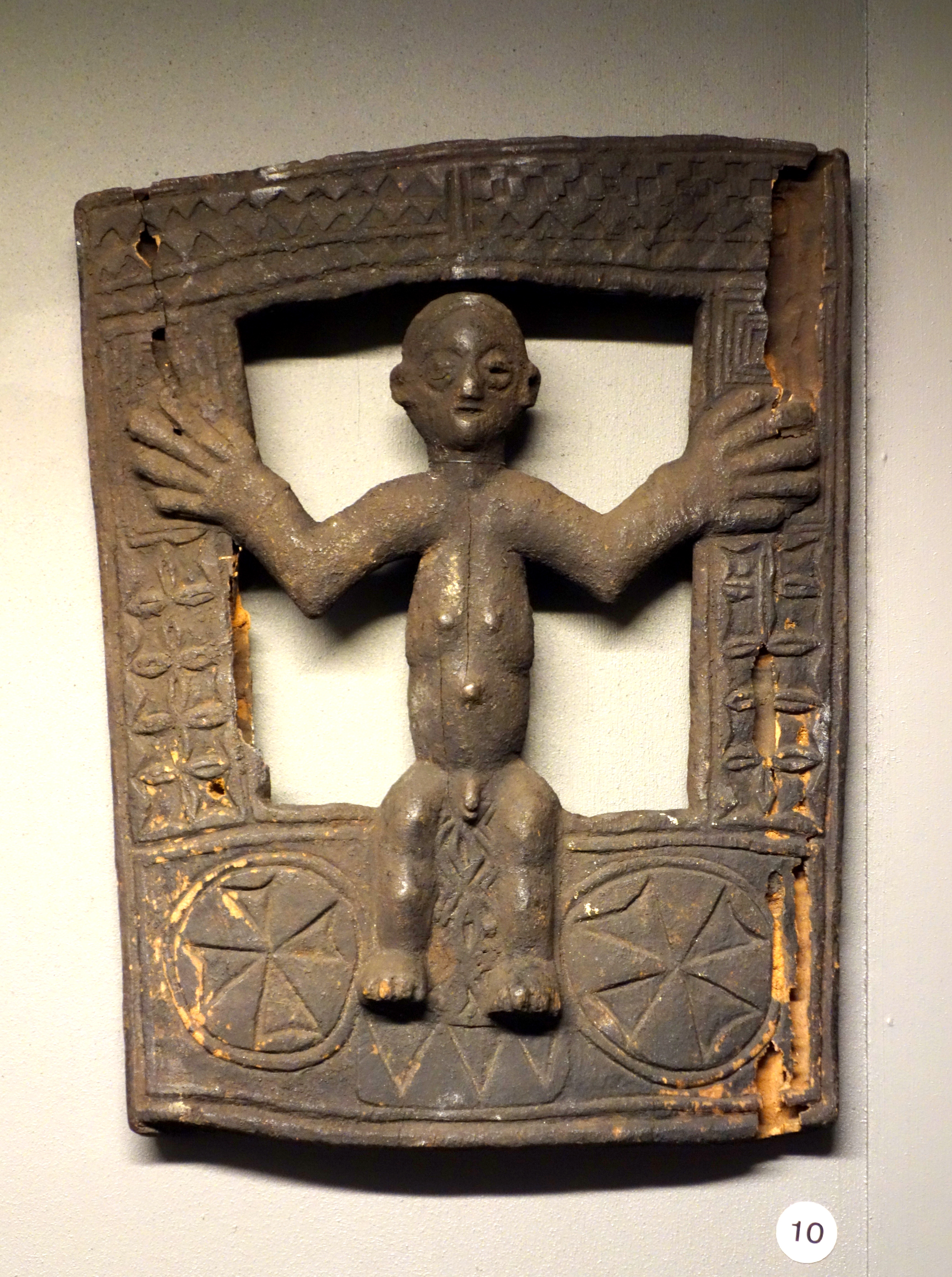
- "Santu Nzambi" by a Holo artist. Kwango province, Democratic Republic of Congo.
- Venerated in: Kongo religion
- Symbol: Sun
- Ethnic group: Bakongo
- Consort: Nzambici

Equivalents
- Igbo: Chukwu
- Kushite religion: Apedemak
- Egyptian: Aten
- Bantu: Nyambe
- Azande: Mbori

Nzambi Ampungu (also Nzambi, Nzambi Mpungu, Nzambi Sundidi, Nzambi Ampungu Tulendo) is the Supreme God, eternal Sky Father and God of the Sun (fire) in traditional Kongo spirituality. His female counterpart is Nzambici, the Sky Mother and Goddess of the Moon. Among other Central African Bantu peoples, such as the Chokwe, and in the Kingdom of Ndongo, Nzambi Ampungu was also called Kalunga, the god of fire and change. This may have a connection to an element of Bakongo cosmology called Kalûnga. It was seen as the spark of fire that begot all life in the universe. After Portuguese colonization, Nzambi became synonymous with the Christian God and existed chiefly as the Creator God.

== The Creator ==
The Bakongo people believe that "The world in its beginning was empty; it was an mbûngi, an empty thing, a cavity, without visible life." Mbûngi (also called mwasi and mpampa) was symbolized as a circle of emptiness. The creator god Nzambi, along with his female counterpart called Nzambici, is believed to have created a spark of fire, called kalûnga, and summoned it inside of mbûngi. Kalûnga grew and became a great force of energy inside of mbûngi, creating a mass of fusion. When the mass grew too hot, the heated force caused the mass to break apart and hurl projectiles outside of mbûngi.

Those projectiles became individual masses that scattered about, and when the fires cooled, planets were created. The Bakongo believe this was the process Nzambi used to create the universe, with the Sun, stars, planets, etc. The Bakongo referred to this process as luku lwalamba Nzambi, or "God created and cooked dough." Because of this, kalûnga is seen as the origin of life, or moyo wawo mu nza, and the Bakongo people believe that life requires constant change and perpetual motion. Thus, Nzambi is also referred to as Kalûnga, the God of change. Similarities between the Bakongo belief of Kalûnga and the Big Bang Theory have been studied. Unlike many other traditional African spiritualities, the creation beliefs of the Bakongo is compatible with creatio ex nihilo.

== History ==
Nzambi Ampungu was recorded as the name of the God of the Kongo people as early as the early 16th century by Portuguese who visited the Kingdom of Kongo.

European missionaries along with Kongo intellectuals (including King Afonso I of Kongo) set out to render European Christian religious concepts into Kikongo and they chose this name to represent God. Jesuit missionaries in the 1540s noted the acceptance of this relationship as well, and it was probably included in the now lost catechism produced by Carmelites in Kikongo in 1557. It was used for God in the catechism of 1624, a translation by the "best masters of the church" in Kongo under the supervision of the Jesuit priest Mateus Cardoso.

Prior to European colonization, Nzambi Ampungu and his female counterpart, Nzambici, were perceived as the "Marvels of Marvels" who existed everywhere simultaneously and gave life to all things. Nzambi was the "sovereign master," the God of the sun (fire) and change. It was believed that Nzambi/Nzambici created the universe, the spiritual world (Ku Mpémba) and the physical world (Ku Nseke). Contrary to what the title "the Great Spirit" implies, Nzambi/Nzambici and the spiritual nature of the Kongo people did not exist under the same confines of hierarchy as the omnipotent God of the monotheistic Abrahamic religions (Judaism, Christianity, and Islam). All spirits within Kongo spirituality were believed to be equally significant and each had their own purpose across both worlds.

After the introduction of Catholicism by the Portuguese, there was a massive effort to convert Central Africans by creating connections between Christianity and their traditional African religions. While it was largely a failure for ethnic groups, like the Mbundu in the Kingdom of Ndongo, the Portuguese were able to persuade many Bakongo in the Kingdom of Kongo that Nzambi Ampungu was the Christian God and that the other spirits were similar to angels, who were subservient to God. Not only did this act make way for an easier conversion of the Bakongo people to Christianity, it also created a hierarchy in Bakongo spirituality that reduced other spirits like Nzambici, simbi and nkisi to "lesser spirits" that no longer had relevant voices in spiritual matters.

One Kikongo saying is "Ku tombi Nzambi ko, kadi ka kena ye nitu ko." It means "Don’t look for God, He does not have a body."

== Nzambi in the African diaspora ==
=== Candomblé Bantu ===
In the Afro-Brazilian religion of Candomblé Bantu, Nzambi is the "sovereign master". He created the earth and then withdrew from the world. Nzambi Ampungu remains responsible for rainfall and health.

=== Kumina ===
In the Jamaican religion of Kumina, there is a high creator god is known as "King Zombi" which is a variation of Nzambi.

=== Palo ===
In the Afro-Cuban religion of Palo, Nzambi is the god who created the universe and animated it. Nzambi resides in all natural things, and the spirits of the dead. Long deceased ancestors who became spirits will become enveloped in the natural elements over a period of time and thus, Nzambi himself. The natural powers of Nzambi can be harnessed by a Nganga and in common ceremonies. Afro-Cubans also believe in Mpungus (also spelled Ampungus), or nature spirits, that are similar to bisimbi spirits that occupy the Nfinda, or forest, which is synonymous with the Mfinda in Bakongo religion.
