= Candomblé Angola =

Branch of Candomblé religion

Candomblé Bantu
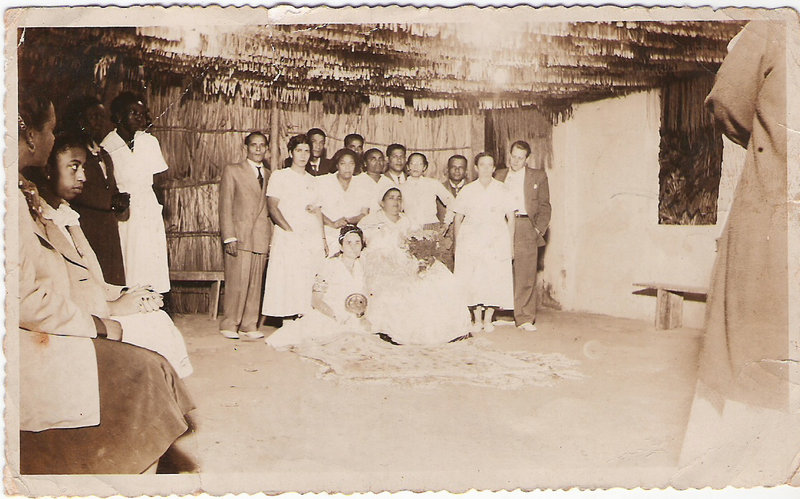
- Candomblé Bantu practitioners in Bahia, 1940s
- Classification: Afro-Brazilian religion
- Priesthood: Mãe-de-santo or Pai-de-santo

Candomblé Angola (also called Candomblé Bantu or Banto) is one of the major branches (nations) of the Candomblé religious belief system in Brazil. It developed in the Portuguese Empire among Kongo and Mbundu slaves who spoke Kikongo and Kimbundu languages. The supreme and creative god is Nzambi (also called Nzambi Ampungu and Nzambi Mpungu). Below him are the Jinkisi or Minkisi, deities of Bantu mythology. These deities operate in the same manner as Olorun and the other orishas of the Yoruba religion. Minkisi is a Kongo language term: it is the plural of Nkisi, meaning "receptacle". Akixi comes from the Kimbundu language term Mukixi.

== Etymology ==
The word "Bantu" means "people"; it is a combination of ba, a plural noun marker and -ntu, meaning "person". "Banto" was a generic term used by the Portuguese in Brazil to describe people who spoke Bantu languages.

== Pantheon ==
- Nzambi is the "sovereign master"; he created the earth, then withdrew from the world. Nzambi Mpungu remains responsible for rainfall and health.
- Aluvaiá (also Bombo Njila, Pambu Njila, Nzila, Mujilo, Mavambo, Vangira, Njila, Maviletango) is an intermediary between human beings and other Nkisi; he is additionally the protector of the houses.
- Nkosi Mukumbe (also Hoji Mukumbi, Panzu, Xauê) is the Nkisi of roads, agriculture, and iron. He is associated with Ogun in Yoruba religion.
- Mutalambô
- Gongobira
- Katendê
- Loango
- Kaviungo
- Angorô and Angoroméa
- Kitembo
- Matamba
- Kisimbi
- Kaitumbá
- Zumbarandá
- Wunje
- Lembá Dilê

== See also ==
- Candomblé Jeje
- Candomblé Ketu
- Kongo religion
