= Candomblé =

Syncretic religion from Brazil

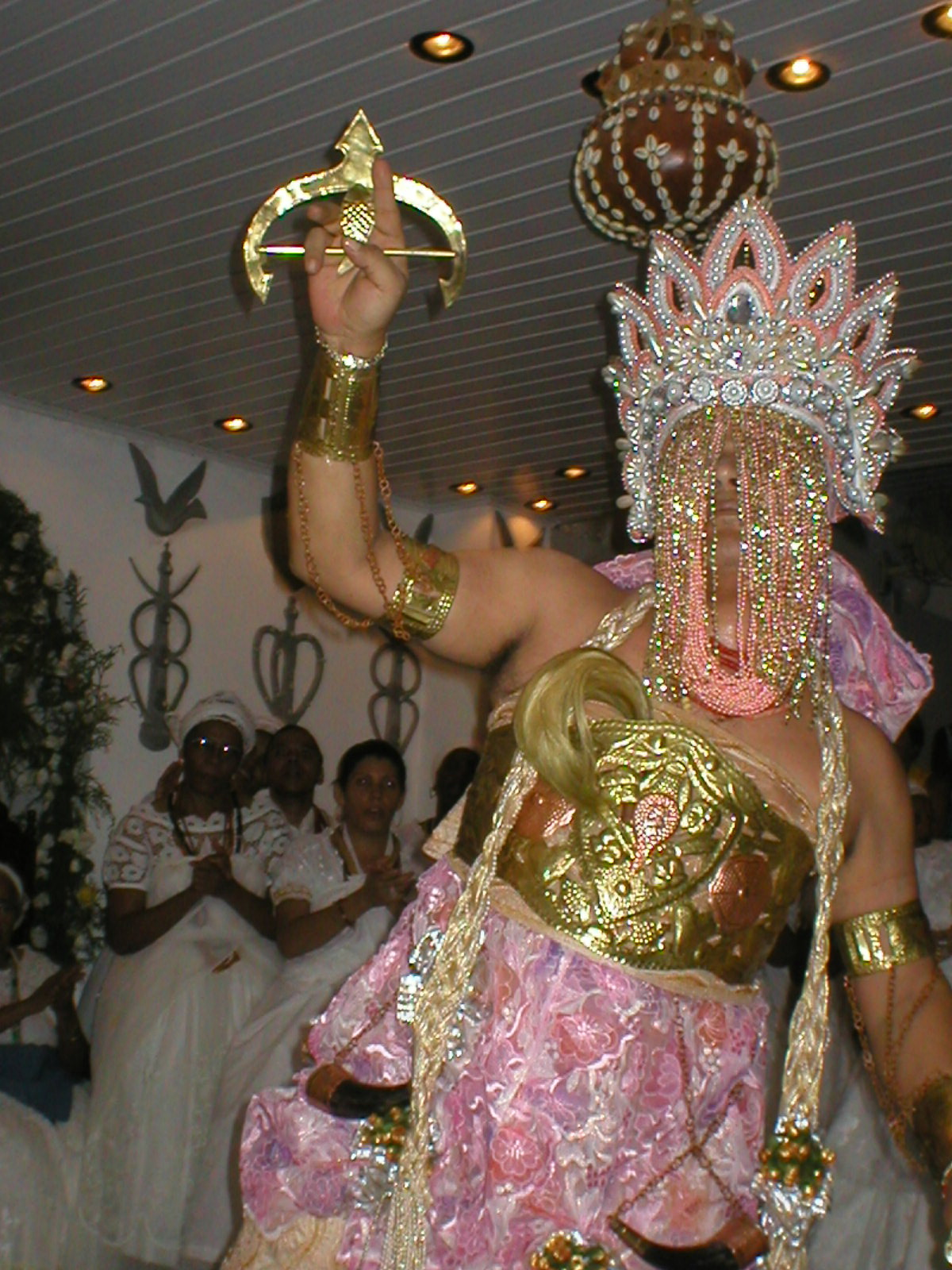
A practitioner dressed as the orixá Obá in Brazil; the possession of adherents by orixás is central to Candomblé

Candomblé (Portuguese pronunciation: [kɐ̃dõˈblɛ]) is an African diasporic religion that developed in Brazil during the 19th century. It arose through a process of syncretism between several of the traditional religions of West and Central Africa, especially those of the Yoruba, Bantu, and Gbe, coupled with influences from Roman Catholicism. There is no central authority in control of Candomblé, which is organized around autonomous terreiros (houses).

Candomblé venerates spirits, known varyingly as orixás, inkice, or vodun, which are deemed subservient to a transcendent creator god, Olodumaré. Deriving their names and attributes from traditional West African deities, the orixás are linked with Roman Catholic saints. Each individual is believed to have a tutelary orixá who has been connected to them since before birth and who informs their personality. An initiatory tradition, Candomblé's members usually meet in terreiros run by a mãe de santo (priestess) or pai de santo (priest). A central ritual involves practitioners drumming, singing, and dancing to encourage an orixá to possess one of their members, with whom congregants can then interact. The orixás are given offerings such as fruit and sacrificed animals, while their will is deciphered through divination. Offerings may also be given to lesser spirits, including caboclos and the spirits of the dead, the egun. Healing rituals and the preparation of amulets and herbal remedies also play a prominent role.

Candomblé developed among Afro-Brazilian communities amid the Atlantic slave trade of the 16th to 19th centuries. It arose through the blending of the traditional religions brought to Brazil by enslaved West and Central Africans, the majority of them Yoruba, Fon, and Bantu, with the Roman Catholicism of the Portuguese colonialists who then controlled the area. It primarily coalesced in the Bahia region during the 19th century. Following Brazil's independence from Portugal, the constitution of 1891 enshrined freedom of religion in the country, although Candomblé remained marginalized by the Roman Catholic establishment, which typically associated it with criminality. In the 20th century, growing emigration from Bahia spread Candomblé both throughout Brazil and abroad, while also influencing the development of another religion, Umbanda, in the 1920s. Since the late 20th century, some practitioners have emphasized a re-Africanization process to remove Roman Catholic influences and create forms of Candomblé closer to traditional West African religion.

The religion is divided into denominations, known as nations, based on which traditional African belief system has been its primary influence. The most prominent nations are the Ketu, Jeje, and Angola. Candomblé is centred in Brazil although smaller communities exist elsewhere, especially in other parts of South America. Both in Brazil and abroad Candomblé has spread beyond its Afro-Brazilian origins and is practiced by individuals of various ethnicities.

== Definition and terminology ==
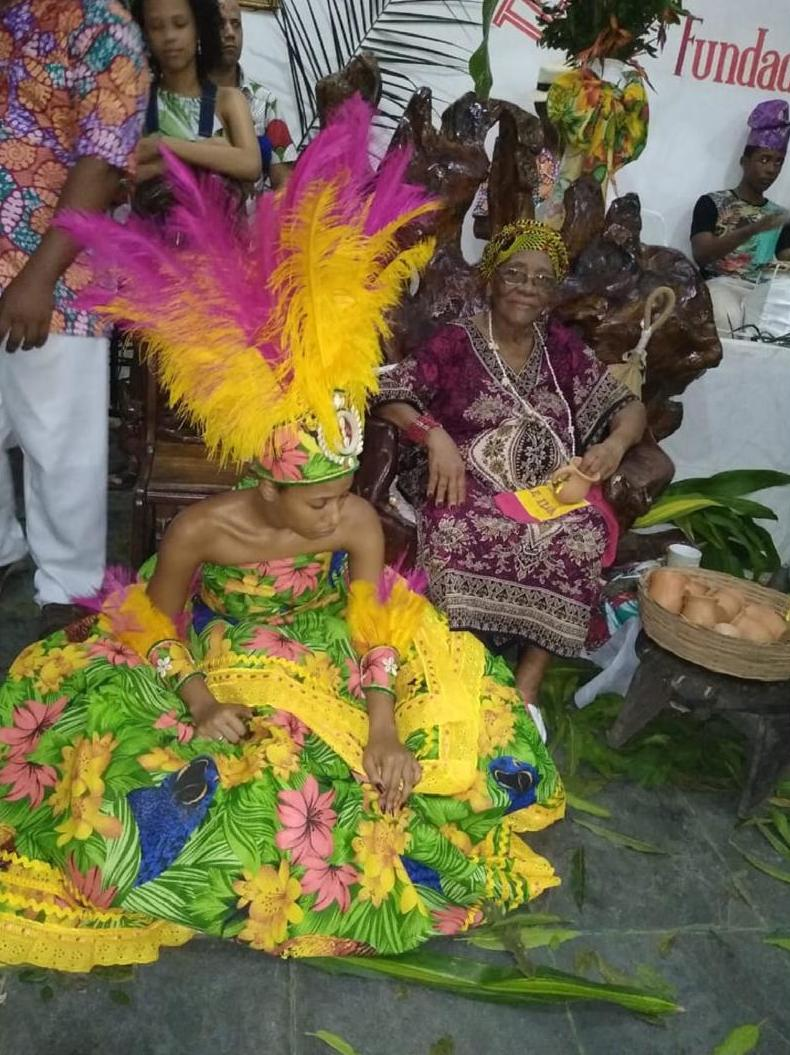
Practitioners inside the Terreiro Matamba Tombenci Neto in Ilhéus, Bahia.

Candomblé is a "neo-African" or African American religion, and more specifically an Afro-Brazilian religion. It arose in 19th-century Brazil, where the imported traditional African religions of enslaved West Africans had to adapt to a slave colony in which Roman Catholicism was the official religion. It is thus one of several religions that emerged in the Americas through the interaction of West African and Roman Catholic traditions, and for this reason is considered a "sister religion" of Cuban Santería and Haitian Vodou.

Candomblé's followers are called povo de santo (people of saint), or Candomblecistas. The term Candomblé itself probably derives from a Bantu word for dances, kandombele, which also developed into the term for a dance style in Argentina and Uruguay, Candombe. Another word sometimes applied to Candomblé is macumba; this generic term can be applied to Afro-Brazilian religions as a whole but is especially associated with sorcery or black magic, and thus some Candomblécistas distance themselves from it.

Candomblé is not institutionalised, with no central authority to determine doctrine and orthodoxy, and no central sacred text. It is heterogenous, displaying regional variation in its beliefs and practices. Each lineage or community of practitioners is autonomous, approaching the religion in ways informed by their tradition and the choices of their leader.

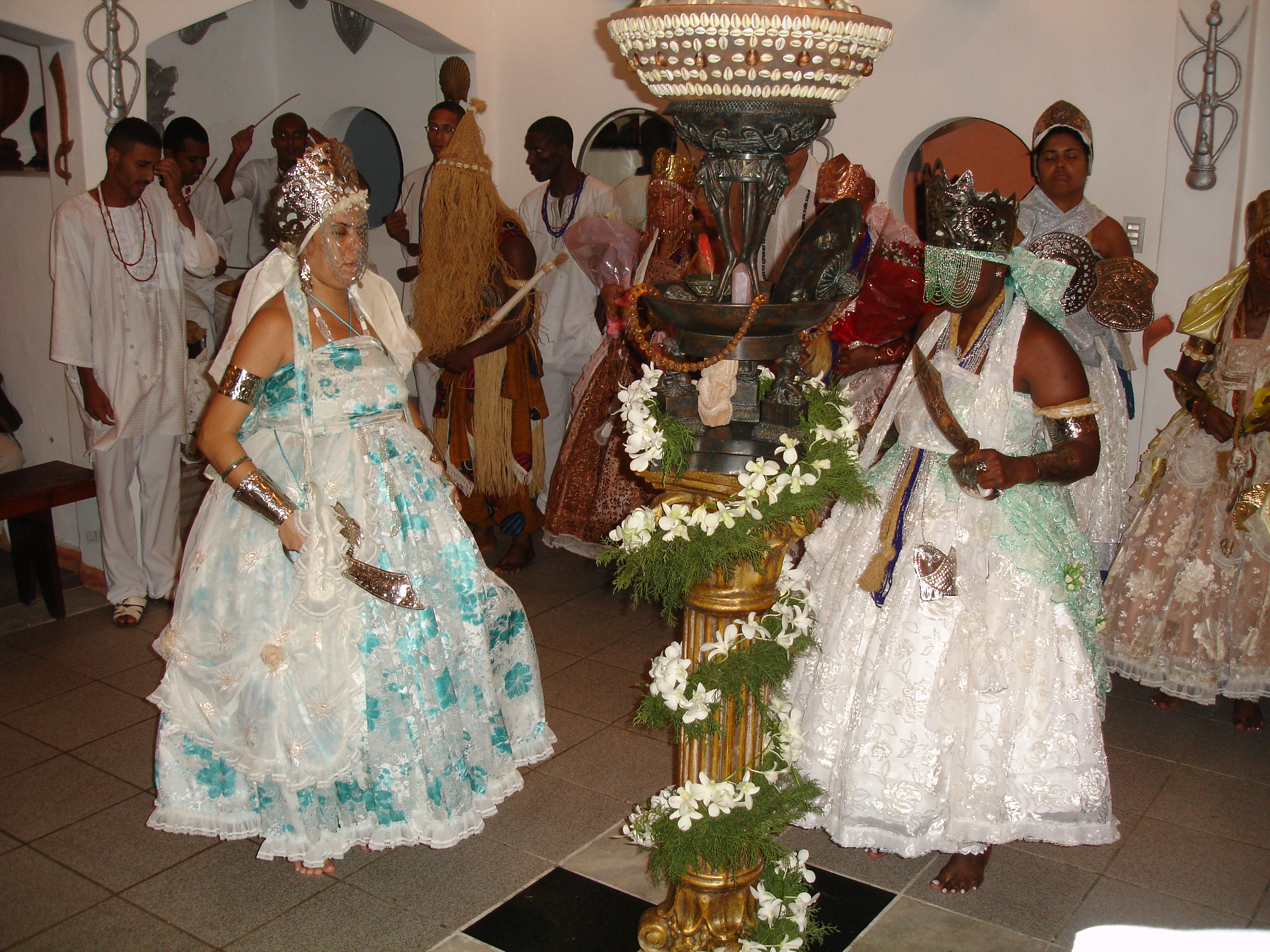
A Candomblé ritual in 2008

Most Candomblecistas also practice Roman Catholicism—some priests and priestesses of Candomblé refuse to initiate anyone who is not a baptised Roman Catholic—while other practitioners have also pursued Evangelical Protestantism, New Age practices, or Buddhism. Sometimes these non-Candomblist elements have been directly integrated into Candomblé itself; there are reports of a Brazilian practitioner including a statue of the Mahayana Buddhist deity Hotei on their altar, and of a Belgian Candomblé group that incorporated characters from Welsh and Slavic mythologies in their practice. Candomblé has sometimes also been influenced by Spiritism, a French variant of Spiritualism, although many Spiritists distinguish their religion from Afro-Brazilian traditions.

Afro-Brazilian religions often mix with each other rather than existing in pure forms, with many scholars viewing them on a continuum rather than as wholly discrete entities. Candomblé shares the names of its deities, the orixás, with Umbanda, a religion formed in Rio de Janeiro in the 1920s. Umbandista groups exist on a spectrum from those emphasising connections to Spiritism to those stressing links with Afro-Brazilian religions like Candomblé; the anthropologist Diana Brown noted that the boundary separating Umbanda from Candomblé was largely "a matter of individual opinion". Omolocô was founded in Rio de Janeiro as an intermediate religion between Candomblé and Umbanda, with traditions merging these two systems sometimes labelled "Umbandomblé" by outsiders. There are also other Afro-Brazilian religions rooted largely in specific regions, including Babassuê in Pará, Batuque in Rio Grande do Sul, and Tambor de Mina in Maranhão and Pará.

=== Nações ===
Candomblé divides into traditions known as nações (nations). The three most prominent are Nagô or Ketu (Queto), Jeje (Gege) or Mina-Jeje, and Angola or Congo-Angola; others include the Ijexá (Ijesha), Egba, Efan (Ekiti) and Caboclo. Each derives influence from a different African language group; Ketu uses Yoruba, Jeje adopts Ewe, and the Angola draws from the Bantu language group. Informed by these ethno-linguistic origins, each Candomblé nation has its own lexicon, chants, deities, sacred objects, and traditional knowledge. Although originating among ethnic differences, this has largely eroded over time, with members drawn to a nation for reasons other than ethnic heritage.

An initiate can transfer from one nation to another, a process referred to as trocar as águas ("to change the waters"). Attitudes between nations can be negative; those groups which emphasise claims to "African purity" have often denigrated other nations they deem more syncretic, with the Angola nation sometimes regarded as the most syncretic. The Nagô nation is the largest, reflecting how Yoruba traditional religion became the dominant West African influence within Afro-Brazilian religions in the 19th century, and even among nations other than the Nagô, Yoruba-derived terminology predominates widely.

== Beliefs ==
=== Olorun and the orixás ===
Candomblé teaches the existence of a supreme divinity called Olorun or Olodumare. This entity is regarded as the creator of everything but is thought distant and unapproachable, and thus not specifically worshipped in Candomblé.

==== The orixás ====
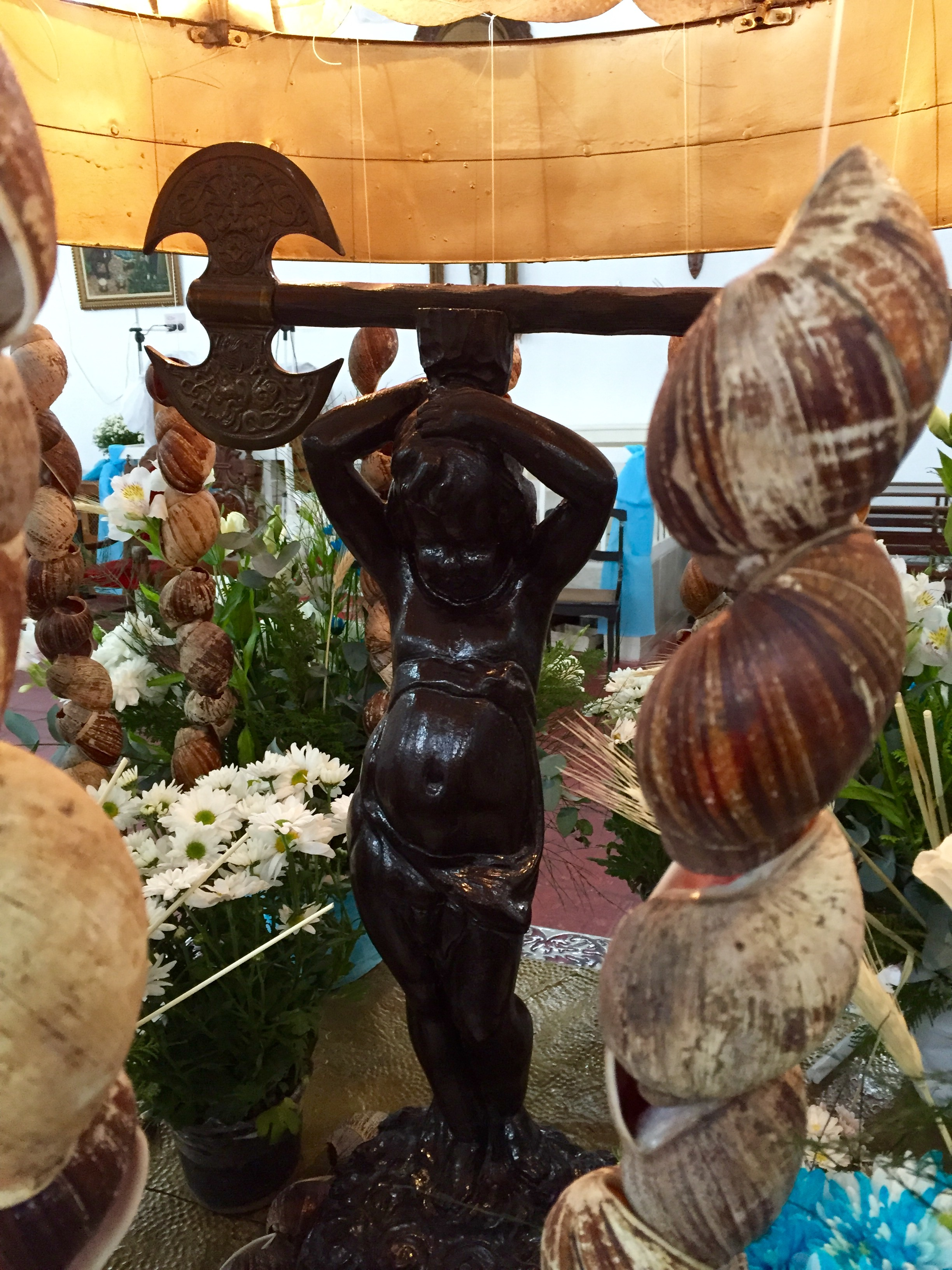
A statue depicting the orixá Xangô inside a Candomblé terreiro in São Paulo; he is distinguished by his double-headed axe, the oxê

Candomblé revolves around spirits termed orixás (orishas) or santos ("saints"). In the Angola tradition they are sometimes termed inkice, and in the Jeje tradition vodun. The males are termed aborôs, the females iabás. Believed to mediate between humanity and Olorun, the orixás have been varyingly conceived as ancestral figures, or embodiments of forces of nature. Their names may differ according to nation; in Nagô they commonly possess Yoruba names, but in the Jeje nation they are instead given Fon names.

The orixás are deemed morally ambiguous, each with their own virtues and flaws, and are sometimes in conflict with each other. Each orixá is associated with specific colours, foods, animals, and minerals, favoring certain offerings. Each orixá is associated with a particular day of the week; the priesthood also states that each year is governed by a specific orixá who will influence the events taking place within it. Their personalities are informed by a key conceptual opposition in Candomblé, that of the cool versus the hot.

Oxalá is the chief orixá, depicted as a frail old man who walks with a pachorô sceptre as a walking stick. Practitioners commonly believe that Olorun tasked him with creating humanity. In some accounts, all of the junior orixás are the children of Oxalá and one of his two wives, Nanã and Iemanjá. This trio are associated with water; Oxalá with fresh water, Nanã with the rain, and Iemanjá with the ocean. Other accounts present this cosmogony differently, for instance by claiming that Oxalá fathered all other orixás alone, having created the world from a mingau pudding. An alternative claim among practitioners is that Nanã is the grandmother of Oxalá and the mother of Iemanjá, the latter becoming both mother and wife to Oxalá.

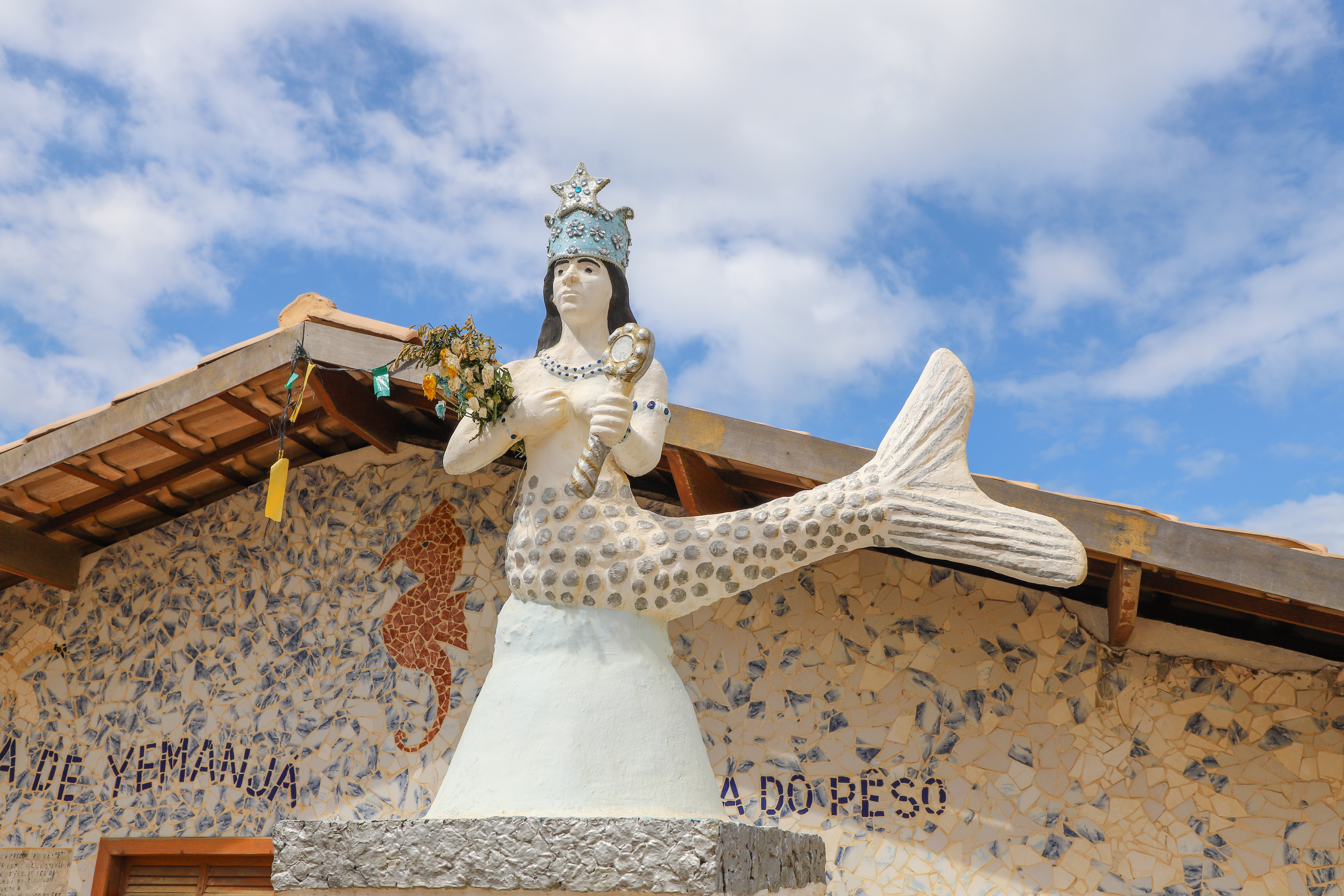
A statue of Iemanjá in Salvador

Xangô is the orixá associated with thunder and lightning; one of his wives is Obá, a warrior who has only one ear. Ogum is the orixá of battle and of iron, often depicted with a machete; his companion is Oxóssi, the male orixá of the hunt and forest. Obaluaiê or Omolu is the orixá associated with infectious disease and its cure, while Osanyin is associated with leaves, herbs, and herbal knowledge. Oya is the orixá of wind and storms. Oxumaré is regarded as both male and female and is portrayed as a serpent or a rainbow. Oxum is the orixá of love, beauty, wealth and luxury, and is associated with fresh water, fish, mermaids, and butterflies. She is married to Ifa, regarded as the orixá of divination.

Tempo is the orixá of time; originating in the Angola nation, he is associated with trees. Due to the link with trees, he is sometimes equated with the Nagô orixá Loko. The orixá Exú is regarded as a capricious trickster; as the guardian of entrances, he facilitates contact between humanity and the other orixá, thus usually being honoured and fed first in any ritual. His ritual paraphernalia is often kept separate from that of other orixás, while the entrances to most terreiros will have a clay head, decorated with cowries or nails, that represents Exú and is given offerings.

The orixás are regarded as having different aspects, known as marcas ("types" or "qualities"), each of which may have an individual name. Child forms of the orixás are termed erês. They are deemed the most uncontrollable spirits of all, associated with obscenities and pranks. The child forms of orixás have specific names; the erê of Oxalá is for instance called Ebozingo ("Little Ebô") and Pombinho ("Little Dove"). The material image of an orixá is called an igbá.

==== Saints ====
Each orixá equates with a Roman Catholic saint. For instance, Omolu, an orixa of sickness, is often equated with Saint Lazarus the leper. Oxalá has been conflated with Our Lord of Bonfim, Oxum with Our Lady of the Immaculate Conception, and Ogum with St Anthony of Padua. Due to his association with time, Tempo is sometimes equated with the Christian idea of the Holy Spirit. In Candomblé altars, the orixás are often represented with images and statues of Roman Catholic saints.

This process may have begun as a subterfuge to retain the worship of African deities under European rule, although such syncretisms could have already been occurring in Africa prior to the Atlantic slave trade. From the later 20th century, some practitioners have attempted to distance the orixás from the saints as a means of re-emphasising the religion's West African origins. The anthropologist Robert A. Voeks observed that it was the priesthood and more formally educated practitioners who preferred to distinguish the orixás from the saints, whereas less formally educated adherents tended not to.

==== Relationships with the orixás ====
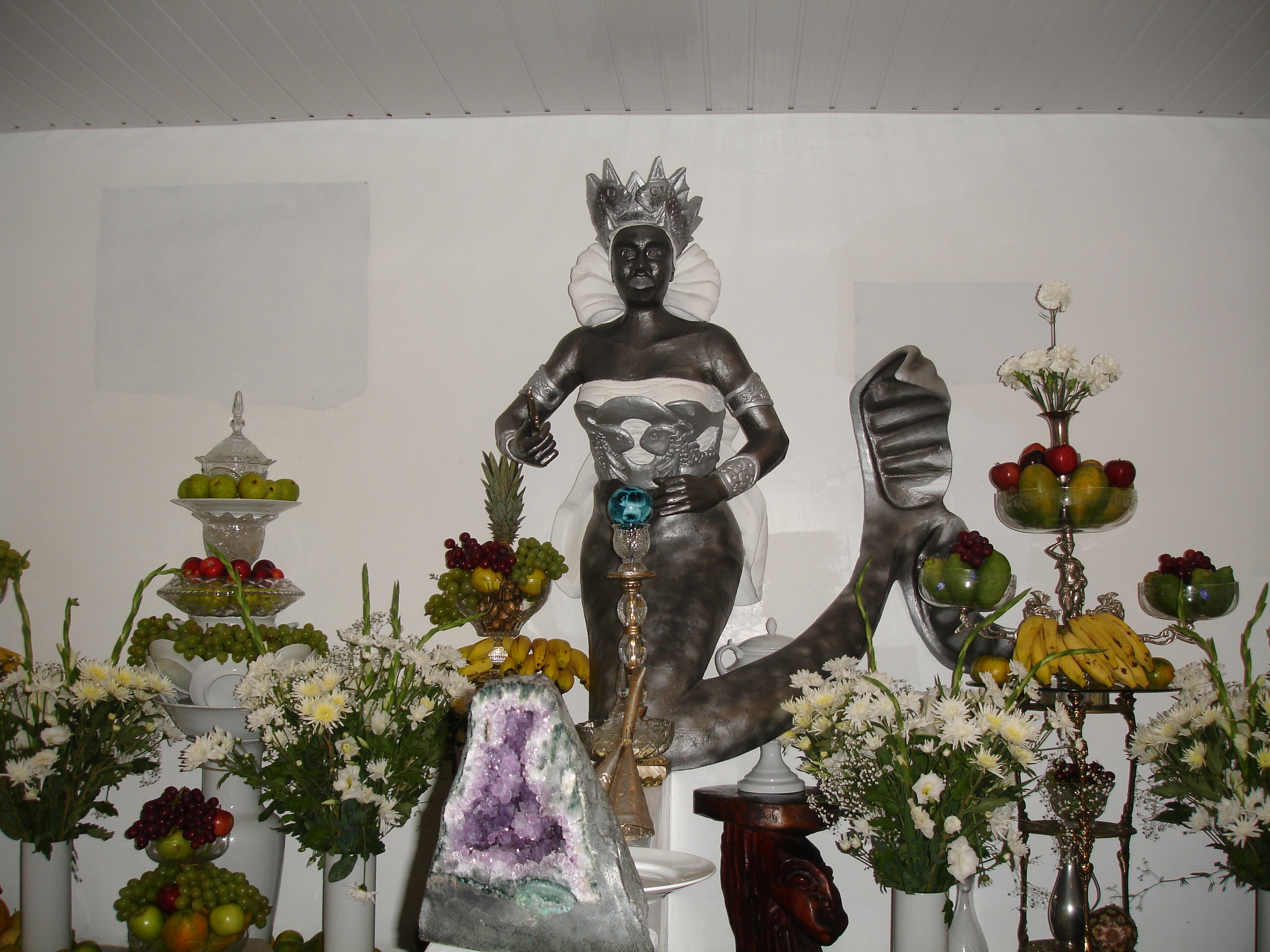
A statue of the orixá Iemanjá in Brazil, with offerings placed around it

In Candomblé, relationships are thought rooted in reciprocal obligations, and Candomblecistas see the relationship between the orixás and humanity as being one of interdependence. Practitioners seek to build harmonious relationships with the orixás, thus securing their protection.

Candomblé teaches that everyone links to a particular orixá, one that influences that individual's personality. This is their dono da cabeça: the owner or master of the person's head. The gender of this tutelary orixá is not necessarily the same as their human's.

The identity of a person's orixá can be ascertained through divination, and failing to know one's orixá is sometimes interpreted as the cause of mental illness. Depending on the orixá in question, an initiate may choose to avoid or to engage in certain activities, such as avoiding specific foods or wearing specific colours. Some practitioners also believe in further orixá linked to an individual; a second is known as the juntó, while a third is called the adjuntó, the tojuntó, or the dijuntó. Some believe that a person can also have a fourth orixá, inherited from a deceased relative.

=== Exus and caboclos ===
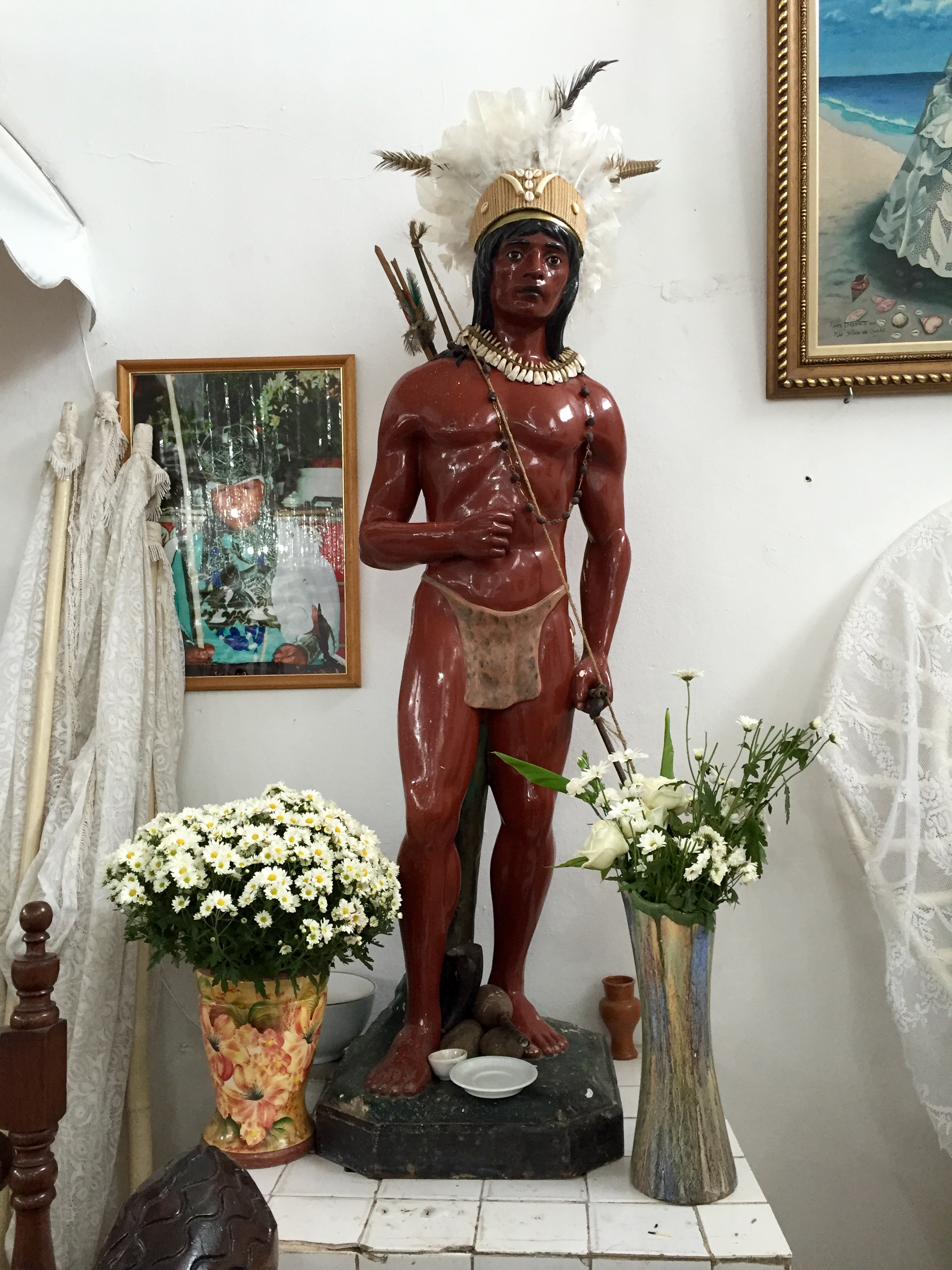
A statue inside a Candomblé terreiro in São Paulo; it depicts a Native American spirit, a caboclo

Another spirit group in the Candomblé worldview are the exus, sometimes termed exuas when female, or exu-mirims when children. Deemed closer to humanity than the orixás and thus more accessible, the exus are often regarded as the "slaves" of the orixás. In common parlance they are often described as "devils", although in Candomblé are not regarded as a force for absolute evil but rather thought capable of both good and bad acts. Practitioners believe that the exus can "open" or "close" the "roads" of fate in one's life, bringing about both help and harm. Candomblé teaches that the exus can be induced to do a practitioner's bidding, although need to be carefully controlled. The exus are recorded as having been part of Candomblé since at least the 1930s and probably arose earlier.

Also present in Candomblé are the caboclos, their name probably stemming from the Tupi language term kari'boka ("deriving from the white"). These spirits are typically those of indigenous Americans or of boiadeiros ("cowboys" or "backwoodsmen"), although in rarer cases caboclos are portrayed as being from the sea or from foreign countries. Almost exclusively male, the caboclos are believed to dwell in a forest land called Aruanda, and are characterised as smoking cigars and favoring beer.

The caboclos are particularly important in the Candomblé de Caboclo nation. This tradition has long been denigrated as inferior by other Candomblecistas, especially from the Nagô tradition. Many practitioners reject interaction with caboclos; this is the case for those who have tried to "re-Africanize" Candomblé since the late 20th century and who tend reject the caboclos as being of non-African derivation. As a result, some Candomblecistas have venerated orixás in the terreiro but only engaged with lesser spirits like the caboclos in the home. Where an individual has come to Candomblé via another Brazilian tradition like Umbanda, they are sometimes deemed to have brought caboclos or exus with them. In these instances, attempts are sometimes made to "Africanize" these spirits, ritually "seating" them in a material object, giving them an African-derived name, and then considering them a pledged slave of the orixás.

=== Birth and the dead ===
Candomblé adopts its cosmology largely from Yoruba traditional religion. The material world of humanity is called aiê (or aiye); the realm of the spirits is termed orun, and is divided into nine levels. Death is personified in the figure of Iku. A person's inner head, in which their tutelary orixá is believed to reside, is called the ori.

Spirits of the dead are called eguns. The recently deceased are termed aparacá; after they have been "educated" by receiving sacrifices they become babá. After death, the egun can enter orun, although the level they reach depends on the spiritual growth they attained in life. Sometimes, eguns will seek to help the living but inadvertently harm them; given this potential, Candomblé stresses precautions in dealing with these entities. Contact with the egun is accompanied by rituals to neutralise their harmful power or pollution. The contra-egun is an armband made of plaited raffia which is sometimes worn to ward off dead spirits. Although thought possible, possession by eguns is considered rare, and is generally discouraged by Candomblé groups, who deem it spiritually polluting, a viewpoint that distinguishes Candomblé from Umbanda.

=== Axé ===
Candomblé teaches the existence of a force called ashe or axé, a central concept in Yoruba-derived traditions. The scholar Sheila Walker described axé as "the spiritual force of the universe", and the anthropologist Joana Bahia called it "sacred force." Jim Wafer termed it "vital force", while Voeks favored "vital energy". Scholar of religion Paul Johnson characterised it as "a creative spiritual force with real material effects."

Practitioners believe axé can move, but can also concentrate in specific objects, such as leaves, roots, and specific body parts. Blood in particular is deemed to contain axé in its most concentrated form. Humans can accumulate axé, but also either lose or transfer it, with this force expressed through songs, prayers, and speech. Specific rituals and obligations are believed to maintain and enhance a person's axé, while other ritual acts are designed to attract or share this force. Dendê, a sacred palm oil used to cook ritual meals, is considered to be a materialized form of axé.

=== Morality, ethics, and gender roles ===
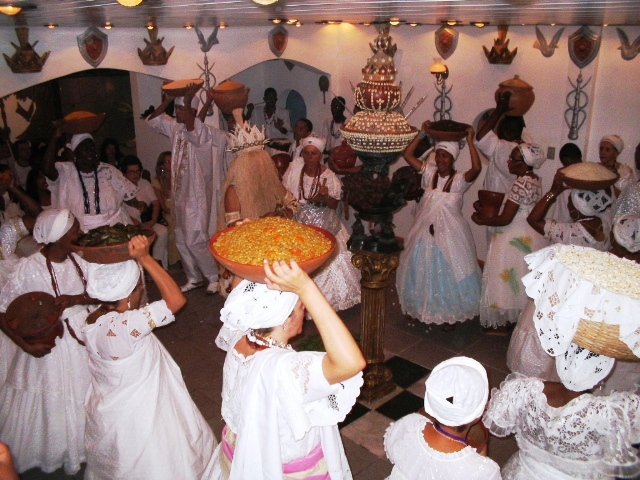
A Candomblé ritual in 2008

Candomblé generally has no fixed ethical precepts, although its teachings influence the lives of Candomblecistas. Rather than stressing a dichotomy between good and evil, emphasis is placed on achieving equilibrium between competing forces. Problems that arise in a person's life are often interpreted as resulting from a disharmony in an individual's relationship with their tutelary orixá; harmony is ensured by following the orixá's euó (taboos) regarding issues like food, drink, and colors.

Male/female polarity is a recurring theme throughout Candomblé. Many roles within the religion are gendered. For instance, animal sacrifice and the shaving of an initiate's head are usually reserved for male practitioners, while women are typically responsible for domestic duties in maintaining the ritual space. Such divisions mirror broader gender norms in Brazilian society. Restrictions are also placed on women while menstruating. However, women can still wield significant power as the heads of the terreiros; most terreiros in Bahia are led by women. Accordingly, it has been called a female-dominated religion, with scholarly debates taking place over whether it can be labelled matriarchal.

There is evidence that Candomblé is more accepting of sexual and gender non-conformity than mainstream Brazilian society. Many gay men are followers—in Rio de Janeiro many terreiros are integrated into the city's gay social network—and a pervasive stereotype associates Candomblé with gay men. Homosexuals have described the religion as a more welcoming environment than Christianity, and have cited stories of relationships between male orixás, such as Oxôssi and Ossain, as affirming same-sex attraction. Some practitioners have involved themselves in political causes including environmentalism, indigenous rights, and the Black Power movement.

== Practices ==
Candomblé is a practice-oriented religion; ritual correctness is considered more important than belief. Rituals often focus on pragmatic issues regarding prosperity, health, love, and fecundity. Those engaging in Candomblé include various initiates of varying degrees and non-initiates who may attend events and approach initiates seeking help with various problems.

Candomblé is an initiatory religion, one which is organized around a structured hierarchy based on initiatory status. Knowledge about Candomblé's beliefs and practices is referred to as the fundamentos ("foundations"), and is guarded by practitioners. It makes use of secrecy, and so Johnson has characterised it as a secret society. African-derived terms are used in ritual contexts; in general, words of Yoruba origin predominate in the Nagô nation, those from Ewe-Fon languages in Jeje nations, and words from the Bantu languages in the Angola nation.

=== Houses of worship ===
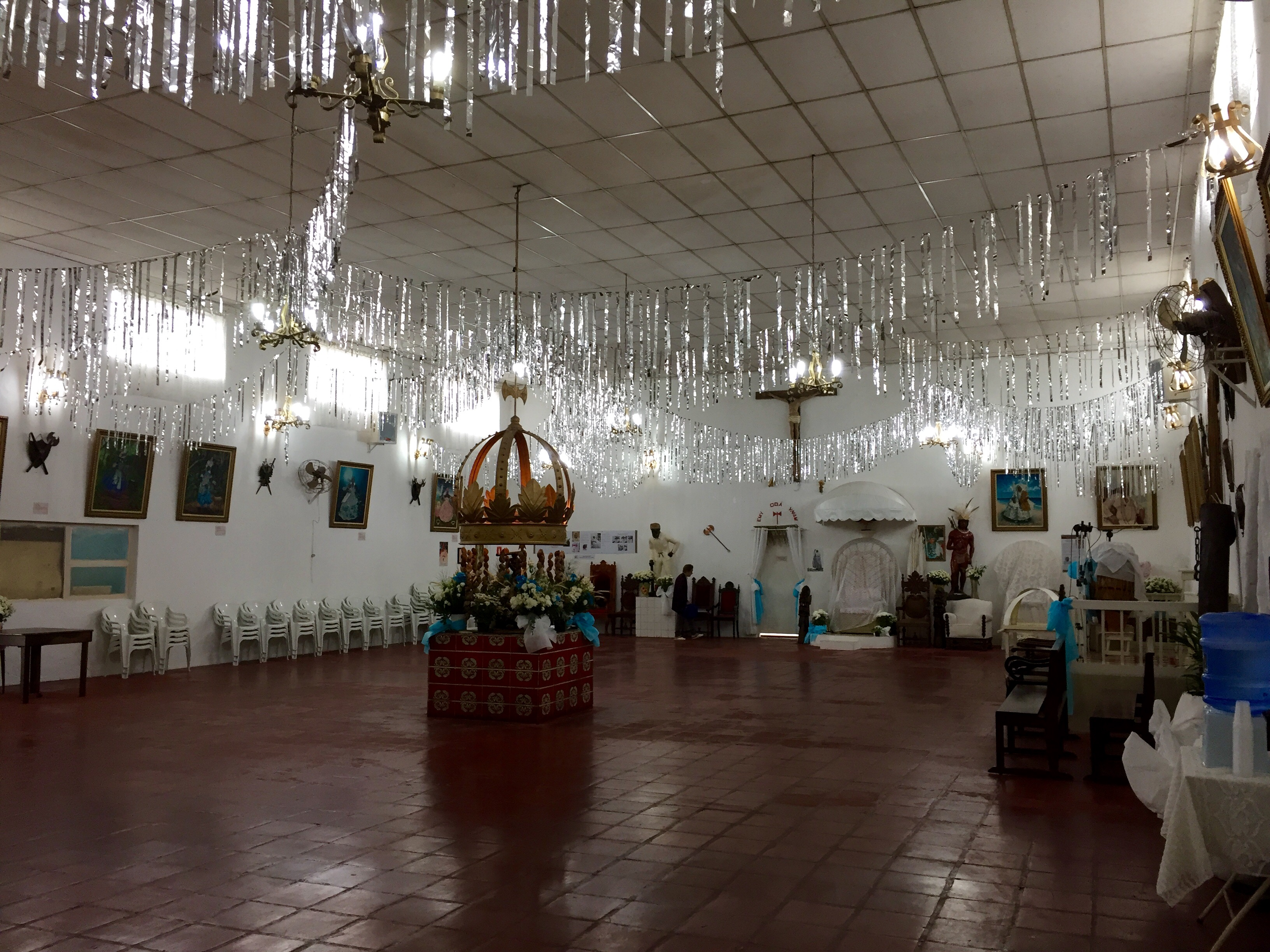
The interior of the Axé Ilê Obá terreiro in São Paulo, Brazil

Candomblé places of worship are called terreiros ("houses"), or ilês. Each terreiro is independent and operates autonomously. They range in size from small houses to large compounds, and also vary in terms of their wealth and fame. A terreiro's importance is generally regarded as being proportional to the number of initiates and clients that it has; the greater the number of initiates, the greater its own axé. Enmity often exists between terreiros, especially as they compete for members, with defection of individuals from one to another being common.

A terreiro may be concealed, so as not to attract unwanted attention. The interior consists of a series of rooms, some off-limits to non-initiates. They contain an altar to the deities, a space to perform ceremonies, and accommodation for the priests or priestesses. The bakisse is the "room of the saints", a storeroom containing both ritual paraphernalia and the assentamentos, or seated objects, of the orixás, with most terreiros offering veneration to between twelve and twenty of these spirits. Another room, the roncó ("retreat room") or camarinha, is used during initiations, while the barracão ("big shed") is where public rituals, including divination, take place. Terreiros lacking a barracão may use a yard for public rites. The peji, or shrines to deities, will often be located around the perimeter of the barracão.

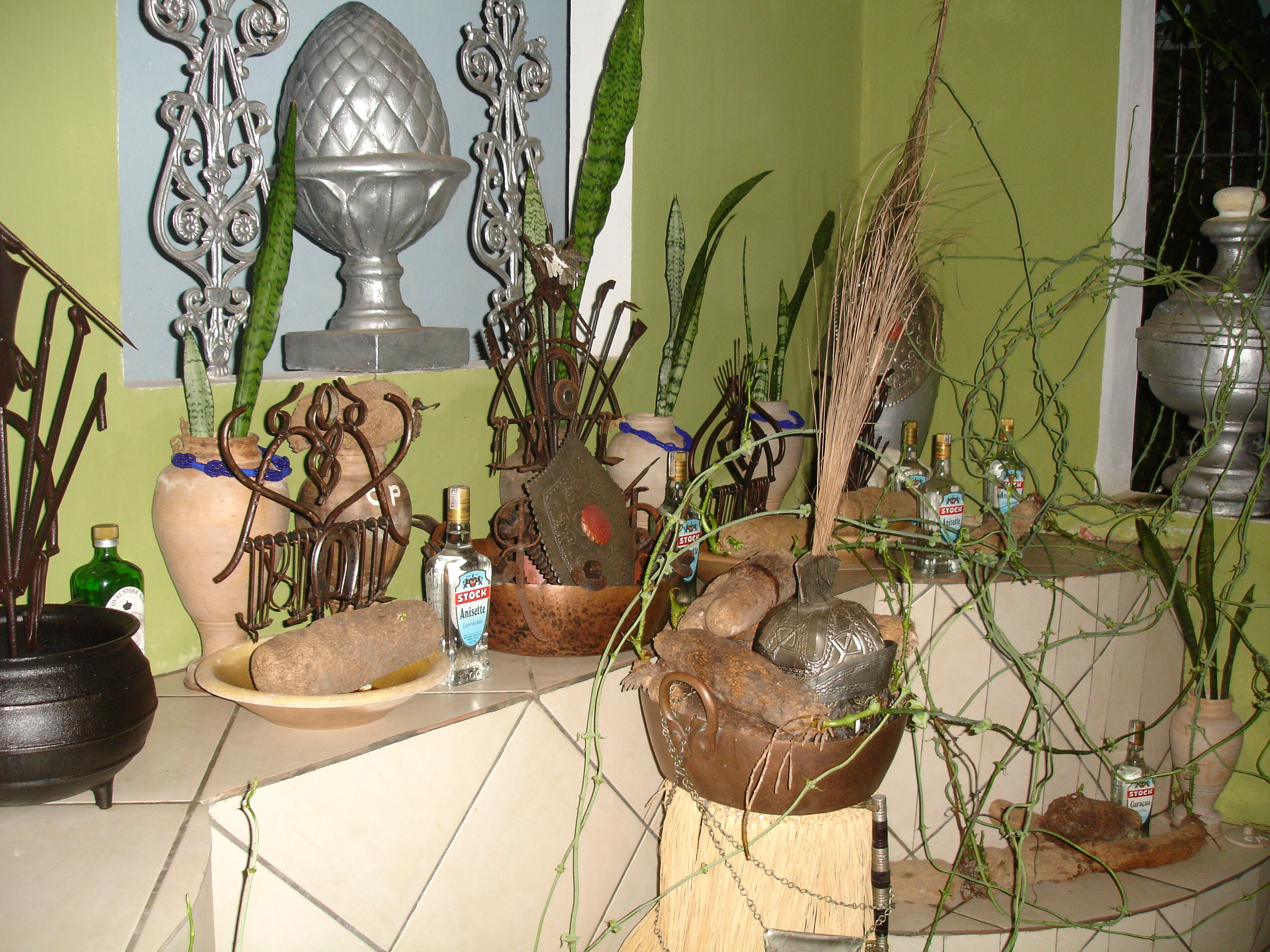
The assamentos, or sacred objects in which the orixá lives, stored in a bakisse inside a terreiro

The floor of the terreiro is deemed sacred, consecrated to the tutelary orixá of the house. The terreiro will often have a cumeeira, a central pole in the structure believed to link humanity's world with that of the orixás. This stands above the entoto ("foundation") of the terreiro, a space periodically "fed" with offerings. An outdoor enclosure may have a tree dedicated to Tempo, shrines to forest orixás like Oxossi and Ogun, and a balé, a place set aside for the souls of the dead. Plants used in rituals may also be grown in this outdoor area.

Public ceremonies take place at the terreiros where both initiates and non-initiates can attend to celebrate the orixás. Participants are expected to wear white; women wear skirts. Ceremonies often begin long after the advertised starting time. At these, food is offered to specific orixás while the rest is shared among participants, with the latter thereby gaining some of the axé of the orixás. These public rites are both preceded and succeeded by a range of private ritual acts. Most of the rituals that take place at the terreiros are private and open only to initiates. Walker believed that it was these that represented "the real core of the religious life of the Candomblé community."

==== Priesthood and congregation ====
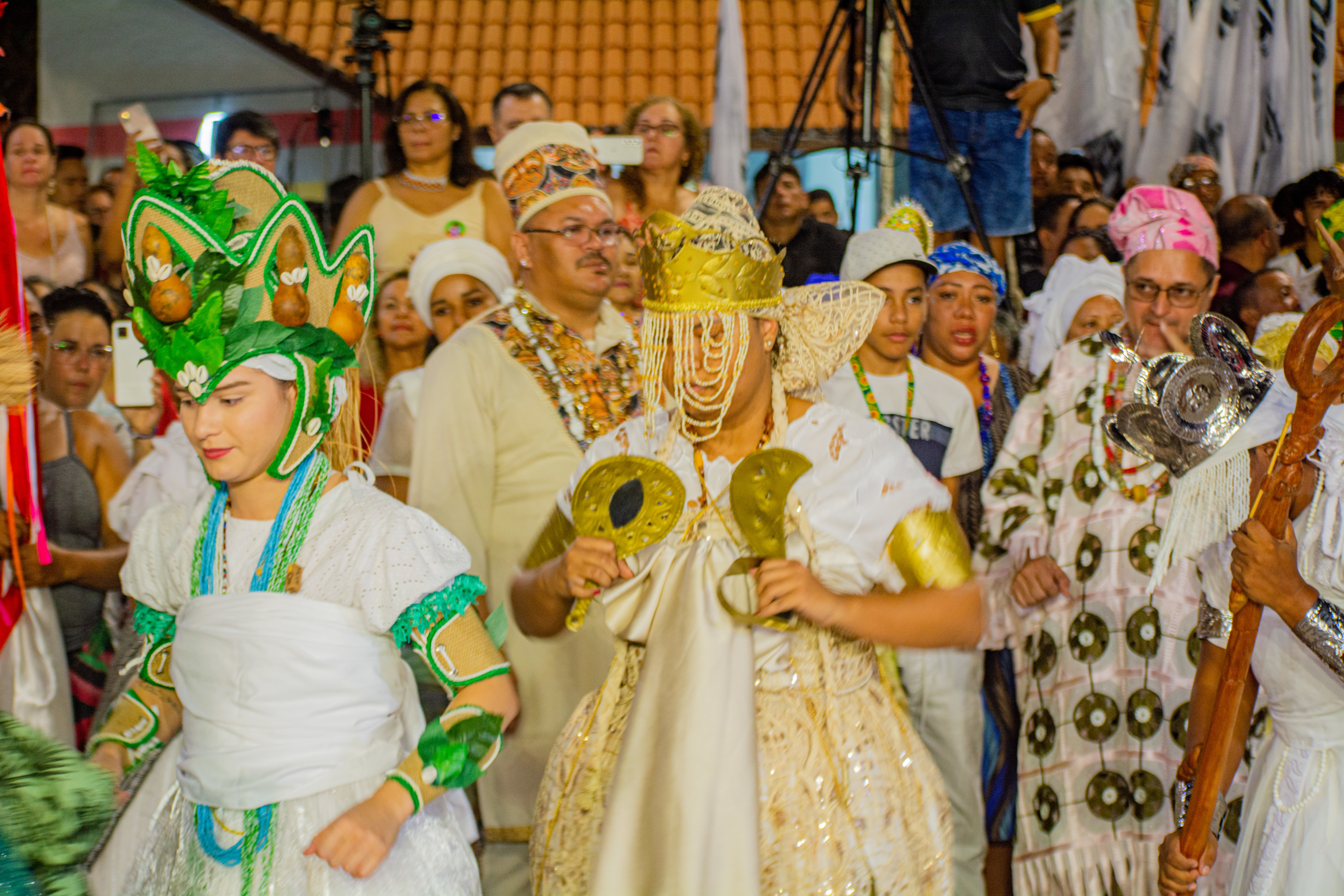
A Candomblé ritual photographed in 2023

The community of a terreiro is called an egbé. This is regarded as a "family", its initiates being "brothers" and "sisters" in the orixás (irmãos de Santo or irmãs de santo). Sexual or romantic relations between terreiro members is usually forbidden, although it does happen. Being initiated into a terreito connects an individual to the lineage of that house; this lineage is linked to the axé of the terreiro. The founders of a terreiro are called essas and their names are evoked in the padê.

A priestess running a terreiro is a mâe de santo (mother of saints); a priest who does so is a pai de santo (father of saints). Specific terms also indicate which nation a person belongs to; in Nagô Candomblé, a male priest is called a babalorixá, a female priestess an iyalorixá. Serving as intermediaries between the orixás and humanity, this priesthood is responsible for all important functions, including educating novices, adjudicating disputes, and providing healing and divination services, these latter services often being their primary income. Not constrained by external religious authorities, these "parents of saints" often exert considerable control over their initiates. The latter are expected to submit to their authority, and to prostrate before them in an act called an iká; however, conflicts between these "parents" and their initiates are common. A terreiro will often disband when its chief priest or priestess dies.

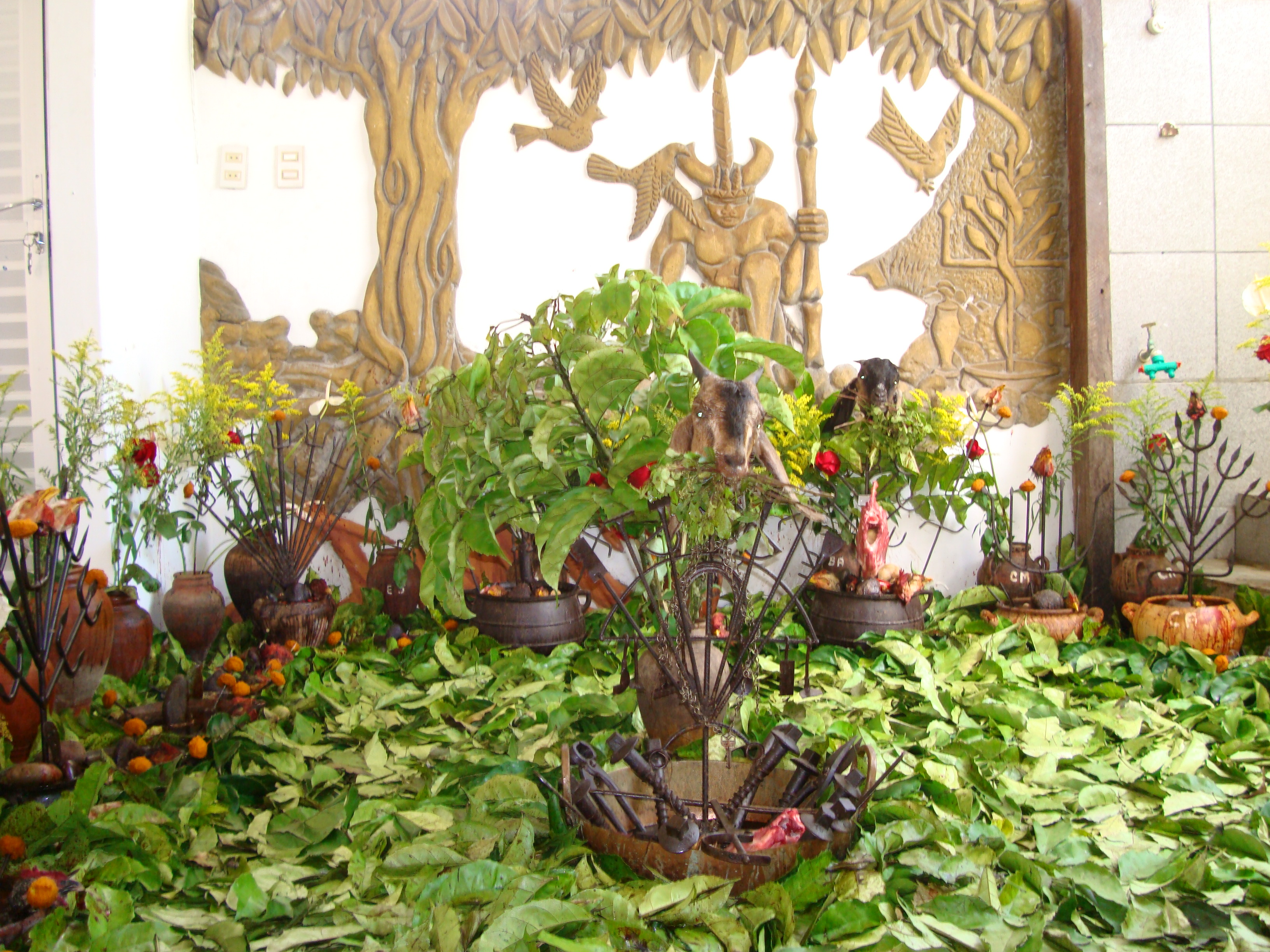
A sacrifice to the orixá Exu

Assisting the mâe or pai de Santo is the iyakekerê ("little mother") or mãe pequena, and the "little father". Other roles in the terreiro include the iyabase, who prepares food for the orixás, and the alabê (musical director). Initiates, called the filhos (sons) and filhas de santo (daughters of the saints), assist as cooks, cleaners, and gardeners. Women initiates who do not enter trance but assist those who do are called ekedi; their male counterparts are termed ogan. The ogã are male members, often not initiated, whose role is largely honorific, consisting largely of contributing financially.

An individual who has taken steps toward initiation but not yet undergone this process is termed an abiã or abian. An initiate of less than seven years is an iaô or iyawó; after seven years they may undergo the deká ceremony and thus be regarded as an ebomi, allowing them to open their own terreiro. Those who have performed seven years of initiatory rituals are called ebomi or ebame. At the end of the seven years, they "receive the decá" from their initiator, being given a tray of ritual objects; this enables them to go and form their own temple. If another such terreiro splinters off, it is believed that the axé of the mother-terreiro transfers to the new one.

=== Shrines and otás ===
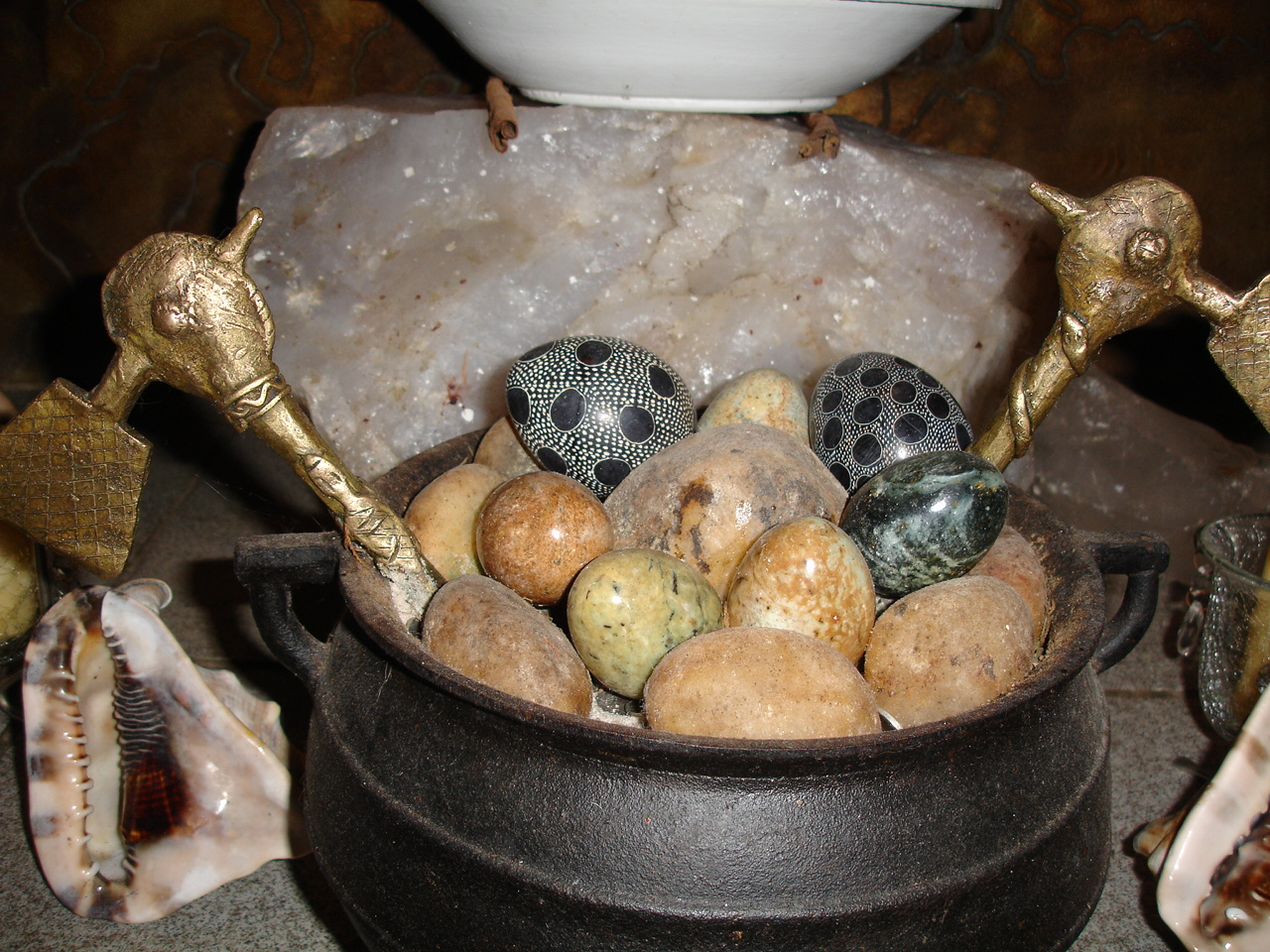
The otás, sacred stones that are central to Candomblé altars

An altar to the orixás is called a peji. It contains an assemblage of objects termed the assentamento ("seat") or assento of the orixá; this is regarded as the house of the orixá. This usually consists of various items placed within an enamel, earthenware, or wooden vessel, itself often wrapped in a cloth. The assentamento can be stored in the initiate's home, or inside the terreiro's bakisse room, which is only opened by the priestess or priest in charge. There, the assentamentos of the initiates may be arranged on a multi-level altar decorated with ribbons, colored lights, and flowers.

The key part of the assentamento is a sacred stone known as an otá. This otá possesses axé, and thus requires feeding. Each orixá is associated with a different kind of stone; those from the ocean or rivers are for instance linked to Oxum and Iemanjá, while those believed to have fallen from the sky are linked to Xangô. Practitioners are expected to find these stones, rather than buying them, after which they will be ritually consecrated, being washed, given offerings, and "seated" in their vessel. Alongside the otás, these spirit-vessels may contain ferramentos, or metal objects associated with specific orixás, cowrie shells, bracelets called idés, animal body parts, hair from the initiate who keeps it, statues of associated Roman Catholic saints, and a mix of water, honey, and herbal preparations.

Objects used in ritual are often sanctified with a herbal infusion called amaci. Ritual objects are regarded as loci and accumulators of axé, although the supply of this force needs replenishing at various intervals. For this reason, they are given blood, to feed them with new axé. In Brazil, various stores specialise in paraphernalia required in Candomblé.

=== Offerings and animal sacrifice ===
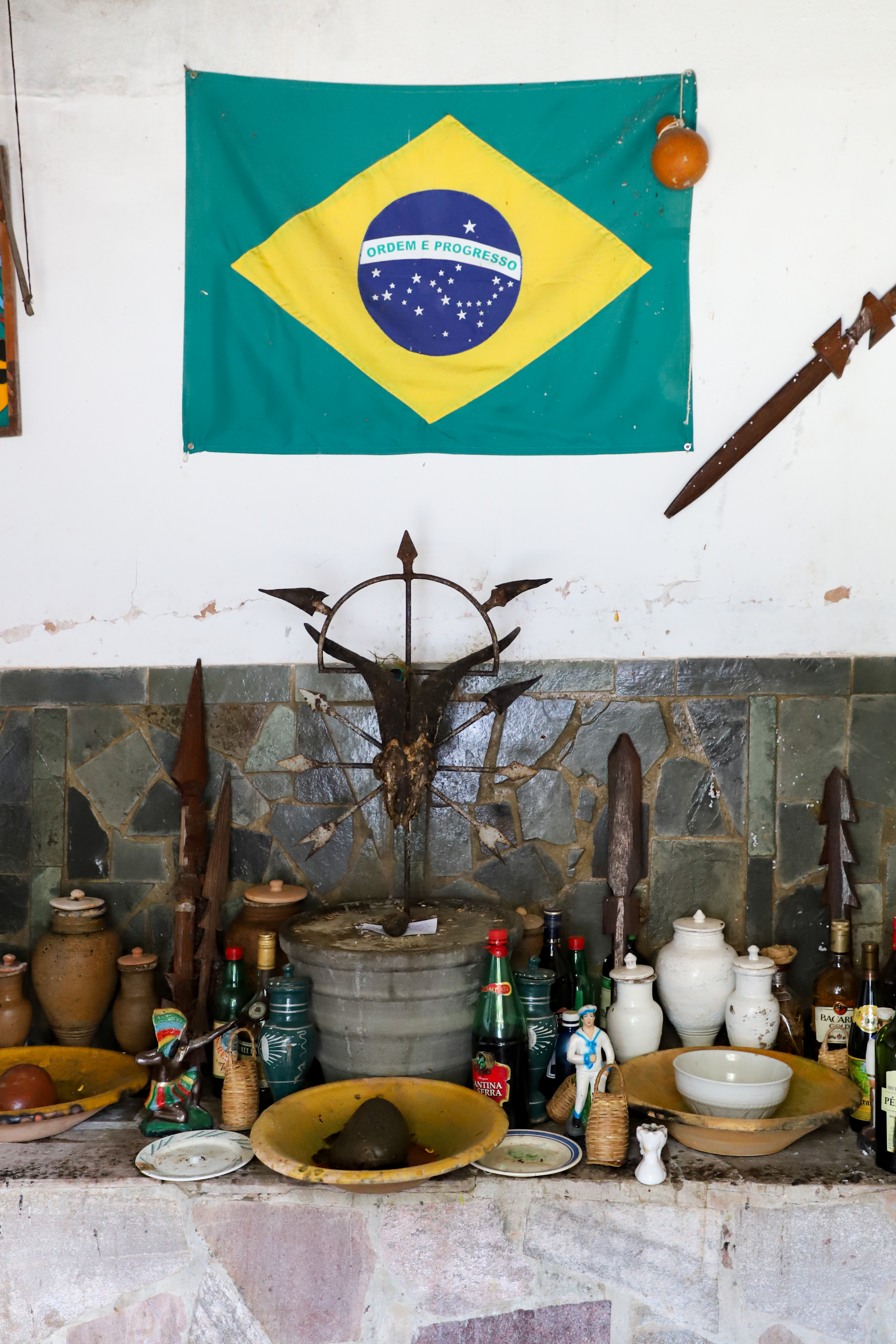
A Candomblé altar at the Ilê Axé Ibalecy in Salvador, Bahia

Offerings to spirits are known as ebós, and can consist of food, drink, fowl, and money; when animal sacrifice is not involved, a food offering is termed a comida seca. These offerings are believed to generate axé which then gives an orixá the power to aid their worshippers. When a ceremony starts, practitioners typically provide a padé, or propitiatory offering, to the orixá Exu.

As well as being offered in the terreiro, food is often placed at an appropriate landscape location; offerings to Oxum are for instance often deposited by a freshwater stream. Specific foodstuffs are associated with each orixá; a mix of okra with rice or manioc meal, known as amalá, is considered a favourite of Xangô, Obá, and Iansã. When placed in the terreiro, food is typically left in place for between one and three days, sufficient time for the orixá to consume the food's essence. The ritual payment of money, often accompanying the sacrifices, is termed dinheiro do chão ("money for the floor"). As part of this, money is placed onto the floor and often splattered with blood, before being divided among the participants of the rite.

Candomblé entails animal sacrifice, which is called matanças. The individual performing the sacrifice is known as an axogun (or axogum) or sometimes as a faca (knife). Species typically used are chickens, guinea fowl, white doves, and goats. The animal will often have its neck cut with a knife, or in the case of birds, its head severed. After the animal is killed, its blood is spilled onto the altar; its organs are often removed and placed around the "seat" of the orixá. Following the sacrifice, is it common for divination to be performed to determine if the sacrifice has been accepted. Other body parts will then be consumed by the rite's participants; the exception is if the sacrifice was for eguns, which is instead left to rot or placed in a river. Some of the food may then be taken away, to be left in the forest, thrown into a body of water, or placed at a crossroads; this is referred to as "suspending a sacrifice". Outside Brazil, practitioners have faced challenges in performing animal sacrifice; in Germany, for instance, it is banned by law.

=== Initiation ===
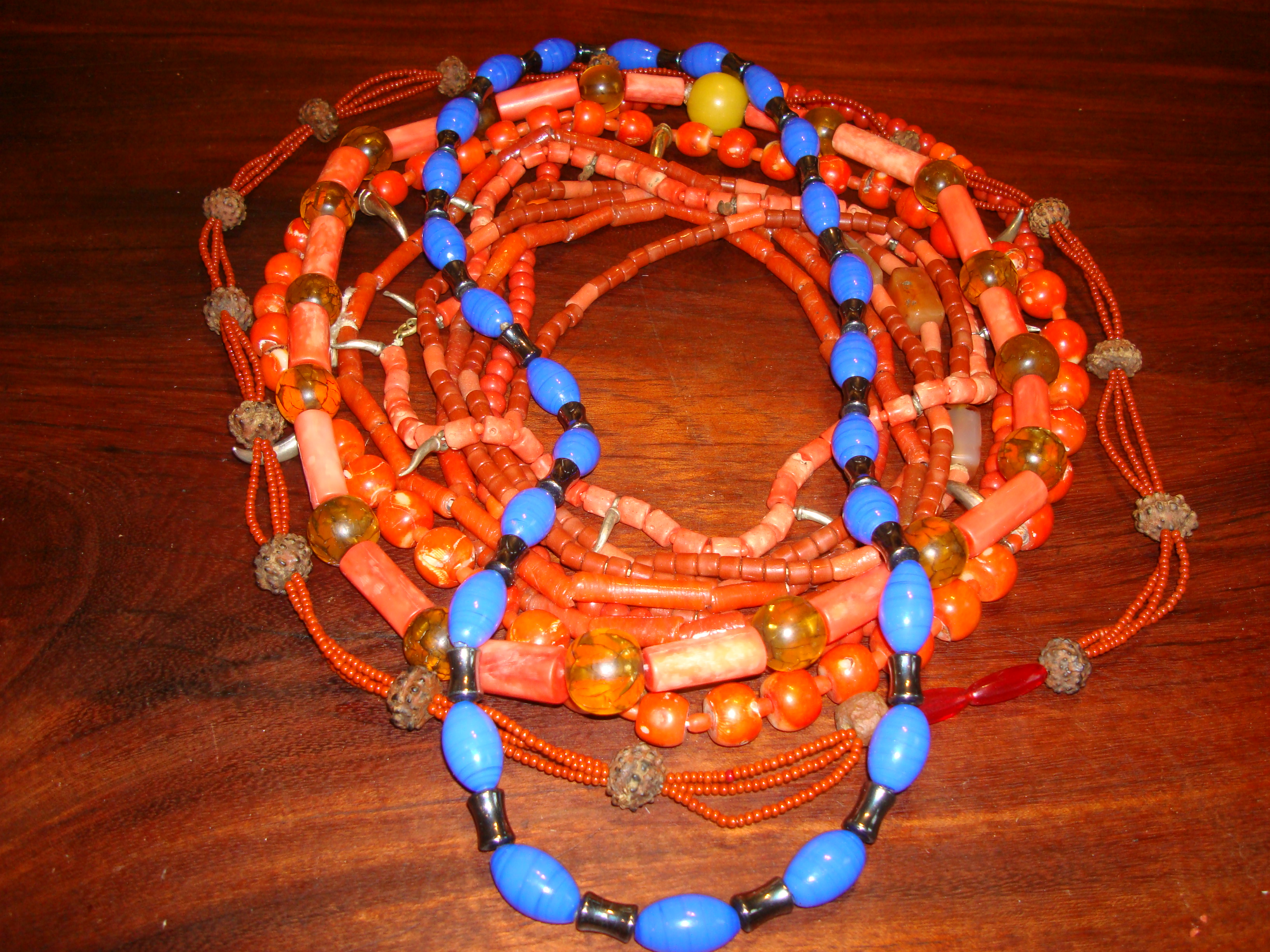
During their initiation, a person will be given a necklace associated with their tutelary orixá

Initiation is known as fazer cabeça ("to make the head") or fazer o santo ("making the saint"). This is usually very expensive. Initiates are known as filhos de santo ("children of the saints"). At their initiation, they are given a new name, the nome de santo (saint's name), which usually indicates the identity of their tutelary orixá. Many feel that an orixá has demanded their initiation, with it being their obrigação ("duty"). If a group of individuals are being initiated together, they are termed a barco ("boat").

The length of the initiatory process varies between Candomblé houses but usually lasts from a few weeks to a few months. The initiate is first brought to the terreiro, where they are left for a period of relaxation, the descanso, so that they might become "cool". They are dressed in white clothing, and they will be given a string of beads associated with their tutelary orixá. The necklace is colored according to the latter; white for Oxalá, dark blue for Ogum, or red and white for Xangô, for instance. Washed and sprinkled with the blood of a sacrificed animal, these beads are sometimes believed to protect the wearer from harm.

New initiates are secluded in a room in the terreiro called the roncô, where they sleep on a straw mat, eat only bland food, and are often forbidden to speak. During this period they are taught about their tutelary orixá, such as its likes and dislikes and its associated drum rhythms and dances. The time spent in isolation varies, although three weeks is typical. They will be bathed in water mixed with herbs, before being taken to the altar room, where drumming and singing takes place. Animals are sacrificed, including a four-legged animal, and blood may be touched on the initiate's body.

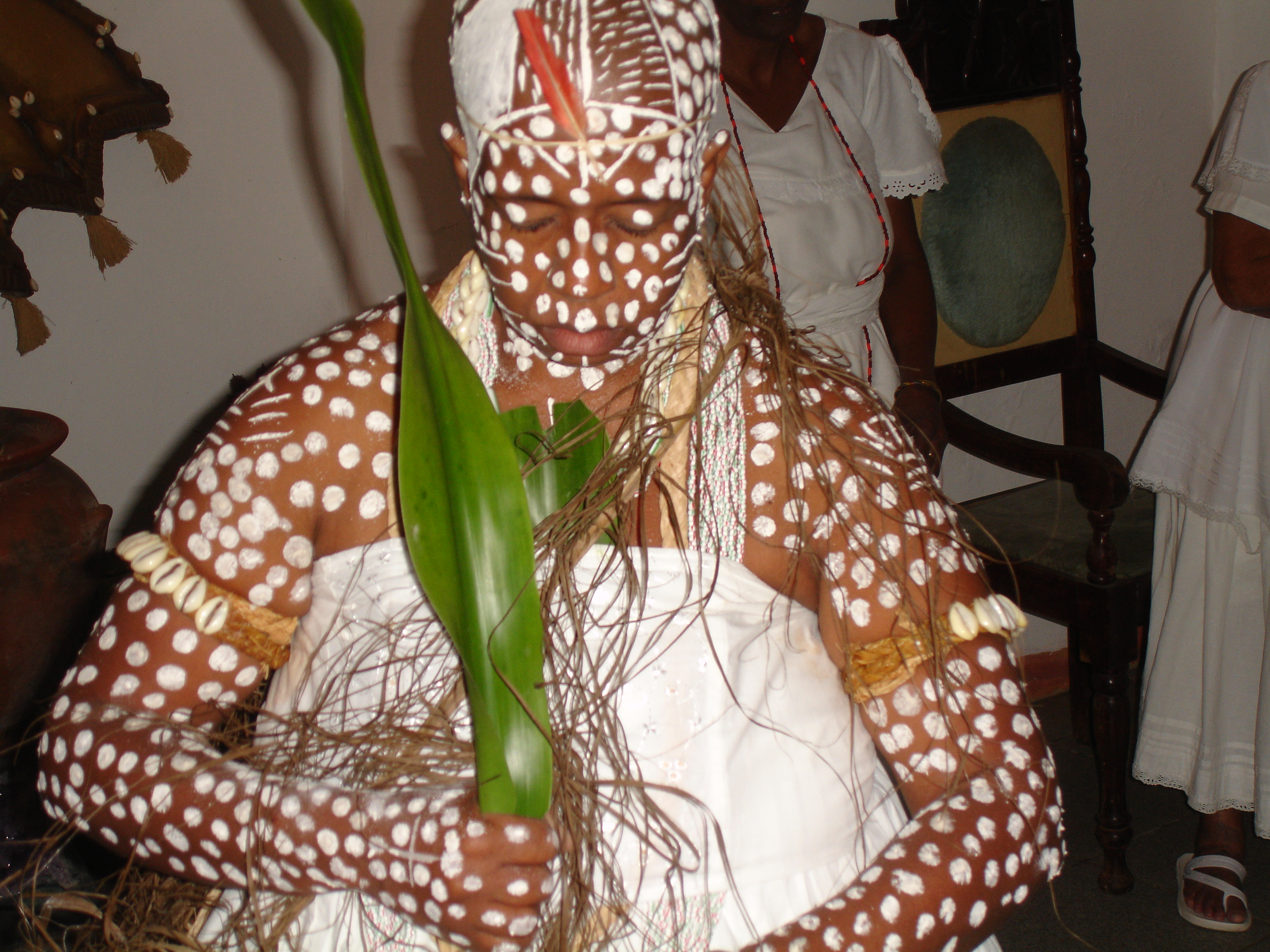
An initiation conducted in Bahia in 2008; the white clothes and white spots are worn at this ceremony

The initiate's head is then shaved and two cuts made into the apex of it with a razor, allowing the orixá entry into it; blood and herbs may be mixed into the wounds. A cone of wax, the adoxu, may be placed on the cut to stem the bleeding; the head will then be wrapped in cloth. Depending on the terreiro, cuts may also be made on the initiate's tongue, back, upper arms, thighs, buttocks, and the soles of their feet. With the incisions made, the orixá is "seated" within the individual's head during the assentar o santo ritual.

The new initiate may be presented to the rest of the community through the saida ceremony. Along with their white clothes, their body will often be covered in white spots. During this, they may be expected to give the name of the marca of their tutelary orixá, which they are supposed to have discovered via a dream. In the panán, the initiate is symbolically re-taught mundane tasks, a ritual sometimes followed by an auction in which the initiate is symbolically sold to their spouse or a member of their family, a reference to the era of slavery. On the following Friday, they attend mass in a Roman Catholic church, and finally, a senior terreiro member will lead them back to their home. Becoming an initiate implies a relationship of mutual responsibility between the individual and the orixás, with the tutelary orixá now forever inhabiting that individual's body.Over the course of the following year, the initiate may conduct further "obligations" to build their relationship with the orixá.

Candomblé includes additional, graded initiations, expected to take place one year, three years, and seven years after the original initiatory ceremony. Over the course of this they are expected to learn to receive all of their tutelary orixá. In practice, many adherents cannot afford these ceremonies at the specified time and they instead take place years after.

=== Possession ===
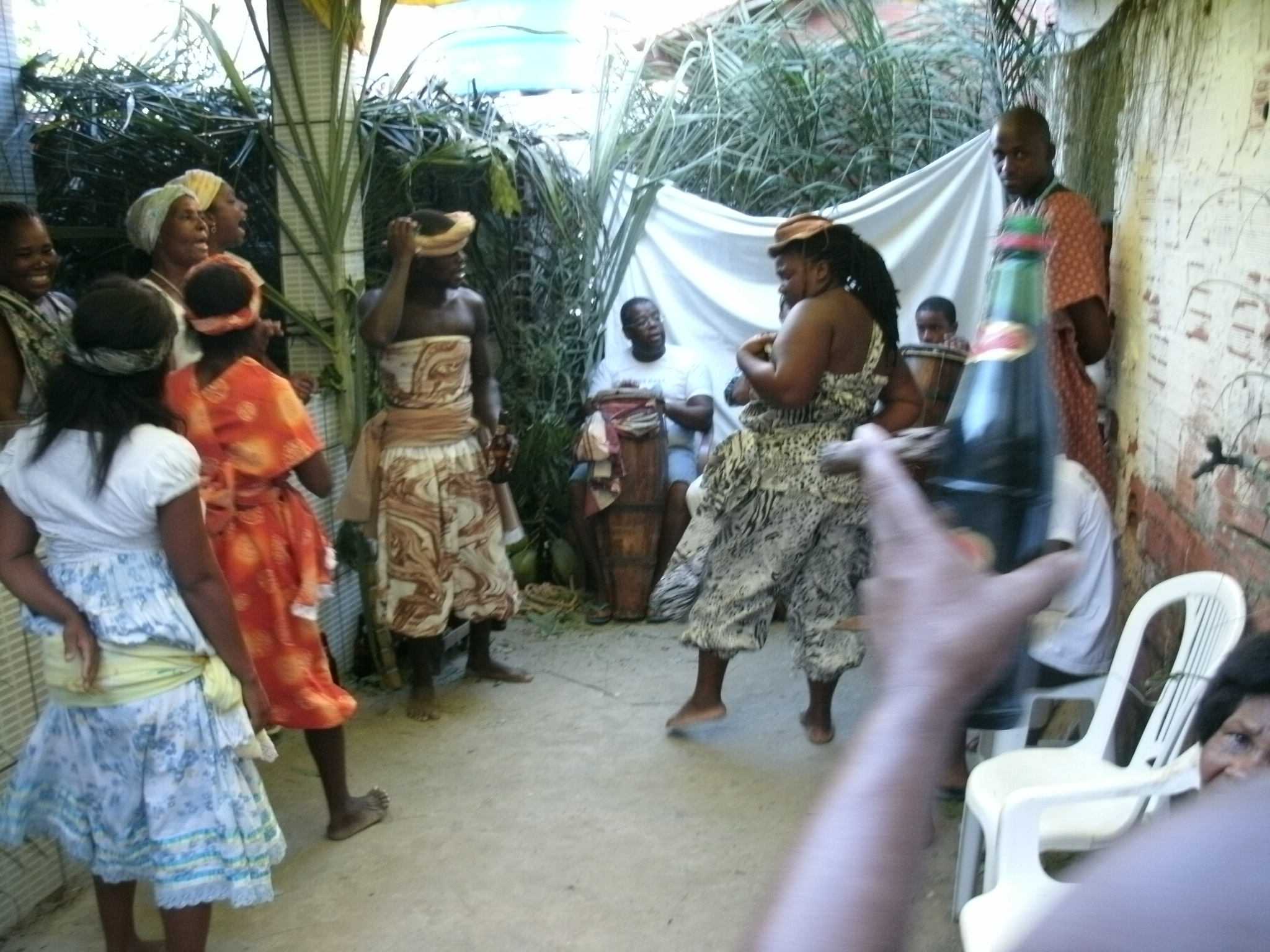
A Candomblé ceremony on Itaparica Island in Bahia

Music and dance are fundamental elements of Candomblé. The drumming will often take place all night. In the Nagô tradition, three main types of drum are employed, the largest being the rum, the middle-sized being the rumpi, and the smallest being the lé. These drums are understood as living and need to be "fed". The head drummer is the alabê. Many terreiros maintain that women should not be involved in this ritual drumming, although others reject this tradition. In some rituals, practitioners will drink a concoction containing jurema, a mildly hallucinogenic plant, sometimes mixed with the blood of sacrificed animals.

Although it is usually a dancer who becomes possessed, sometimes spectators will too. A possessed person is called a cavalo (horse); being possessed by the orixá is deemed a privilege. The state of vertigo signalling the onset of trance is known as barravento. As the trance begins, practitioners often experience a body spasm termed the arrepio ("shiver"). Practitioners believe that when an individual is possessed by a spirit, they have no control over the latter's actions. A common way of referring to the possession is receber ("to receive"). As it entails being "mounted", being possessed is regarded as being a symbolically female role, and some Candomblecistas believe that becoming a cavalo can turn a man homosexual.

Practitioners may fully prostrate themselves before the possessed; this is termed a dobalé. After an individual becomes possessed, they may be led into an anteroom to be dressed in clothes associated with the possessing orixá; this usually includes brightly colored dresses, regardless of the gender of those involved. Those possessed by Ogun are for instance often given a metal helmet and axe, while those possessed by Oxum wear a crowd and carry a sword and the abebé fan.

The style of speech adopted by the possessed will be influenced by the type of spirit believed to be possessing them. Those possessed by an orixá may rarely if ever speak, refusing to eat, drink, or smoke to emphasise their aristocratic disposition. When they dance, it will often be stylized and controlled. When they do speak, the person possessed by an orixá may deliver predictions and prophecies. Those deemed to be possessed by caboclos will often smoke cigars, while those possessed by the erês child spirits may roll around the floor and squabble. Once the possessing spirit departs, it is expected that the possessed person will have no memory of it.

=== Public festivals ===
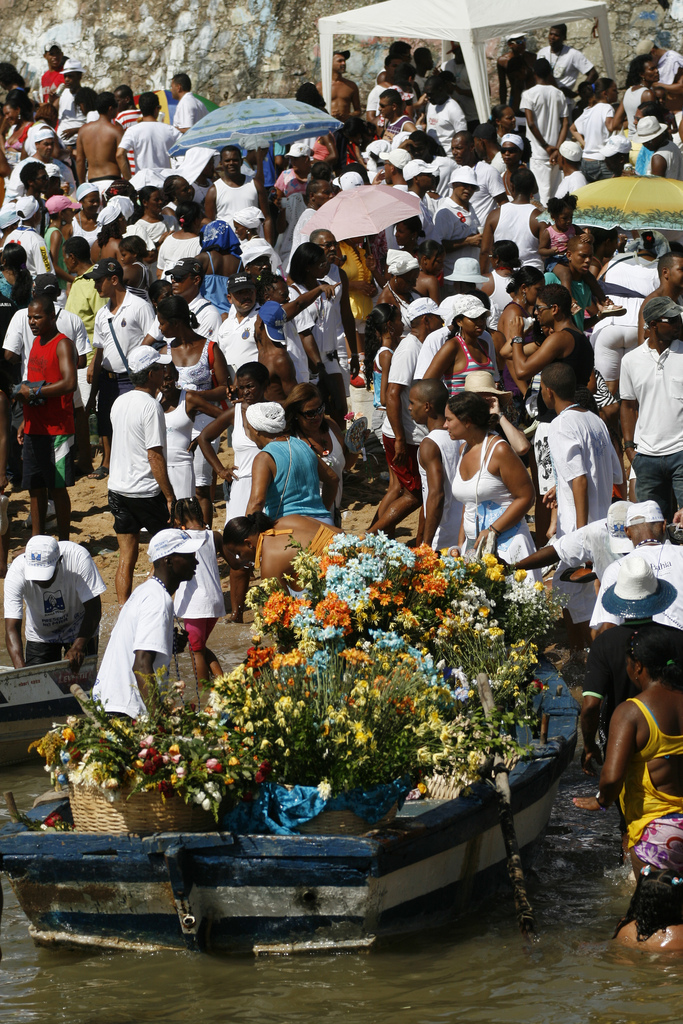
On her festival day in February, offerings to Yemanja are placed on boats and taken out to be cast into the water.

Although details of the liturgical calendar vary among terreiros, Candomblé features a yearly cycle of festivals or feasts to the orixás. These are sometimes private and sometimes open to the public. These are typically held on the Roman Catholic saint's day associated with the saint linked to a particular orixá. The main festival season begins in September, with the feast of Oxala, and continues through to February, when the feast of Iemanjá takes place. In the Nagô nation, the Waters of Oxala ritual is performed at the start of the liturgical year; it involves bringing fresh water, sometimes from a well, to the terreiro to purify and replenish the assamentos.

In some cases, Candomblé festivals have become widely popular with the public, especially those of Oxala and Iemanjá. Hundreds of thousands of people congregate at the beach on Iemanjá's Day (2 February), where they often load offerings to her onto boats, which then take them out into the water and cast them overboard.

Among terreiros that hold festivals for the caboclos, this usually happens on 2 July, the day which marks Bahia's independence from Portugal. Public festivals for exus are rarer. The tone of the event differs depending on which spirit category is being honoured; those for the orixás have more of a fixed structure and a greater formality, while those for the caboclos are more spontaneous and have greater interaction between the spirits and the human participants.

=== Divination ===
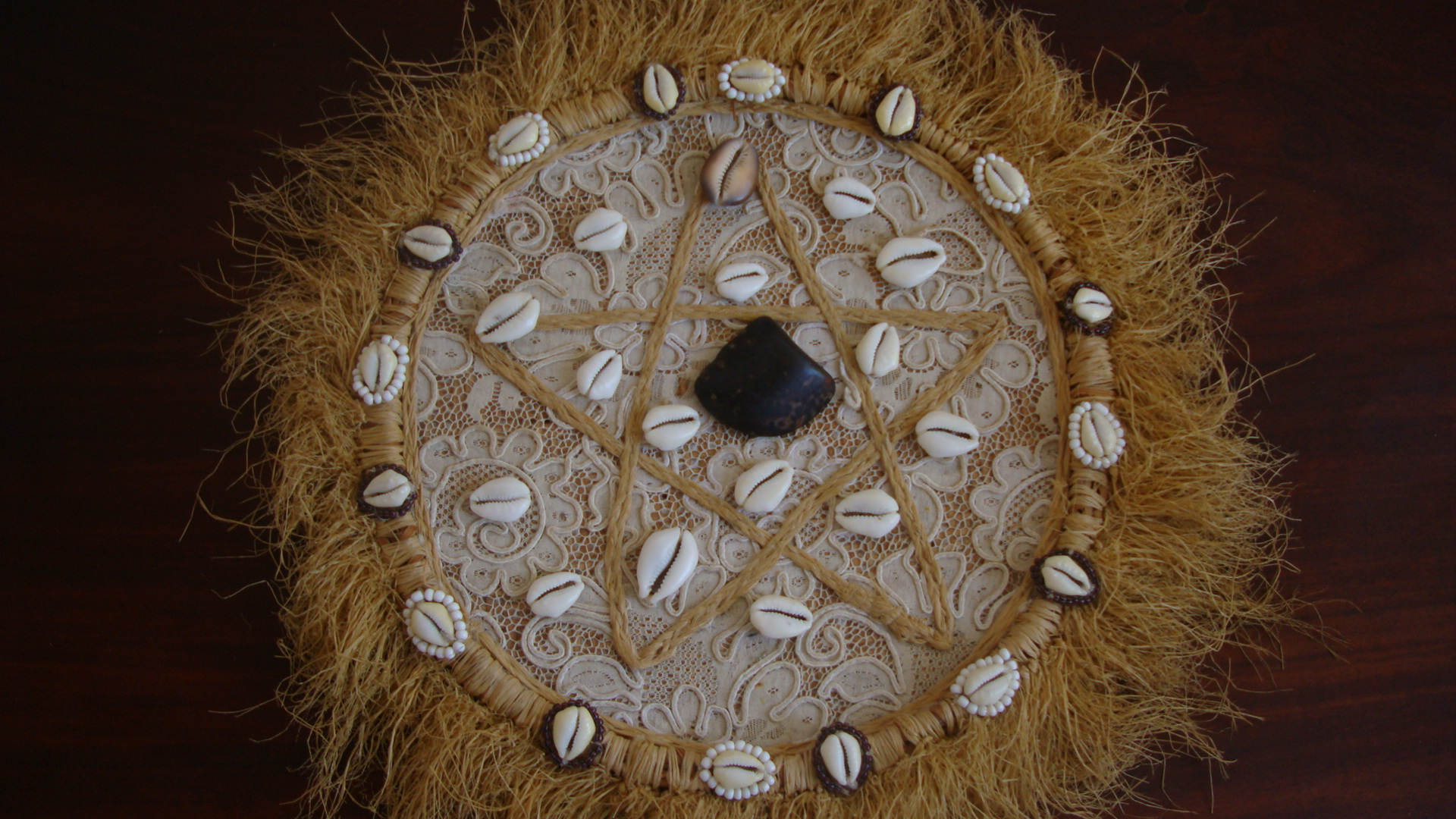
A divinatory tray used for dilogun

Initiates engage in divination, often as a key source of income.:The most common form of divination employed is the dilogun or jogo dos buzios ("shell game"), which is performed by both men and women. This entails throwing cowrie shells and drawing interpretation from their landing. 16 shells are commonly thrown, with a further four to confirm the answer provided by the first throwing. Each configuration of shells is associated with certain odu, or mythological stories, then interpreted as having pertinence for the client's situation.

Another common divinatory practice involves slicing an onion in two and dropping the pieces to the ground, drawing conclusions from the face onto which they fall; alternatively a kola nut may be cut into quarters and read in the same way. Ifá is another Yoruba divinatory system; however, by the start of the 21st century this was characterised as either extinct, or very rare in Brazil.

=== Healing and amulet practices ===
Healing forms an important part of Candomblé. Priests and priestesses may offer healing for conditions ranging from obesity and hair loss to pneumonia and cancer; in this capacity they are often called curandeiros. In the Candomblé worldview, a person's problems may be caused by their disequilibrium with the spirit world, because they are lacking in axé and thus have an "open" body vulnerable to harmful influences, or because they are being punished by orixás. Alternatively, a person may be suffering because the spirit of a deceased person has attached itself to them, or because another human has wished them ill, either inadvertently, through the mau-olhado (evil eye), or through witchcraft and cursing.

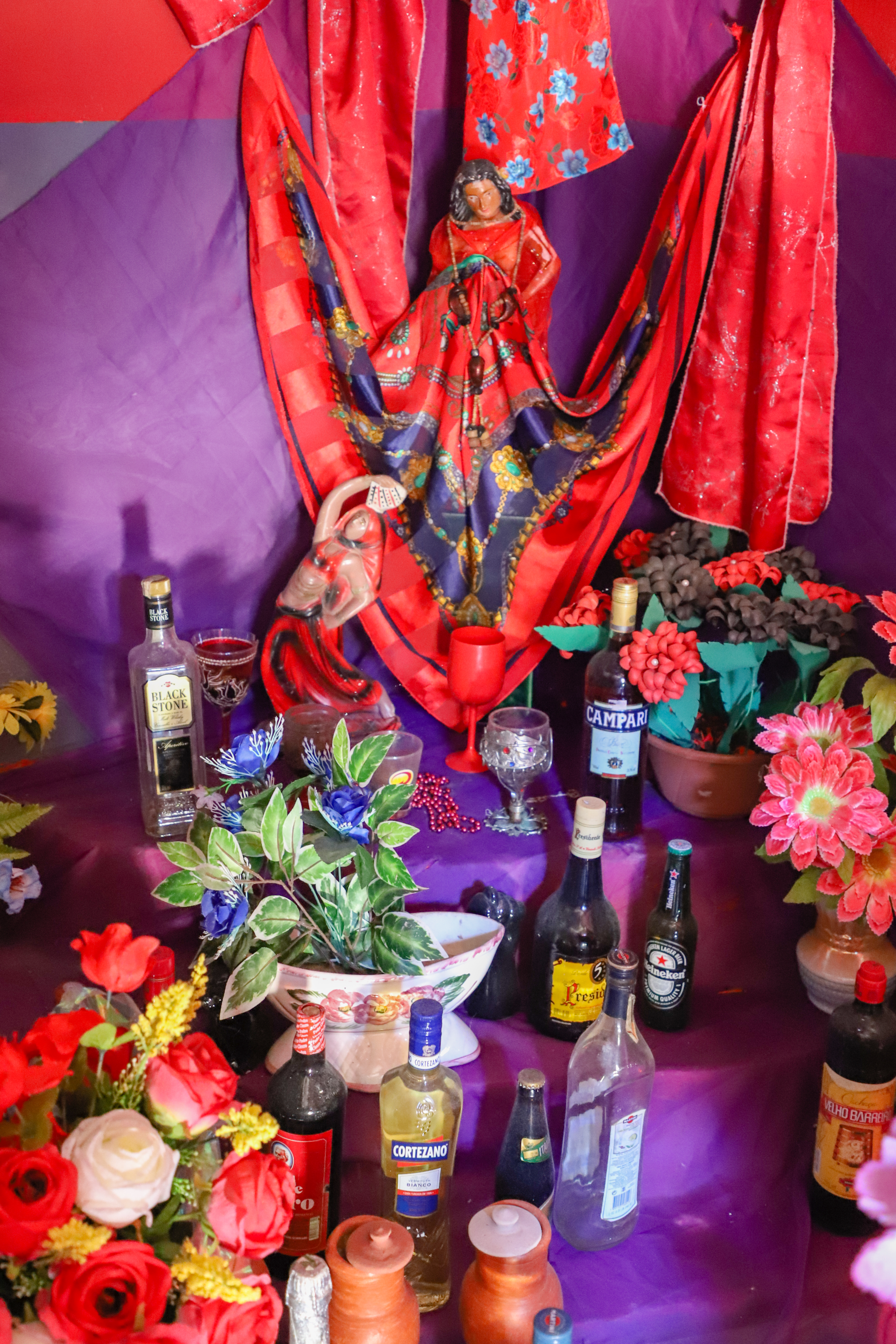
Altar at the Terreiro de Candomblé in Jiribatuba, Vera Cruz

People with a problem often approach a priest or priestess, who will then use divination to ascertain the cause and the remedy. A common first step in the healing process is the limpeza, or spiritual cleansing. This often entails an offering to a particular orixá or lesser spirit; a sacudimento (leaf whipping), whereby leaves are wiped over the patient's body; or an abô (leaf bath), during which they are washed in water infused with various herbs and other ingredients. If the individual's general health needs boosting, they may undergo the bori ceremony, in which food is placed on the patient's head to feed their tutelary orixá.

If an egum is thought to be troubling the person, they will often undergo the "cleansing of the body" rite. In the troca da cobeça rite, the sickness is transferred to another, especially a bird that may be wiped over the patient before being killed. Healing may also necessitate the patient's initiation into the religion. Staying healthy is then ensured by maintaining a state of equilibrium with the orixás, avoiding excess, and following lessons imparted in mythological tales. In addition to offering these treatments, a Candomblé healer may also recommend that the patient seek help from a medical professional.

Candomblé healers are often well versed in herbalism, in which case they may be called a mâo de ofá. Herbs are deemed to contain axé which needs to be appropriately awakened: leaves should be fresh, not dried, and picked late at night or early in the morning to ensure maximum potency. If taken from the forest, permission should be sought from the overseeing orixá and offerings left, such as coins, honey, or tobacco; alternatively, healers often purchase them from the casas de folhas ("houses of leaves") in markets. Leaves may then be rubbed directly on the patient or brewed into a tea or other medicinal concoction; practitioners may also produce pó (powder), which may have a variety of uses, from healing to harming or attracting someone's romantic attention.

Candomblecistas often wear amulets. Common examples include horns or the figa, a fist with the thumb in inserted between the index and middle finger. A patuá consists of a small cloth pouch containing various objects, plant parts, and texts. Sprigs of the arruda or laranja-da-terra plants may also be carried to protect against the evil eye. Specific plants, associated with a particular orixá, are often kept by doorways to prevent the entry of negative forces.

=== Funerals and the dead ===
Following a senior initiate's death, their terreiro will conduct the axexé rituals; these transform the deceased into an ancestral spirit of the terreiro's own pantheon and ensures the dead person does not become a dangerous wandering spirit. Offerings, including sacrificed animals, are given to the deceased and to accompanying orixás during the axexé. A Roman Catholic mass will also be performed.

== History ==
=== Origins ===
Slavery was widespread in West Africa; most slaves were prisoners of war captured in conflicts with neighbouring groups, others were criminals or those in debt. Enslaved Africans first arrived in Brazil in the 1530s. These 16th-century arrivals came largely from the Guinea coast, but by the 17th century Angola and Congo populations had become dominant. Then, between 1775 and 1850, the majority of slaves were Yoruba and Dahomean, coming from the Gulf of Benin, largely in what is now Benin and Nigeria. After declaring itself independent from Portugal in 1822, Brazil abolished the slave trade in 1850, and then emancipated all slaves in 1888. In total, around four million Africans were transported to Brazil, more than to any other part of the Americas. In Brazil, they were concentrated predominantly in Bahia.

On arriving in Brazil, slaves were divided into "nations" based largely on their port of embarkation. This meant that Africans of different cultural backgrounds, regions, and religions were included together under a unifying term; those from the Bight of Benin were for instance called "Nagô". As the Yoruba and Dahomean people made up the last wave of slaves, they became numerically dominant among Afro-Brazilians and their traditional cosmology became ascendant over that of longer established communities. The process of enslavement broke up the traditional links between African deities and specific regions, while also mixing deities from different peoples into a singular pantheon. Of the thousands of orishas venerated in West Africa, far fewer continued to be worshipped in Brazil; orisha associated with agriculture were abandoned, for instance, as slaves had little reason to protect the harvests of slave-owners. By the 18th century, accounts of African-derived rituals performed in Brazil were common, at which point they were referred to generically as calundu, a term of Bantu origin.

In colonial Brazil, enslaved Africans were expected to give up their traditional religions for Roman Catholicism. The Roman Catholic nature of Brazilian colonial society, which allowed for a cult of saints, may have permitted greater leeway for the survival of traditional African religions than were available in Protestant-dominant areas of the Americas. Many of the slaves learned to classify their orixás in relation to the Roman Catholic saints and the calendar of saints' days. There is no evidence that the slaves simply used the cult of saints to conceal orixá worship, but rather that devotees understood the two pantheons as comprising similar figures with similar abilities to fix certain problems. Some in the Roman Catholic Church saw the syncretisation as a positive step in the process of converting the Africans to Christianity. The Christian teaching provided to enslaved Africans was often rudimentary. Slave owners often believed that allowing the slaves to keep their traditional customs would expend energies that might otherwise be directed toward rebellion.

=== Formation and early history ===
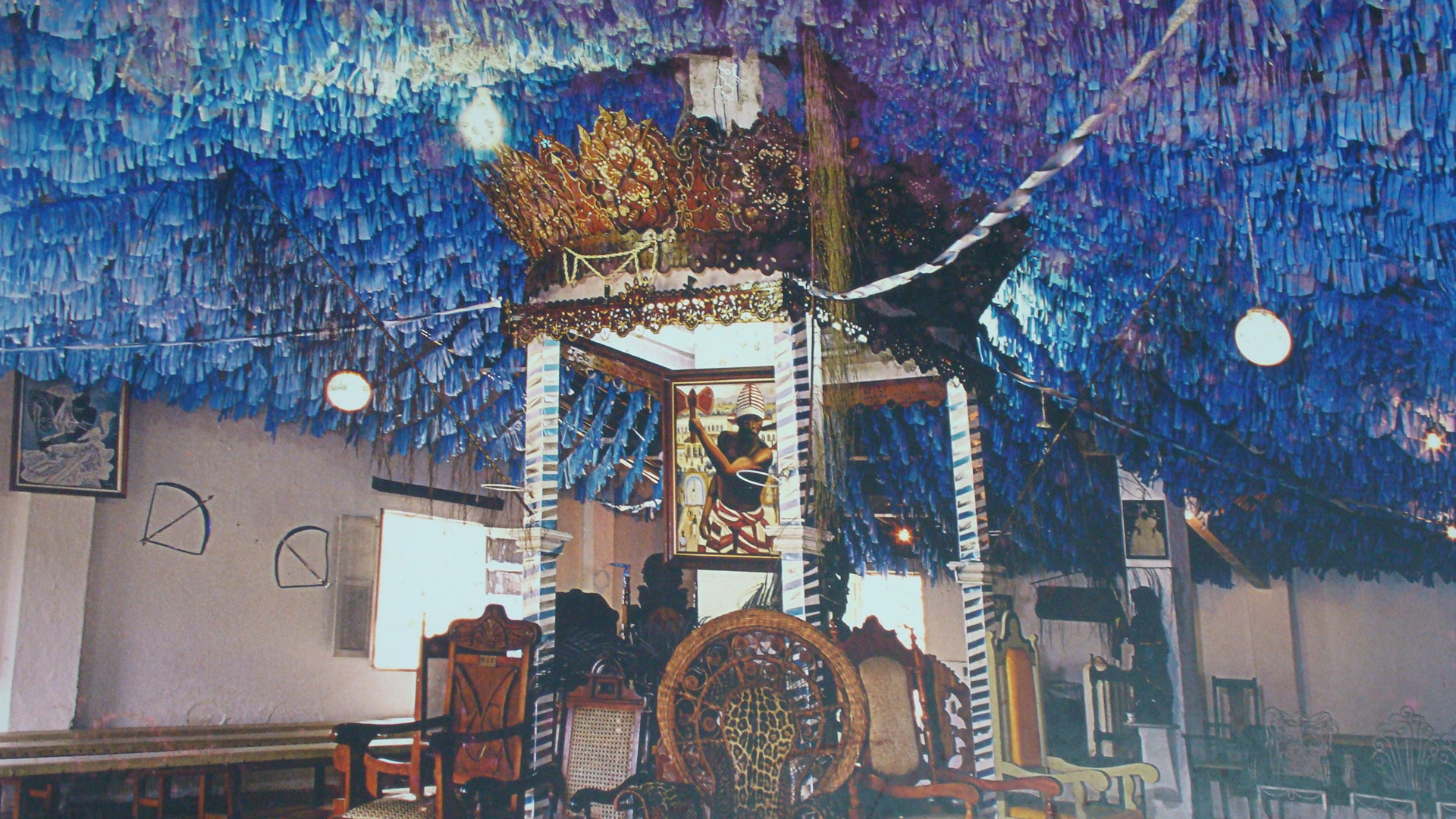
The interior of the Ilê Axé Iyá Nassô Oká in Salvador, as photographed in 2008; according to tradition, it is the oldest Candomblé terreiro, founded in 1830

Although African religions had been present in Brazil since the 16th century, the "organized, structured liturgy and community of practice called Candomblé" only arose later. The earliest terreiros appeared in Bahia in the early 19th century. According to what the scholar Stefania Capone called "the founding myth of Candomblé", the first terreiro was the Ilê Axé Iyá Nassô Oká (also known as the Casa Branca or Engenho Velho), founded in Salvador in 1830, and from which the Nagô tradition descends.

Various emancipated Yoruba began trading between Brazil and West Africa, and a significant role in the creation of Candomblé were several African freemen who were affluent and sent their children to be educated in Lagos.

Brazil's republican Constitution of 1891 enshrined freedom of religion. However, Afro-Brazilian religious traditions continued to face legal issues; the Penal Code of 1890 included prohibitions on Spiritism, talismans, and much herbal medicine, impacting Candomblé. The authorities continued to shut down terreiros, claiming they were a threat to public health. The late 19th century saw the first terreiros open in Rio de Janeiro, a city then seeing a rapid expansion in its population. The period also saw various upper-class white Brazilians seeking out Candomblé.

=== 20th and 21st centuries ===
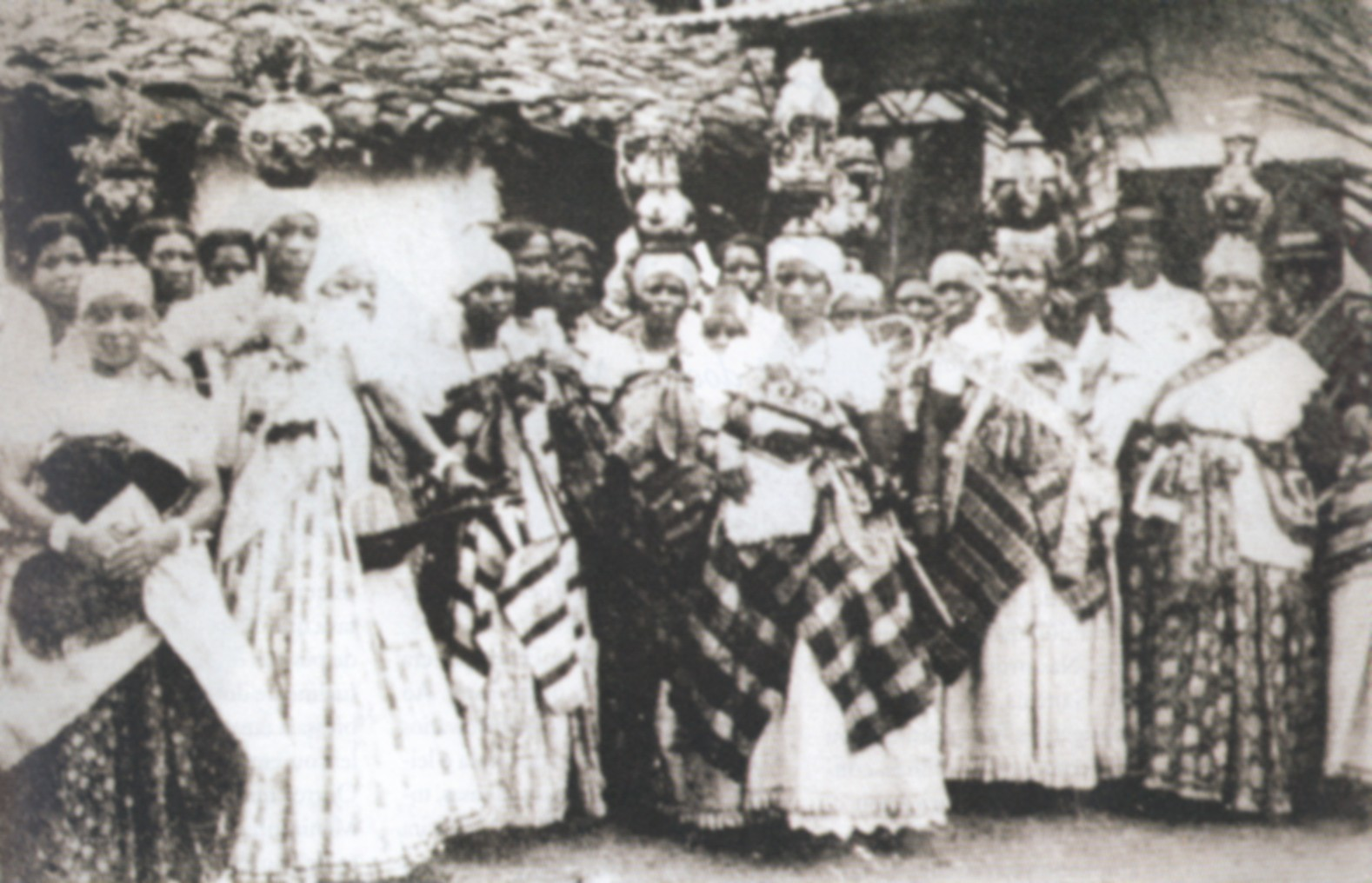
A group of practitioners photographed in 1902

Candomblé became increasingly public in the 1930s, partly because Brazilians were increasingly encouraged to perceive themselves as part of a multi-racial, mixed society in the midst of President Getúlio Vargas' Estado Novo project. Vargas' Law Decree 1202 recognized the legitimacy of terreiros, while the Penal Code of 1940 offered them additional protections. The 1930s saw a proliferation of academic studies on Candomblé by scholars like Raimundo Nina Rodrigues, Edison Carneiro, and Ruth Landes, most focusing on the Nagô tradition. The growing literature, both scholarly and popular, helped document Candomblé while contributing to its greater standardisation.

The religion spread during the 20th century. Growing Afro-Brazilian migration to São Paulo brought the rapid rise of Candomblé there; from virtually no terreiros until the 1960s, it had over 4000 by the century's end. Some practitioners became increasingly well known; the priestess Mãe Menininha do Gantois became nationally recognised. Various organizations emerged to represent the terreiros, notably the Bahian Federation of the Afro-Brazilian Cults, the National Institute and Supreme Sacerdotal Organ of Afro-Brazilian Culture and Tradition, and the Conference of the Tradition and Culture of the Orixás. Candomblé federations emerged in most Brazilian states, representing practitioners in their dealings with the government and society more broadly.

Growing links were also established with other African diasporic and West African religions. Brazilians took part in the first International Congress of Orisha Tradition and Culture in Ifẹ, Nigeria in 1981; the second was held in Salvador in 1983. The late 20th century saw some practitioners—most famously Mãe Stella Azevedo—try to "re-Africanise" Candomblé by removing Roman Catholic elements. This was an effort to attract prestige, and proved popular among white middle-class practitioners who had little standing with the predominantly Afro-Brazilian Bahian Candomblé establishment. Other practitioners rejected this approach, deeming Roman Catholic influences an important part of Candomblé.

Candomblé was increasingly respectable by the late 20th century, a situation fuelled by well-educated Afro-Brazilians embracing their cultural heritage, by increased Brazilian trade with West Africa, and by the growing number of intellectual and white initiates. By the early 21st century, tourist literature increasingly portrayed Candomblé as an intrinsic part of Brazilian culture; Varig Airlines used the tagline "Fly with Axé." Conversely, the 2000s saw growing Evangelical Protestant opposition, including physical attacks on practitioners and terreiros, to which Candomblecistas responded with protest marches.

== Demographics ==
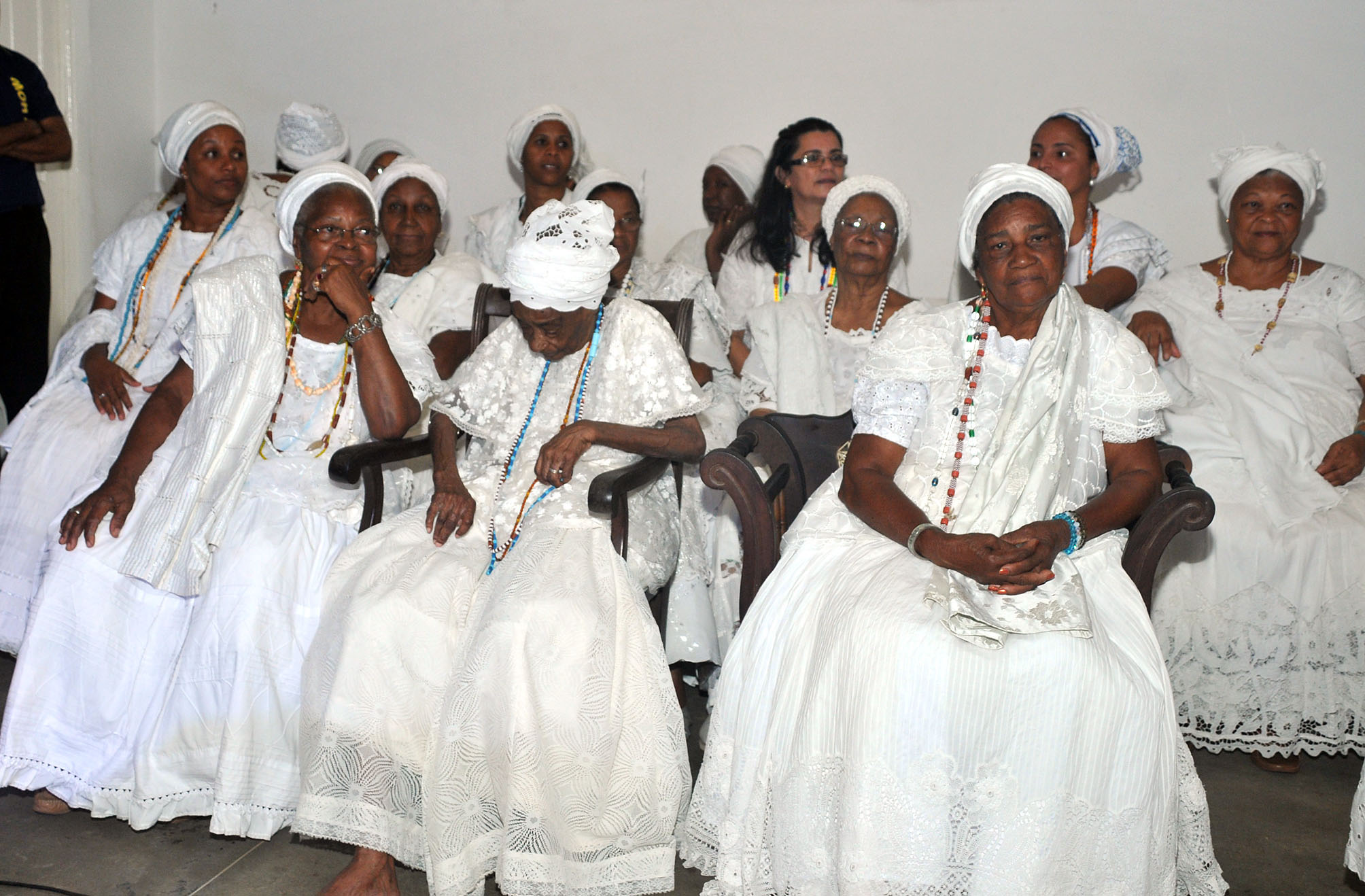
A gathering of practitioners at the Terreiro de São Gonçalo do Retiro in Salvador in 2010

One census report indicated that around 1.3 percent of Brazil's population identified as Candomblé followers. This likely reflects only the number of initiates, with a larger body of non-initiates sometimes attending ceremonies or consulting initiates for healing and other services.

Candomblé is centred largely in and around the city of Salvador, sometimes referred to as "Black Rome," and regarded by some followers as a holy city. A 1997 census by the Bahian Federation of Afro-Brazilian Religions recorded 1,144 terreiros in Salvador. Practitioners in Rio de Janeiro and Sâo Paulo often regard Bahian terreiros as being more authentic. Candomblé has also spread to other parts of South America like Argentina and Uruguay, as well as to European countries like Portugal, Spain, France, Belgium, Germany, and Italy.

In Brazil, Candomblé is a largely urban phenomenon, generally found among the poor, with most followers being black women. Membership is more diverse in southern Brazil, where there are large numbers of white and middle-class followers; there are also followers among Brazil's Japanese minority. Women predominate in the Ketu nation, although men dominate the Angola and Jeje nations.

Many Candomblecistas have a family link to the tradition, with their parents or other relatives being initiates. Others convert to the movement without such connections, sometimes having already explored Pentecostalism, Spiritism, or Umbanda; some Umbandistas feel that they can go "deeper" by moving towards Candomblé. Many describe having been ill or plagued with misfortune prior to being initiated into Candomblé, having determined through divination that their ailments would cease if they did so. It has been argued that Candomblé offers a sense of empowerment to the socially marginalised, and has appeal for those who identify strongly with an African heritage; some black people in Germany, for instance, have been attracted to it because they feel it is more authentically African than Christianity or Islam.

== Reception and influence ==
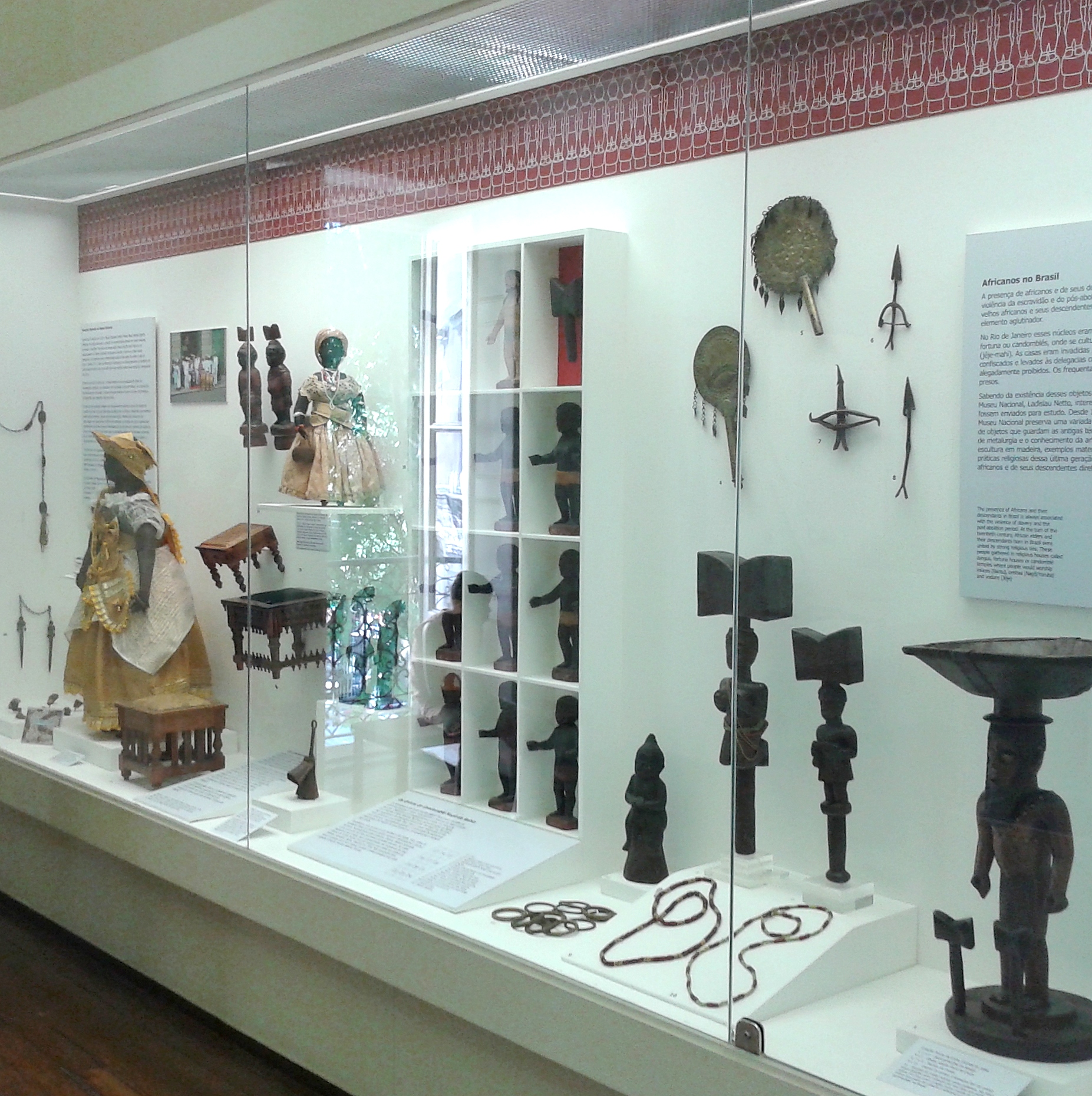
Objects pertaining to Candomblé on display in a Brazilian museum

Candomblé has been described as a much maligned religion. Practitioners have often encountered intolerance and religious discrimination: their religion is given the negative label macumba, terreiro leaders are often stereotyped as greedy and conniving, and terreiros have been attacked. In some isolated cases, terreiro leaders have been accused and/or arrested following accusations of emotional and psychological abuse, financial exploitation, rape, and harassment. However, the isolated controversies cannot be considered a generalization.

More extreme hostile views of Candomblé have regarded it as devil worship, while milder critical views see it as superstition that attracts the simple-minded and desperate. Brazil's Roman Catholics have mixed opinions of Candomblé and the attendance of its practitioners at mass, while evangelical and Pentecostal groups more uniformly target Candomblecistas as part of their "spiritual war" against Satan.

Candomblé has elsewhere been seen as "a treasured symbol of Brazilian cultural identity and an icon of African Diaspora culture and politics". Various academics have sought to portray it in the best light possible to counter racist stereotypes about Afro-Brazilians. Academic studies have in turn influenced the way that the religion is practiced, helping to establish "correct practice" among divergent groups; many terreiros own copies of academic studies about the religion, sometimes to convey an image of authority.

Since the 1960s, Candomblé has featured in films such as The Given Word (1962) and The Amulet of Ogum (1974), as well as documentaries like Geraldo Sarno's Iaô (1974). It has also influenced novelists, appearing in works by writers like Jorge Amado, and Toni Morrison. References to the religion also appeared in Brazilian popular music. For instance, Maria Bethânia and Gal Costa's song "Prayer to Mãe Menininha" made it into the country's chart. Objects associated with Candomblé first went on display in police museums but as the religion gained greater acceptance such material also begun to appear in museums devoted to folklore and Afro-Brazilian culture. From the 1990s, practitioners began establishing their own museums within their terreiros. For instance, the bedroom of Mãe Menininha do Gantois, located in her Bahia terreiro, was converted into a memorial in 1992 and then formally recognised as a heritage site in 2002.
