= De Visscher =

De Visscher is a Dutch occupational surname. Visscher is an archaic spelling of Dutch visser meaning "fisherman". The name is now most common in East Flanders. People with this surname include:

- Charles De Visscher (1884–1973), Belgian jurist, brother of Fernand
- Cornelis de Visscher (1628/29–1658), Dutch engraver
- Fernand De Visscher (1885–1964), Belgian legal historian, brother of Charles
- Jan de Visscher (1635/36-aft.1692), Dutch engraver and painter, brother of Cornelis
- Jeffrey de Visscher (born 1981), Dutch footballer
- Lambert de Visscher (1633–aft.1690), Dutch printmaker active in Italy, brother of Cornelis
- Paul De Visscher (1916–1996), Belgian jurist, son of Charles

== See also ==
- De Visser
- Visscher
