= Fisser =

Fisser is surname of Low German and Frisian origin:

- Christoph Fisser
- Martha Hendrik Fisser

See also

- SS Lina Fisser
- SS Marie Fisser

Related surnames

- Visser, Visscher
- Vischer, Fischer
