= Visscher =

Visscher is a Dutch occupational surname. Visscher is an archaic spelling of Dutch visser meaning "fisherman". Varianta are Visschers and De Visscher. The latter form is now most common in East Flanders. Notable people with the surname include:

- Roemer Visscher (1547–1620), merchant and writer from Amsterdam
  - Anna Visscher (1584–1651), Dutch artist, poet, and translator, daughter of Roemer
  - Maria Tesselschade Visscher (1594–1649), Dutch poet, and engraver, daughter of Roemer
- Claes Jansz. Visscher (1587–1652), engraver and publisher from Amsterdam
  - Nicolaes Visscher I (1618–1679), his son, Dutch cartographer and publisher
    - Nicolaes Visscher II (1649–1702), his son, Dutch cartographer and publisher
- Frans Jacobszoon Visscher (fl. 1623–1645), Dutch mariner and explorer; variants of his first name include Franchoijs or Franchoys etc.; his middle name is sometimes abbreviated "Jacobsz."
- Three brothers (de) Visscher of Haarlem:
  - Cornelis Visscher (1628/29 – 1658), Dutch engraver
  - Lambert Visscher (1633 – aft.1690), Dutch printmaker active in Italy
  - Jan de Visscher (1635/36 – aft.1692), Dutch engraver and painter
- Codien Visscher (1835–1912), Dutch translator and writer
- Hugo Visscher (1864–1947), Dutch theologian and politician
- Rinskje Visscher (1868–1950), first female municipal archivist in the Netherlands
- John Paul Visscher (1895–1950), American protozoologist
- Jannie Visscher (born 1961), Dutch politician
- Jantje Visscher (born 1933), American painter, photographer, and sculptor
- Bert Visscher (born 1960), Dutch comedian and cabaret performer
- Maurice Visscher (1901–1983), American physiologist
- Peter Visscher, Dutch-born Australian geneticist

Visschers

- Jacques Visschers (1940–2020), Dutch footballer

De Visscher

- Charles De Visscher (1884–1973), Belgian jurist
- Fernand De Visscher (1885–1964), Belgian legal historian
- Paul De Visscher (1916–1996), Belgian jurist, son of Charles
- Jeffrey de Visscher (born 1981), Dutch footballer

== See also ==
- Visscher Island, Tasmania, named after Frans Jacobszoon Visscher
- Visscher panorama, an engraving of London by Claes Visscher
- Visser, Dutch surname of the same origin
- Vischer, German surname of the same origin
