= Nkondi =

Religious statue in the Congo, Africa

Nkondi (plural varies minkondi, zinkondi, or ninkondi) is the vernacular term for a nail-studded genre of power figure, or nkisi (plural: minkisi), made by the Kongo people of the Congo region. Minkondi are sacred, spiritually empowered vessels that were ceremonially employed to assist regional chiefs in maintaining public order with acts including signing vows, sealing covenants, and finalizing binding agreements to resolve disputes. Minkondi guarded against malefactors, such as through retribution to those who may have failed to honor an accord. Ceremony to employ a nkondi often included animal sacrifice made to the spiritual practitioner while an agreement was enunciated. Iron and wooden objects like blades, nails, and screws were then interacted with physically by the individuals involved (such as by touching to their lips), and then inserted into the nkondi, in more recent times by a hammer. Each individual element inserted into the nkondi acted as a memorandum, with additional elements increasing the fee. An obligation could be annulled through payment and removal of the binding object from the nkondi.

== Etymology ==
Nkondi represent nkisi as the hunter. The word nkondi derives from the verb konda, meaning "to hunt".

== Functions ==
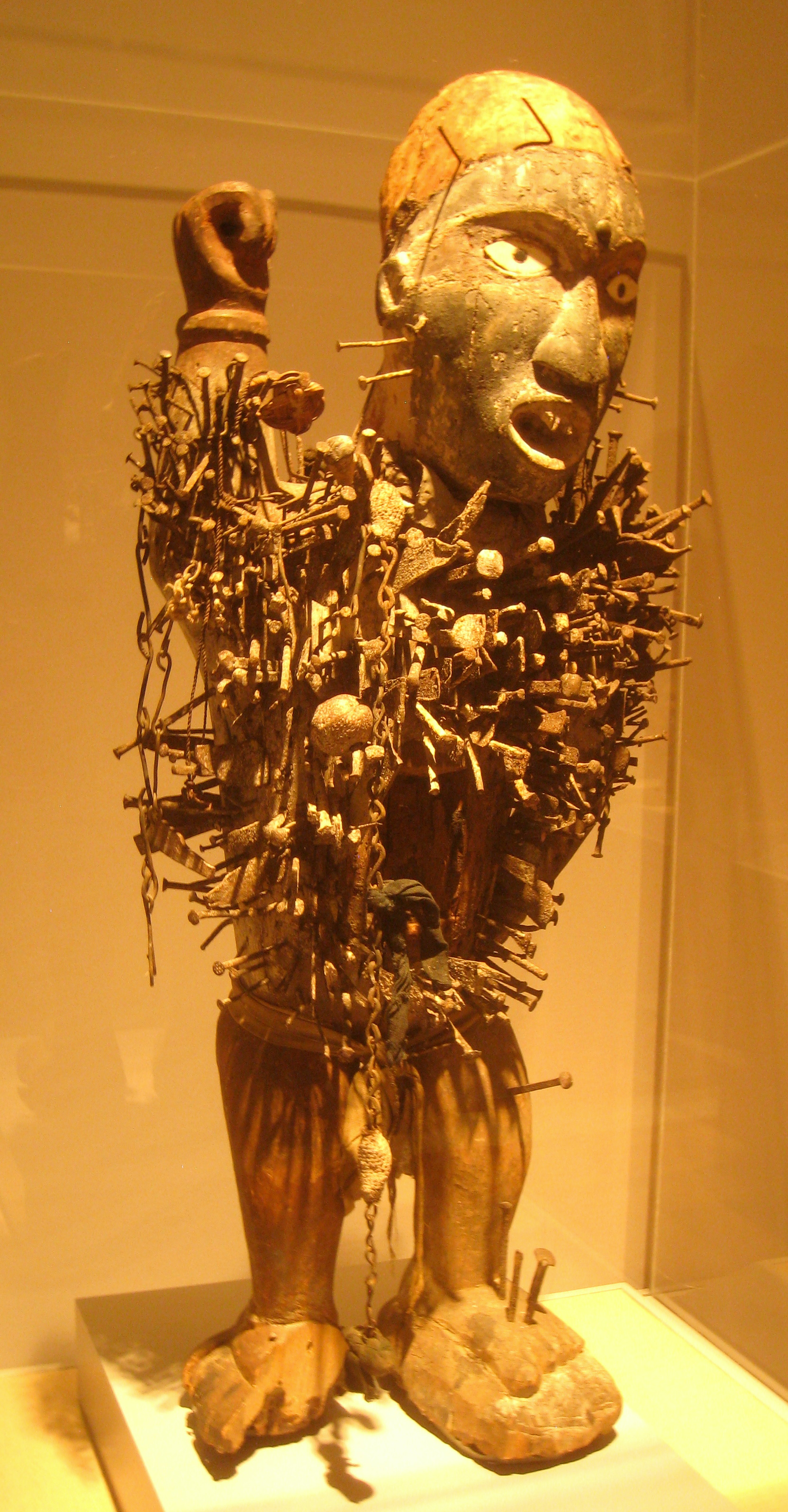
Nkisi Nkondi, Congo, c. 1880-1920.

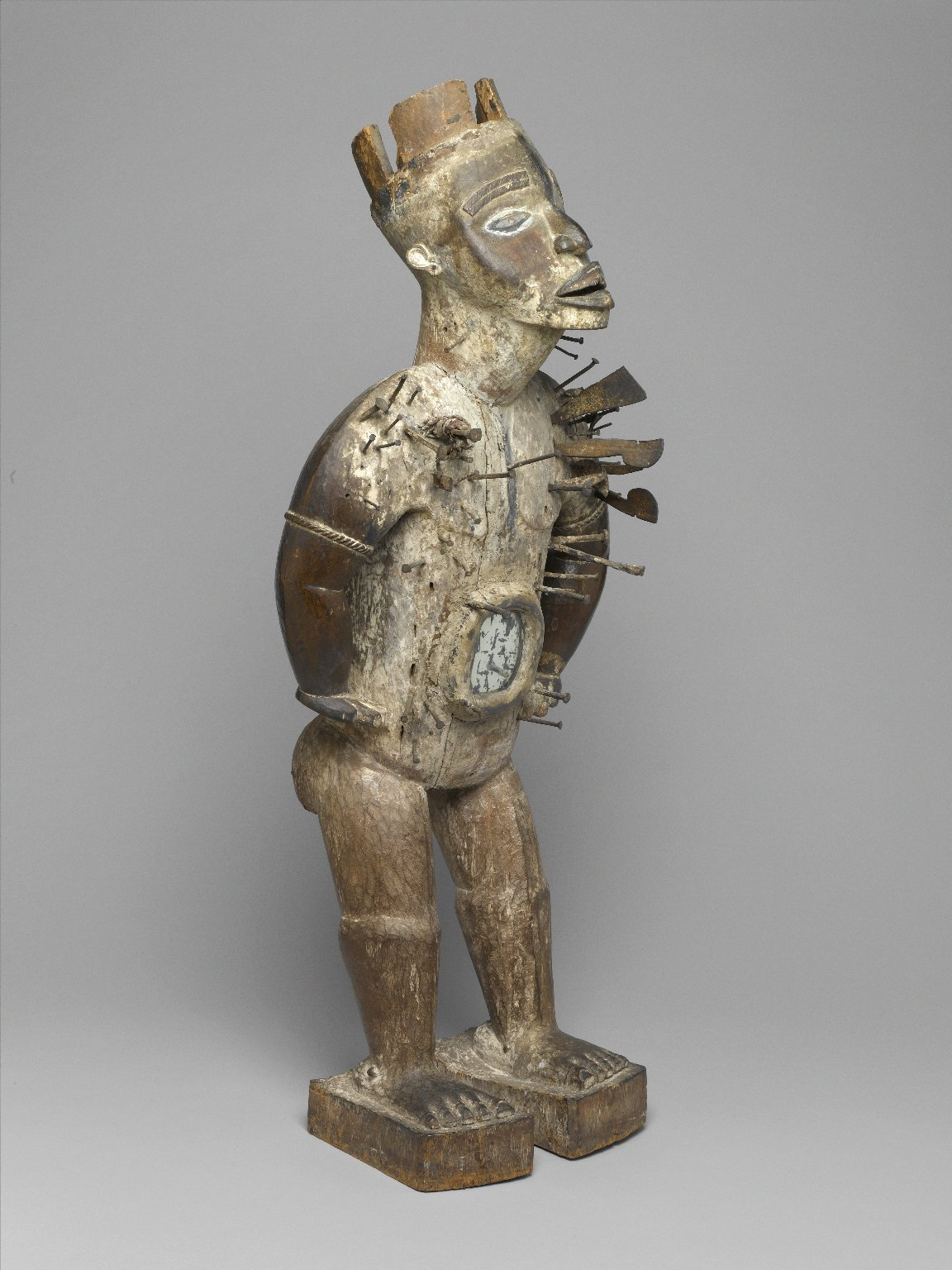
Nkisi Nkondi, from the collection of the Brooklyn Museum.

Minkondi could be considered the most influential class of minkisi. They were regulatory instruments used to act as witness and to regulate or enforce affairs relevant to their communities. They could affirm oaths, protect peace, control violence or forcefully punish oath violators, and would be sent to the front lines of political conflict to facilitate resolution.

The vocabulary of nkondi has connections with Kongo conceptions of witchcraft which are anchored in the belief that it is possible for humans to enroll spiritual forces to inflict harm on others through cursing them or causing them to have misfortune, accidents, or sickness. A frequently used expression for hammering in the nails into a nkondi is "koma nloka" (to attach or hammer in a curse) derives from two ancient Bantu roots *-kom- which includes hammering in its semantic field, and *-dog- which involves witchcraft and cursing. "Kindoki", a term derived from the same root is widely associated with witchcraft, or effecting curses against others, but in fact refers to any action intended to enlist spirits to harm others. If exercised privately for selfish reasons, the use of this power is condemned as witchcraft, but if the power is used publicly by a village, tribe, political leaders, or as a protective measure by innocent people, however, it is not considered witchcraft.

In the catechism of 1624, which probably reflects Christian language dating back to the now lost catechism of 1557, the verb koma was used to translate "to crucify."

== History ==
Because they are aggressive, many nkondi with human figures are carved with their hands raised, sometimes bearing weapons. The earliest representation of an nkisi in this pose can be seen in the coat of arms of the Kingdom of Kongo, designed around 1512 and illustrated between 1528 and 1541, where a broken "idol" is shown with this gesture at the base of the shield. Nailed minkisi are not described in the literature left by missionaries or others in the sixteenth to nineteenth centuries.

Wyatt MacGaffey, citing the work of the late seventeenth century Capuchin missionary Luca da Caltanisetta, noted that in his day, nganga sometimes banged minkisi together, perhaps a method of activating them, and nails, which MacGaffey contends were first being made at the time eventually replaced the metaphor. Other scholars believe that as early as the sixteenth century, Christian iconography of the Crucifixion of Jesus and the martyr Saint Sebastian, brought by Portuguese missionaries to the peoples of Central Africa, may have influenced nkisi tradition. MacGaffey, for his part, speaks against this interpretation, arguing that the concept of nailing is tied up with too many other concepts to be a simple misunderstanding of missionary teaching. Although, this iconography may have reinforced pre-existing forms of expression.

Nkondi with nails were made at least as early as 1864, when the British Commodore A. P. Eardley Wilmont acquired one while suppressing Solongo (Soyo) piracy at the mouth of the Congo River, a piece that was the subject of a contemporary painting and is presently in the Royal Geographical Institute in London. Another early description and illustration of a nailed nkondi (named Mabiala mu ndemba, and described as a "thief-finder") is found in the notes of the German expedition to Loango of 1873-76, so by that time the specific practice of nailing was well established.

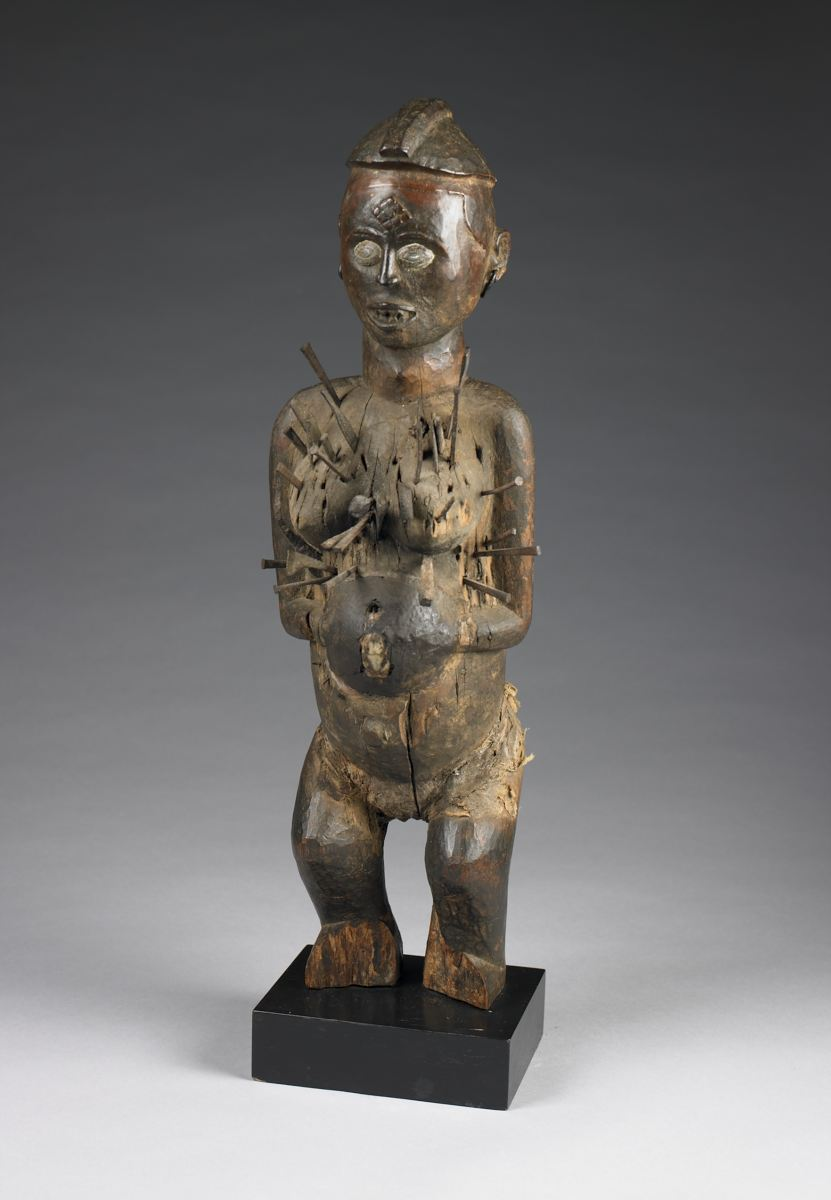
Female Nkisi Nkonde figure held at the Birmingham Museum of Art.

== Construction ==
Nkondi, like other minkisi, are constructed by religious specialists, called nganga (plural zinganga or banganga). The nganga gathers materials, called nlongo (plural bilongo or milongo), which when assembled, will become the home of a spirit. Often these materials include a carved human figure into which the other bilongo are placed. The nganga then either becomes possessed with the spirit or places the finished nkondi in a graveyard or other place where spirits frequent. Once it is charged, the nkondi can then be handed over to the client. According to Kongo testimony of the early twentieth century, people drive nails into the figures as part of a petition for help, healing, or witness-particularly of contracts and pledges. The purpose of the nailing is to "awaken" and sometimes to "enrage" the nkisi to the task in hand.

Nkondi figures could be made in many forms, including pots or cauldrons, which were described and sometimes illustrated in early twentieth century Kikongo texts. Those that used human images (kiteke) were most often nailed, and thus attracted collectors' attention and are better known today. Human figures ranged in size from small to life-size, and contained bilongo (singular longo; often translated as "medicine"), usually hidden by resin-fixed mirrors. Nkondi in the form of wooden figures were often carved with open cavities in their bodies for these substances. The most common place for storage was the belly, though such packs are also frequently placed on the head or in pouches surrounding the neck.

In most nkondi figures the eyes and medicine pack covers were reflective glass or mirrors, used for divination. The reflective surface enabled the nkisi to see in the spirit world in order to spy out its prey. Some nkondi figures were adorned with feathers. This goes along with the concept of the figures as being "of the above", and associates them with birds of prey.

The creation and use of nkondi figures was also a very important aspect to their success. Banganga often composed the nkondi figures at the edge of the village. The village was thought of as being similar to the human body. The idea that the edge and entrances needed to be protected from evil spirits occurred in both the human body and the village. When composing the minkisi, the nganga is often isolated in a hidden camp, away from the rest of the village. After the nkisi was built and the nganga had learned its proper use and the corresponding songs, he returned to the village covered in paint and behaving in a strange manner.

The unusual behavior was to illustrate the ngangas return to the land of the living. Prior to using the nkondi, the nganga recited specific invocations to awaken the nkondi and activate its powers. During their performances, banganga often painted themselves. White circles around the eyes allowed them to see beyond the physical world and see the hidden sources of evil and illness. White stripes were painted on the participants. Often, the nganga was dressed similar to his nkondi. Banganga generally dressed in outfits that were vastly different than normal people. They wore ornate jewelry and often incorporated knots in their clothing. The knots were associated with a way of closing up or sealing of spiritual forces.

== Nkondi in the diaspora ==
Aspects of Kongo spirituality made their way to the Americas via the Atlantic Slave trade. Many African diasporic spiritual traditions, such as Hoodoo and Palo, incorporate such aspects into their customs. Robert Farris Thompson, an American art historian has been particularly diligent, and influential in identifying Kongo influences in the African descended population of the Americas.

== Nkondi in contemporary art ==
European art collectors were interested in nkondi, especially the nailed ones, when they were reported back in the publications of the German Loango Expedition, which brought a good number of them back to Europe. Robert Visser, a German trader and diplomat also collected a great many examples for German museums, particularly in Berlin and Stuttgart. Many were purchased, others confiscated or removed by colonial authorities, and often found their way to museums, but many also remain in private hands.

More recently, artists have worked with the concept and visual imagery of nkondi to produce new works inspired by nkondi. African American artist Renee Stout's "Fetish no. 2 " first exhibited in 1988 is perhaps the most famous of these, a life sized statue cast from Stout's own body with the glass eye features and a few nails reminiscent of nkondi. Stout's work was the subject of a major exhibit at the Smithsonian Institution's Museum of African Art, featuring her various nkisi pieces with commentary by anthropologist Wyatt MacGaffey.

In her mixed media composition "Intertexuality Vol. 1", African American artist Stephanie Dinkins disposed of the human figure of the nkondi but included the nails and the replaced the mirror with a video screen showing a 3-minute presentation, in an exhibition entitled "Voodoo Show: Kongo Criollo" in 1997.

In her performance piece Destierro (Displacement) (first performed in Cuba and the US, 1998–99), Cuban artist Tania Bruguera dressed in a special suit made to resemble a nailed nkondi, and then, after remaining still for some hours, went around looking for those who had broken promises. She performed this piece also at the exhibit "Transfigured Worlds" (28 January-11 April 2010) at the Neuberger Museum of Art (New York).

African American artist Kara Walker featured two nkondi figures in her silhouette piece "Endless Conundrum, an African Anonymous Adventure" in 2001, and frequently re-exhibited. In her self-curated show at the Metropolitan Museum of Art in 2006, Walker also used an nkisi, probably nkondi as a central motif for the show "Kara Walker at the Met: After the Deluge."

In the 2006 group exhibition, "...but I was cool", at Aljira, a Center for Contemporary Art (Newark, NJ), featuring work by Jerry Gant, Robert Pruitt, and Dread Scott, an assemblage by Scott includes a Black toy doll as a power figure with bullets serving as nails. The artists were responding to Harvard University professor Orlando Patterson's May 2006 Op Ed piece in the New York Times, titled, "A Poverty of the Mind."

In African American artist Karen Seneferu's multi-media sculptures, "Techno-Kisi I" and "Techno-Kisi II" both based on a nkondi with rounded nails but she included elements of modern communications technology such as slide shows or iPods to replace the traditionally mirrored eyes and belly. Her work was originally commissioned by the California African American Museum and shown also at the Skirball Cultural Center in 2010.

South African Artist Michael MacGarry exhibited “ivory sculptures referring to Nkondi sculptures as well as the catastrophic aftermath of war," in the exhibition, "Contested Terrain" at the Tate Gallery, London, in August, 2011.

American artist Justin Par adapted the aesthetic and philosophy of Nkisi Nkondi into three sculptures entitled 'Nkondi A', 'Nkondi B', and 'Nkondi C', using nails salvaged from utility poles, to create miniature architectural landscapes, in a solo exhibition entitled "Reliquum", at the Center for Visual Arts, in Greensboro, NC, 2012.

In his 2014 solo exhibition, 'AniMystikAktivist,' at the Goodman Gallery, Cape Town (13 December 2014 - 17 January 2015), South African artist Andrew Lamprecht presented a nkondi figure in modern form and drew attention to the potential Christian origins in the Kingdom of Kongo of the form.

In a 2017 exhibit "The Prophet’s Library", African American artist Wesley Clark displayed "Doing for Self", a nkondi interpretation of the American flag. To Clark, this piece promotes reconciliation between the drifting spirituality and tradition of African diaspora and the injustice experienced in African American history.

== Nkondi in popular culture ==
The Tokyo DisneySea version of Tower of Terror centers around a cursed nkondi figure named Shiriki Utundu, who killed wealthy explorer Harrison Hightower III in a supernatural elevator incident for his disrespect, resulting in Hotel Hightower's closure.

The 2006 film The Promise Keeper revolves around a life-sized Nkondi figure. In the film the nails represent promises made by those who hammered them into the figure, and the object comes to life at night to punish those who break the promises.

== Bibliography ==
- Bassani, Ezio (1977). "Kongo Nail Fetishes from the Chiloango River Area," African Arts 10: 36-40
- Doutreloux, A. (1961). "Magie Yombe," Zaire 15: 45-57.
- Dupré, Marie-Claude (1975). "Les système des forces nkisi chez le Kongo d'après le troisième volume de K. Laman," Africa 45: 12-28.
- Fromont, Cécile. "From Catholic Kingdom to the Heart of Darkness" in The Art of Conversion: Christian Visual Culture in the Kingdom of Kongo. Chapel Hill: Published for the Omohundro Institute of Early American History and Culture, Williamsburg, Virginia, by the University of North Carolina Press, 2014.
- Janzen, John and Wyatt MacGaffey (1974). An Anthology of Kongo Religion Lawrence, KS: University of Kansas Press.
- Laman, Karl (1953–68). The Kongo 4 volumes, Uppsala: Studia Ethnografica Uppsaliensia.
- Lehuard, Raoul. (1980). Fétiches à clou a Bas-Zaire. Arnouville.
- MacGaffey, Wyatt, and John Janzen (1974). "Nkisi Figures of the BaKongo," African Arts 7: 87-89.
- MacGaffey, Wyatt (1977). "Fetishism Revisted: Kongo nkisi in Sociological Perspective." Africa 47: 140-152.
- MacGaffey, Wyatt (1988). "Complexity, Astonishment and Power: The Visual Vocabulary of Kongo Minkisi" Journal of Southern African Studies14: 188-204.
- MacGaffey, Wyatt, ed. and transl. (1991), Art and Healing of the Bakongo Commented Upon by Themselves Bloomington, IN: Indiana University Press.
- MacGaffey, Wyatt. "The Eyes of Understanding: Kongo Minkisi," in Wyatt MacGaffey and M. Harris, eds, Astonishment and Power Washington, DC: Smithsonian Institution Press, pp. 21–103.
- MacGaffey, Wyatt (1998). "'Magic, or as we usually say 'Art': A Framework for Comparing African and European Art," in Enid Schildkrout and Curtis Keim, eds. The Scramble for Art in Central Africa. Cambridge and New York: Cambridge University Press, pp. 217–235.
- MacGaffey, Wyatt (2000). Religion and Society in Central Africa: The BaKongo of Lower Zaire Chicago: University of Chicago Press.
- Vanhee, Hein (2000). "Agents of Order and Disorder: Kongo Minkisi," in Karel Arnaut, ed. Revisions: New Perspectives on African Collections of the Horniman Museum. London and Coimbra, pp. 89–106.
- Van Wing, Joseph (1959). Etudes Bakongo Brussels: Descleė de Brouwer.
- Volavkova, Zdenka (1972). "Nkisi Figures of the Lower Congo" African Arts 5: 52-89.
