= Visser =

Visser (Dutch pronunciation: [ˈvɪ.sər]) is a Dutch occupational surname, meaning "fisherman". In 2007, nearly 50,000 people in the Netherlands carried the name, making it the eighth most populous name in the country. Common variant forms of the name are De Visser, Visscher, and Vissers.

== Geographical distribution ==
As of 2014, 43.7% of all known bearers of the surname Visser were residents of South Africa (frequency 1:870), 39.3% of the Netherlands (1:303), 4.8% of the United States (1:52,799), 3.3% of Mozambique (1:5,812), 2.1% of Canada (1:12,250), 1.6% of Australia (1:10,599) and 1.3% of Germany (1:42,516).

In the Netherlands, the frequency of the surname was higher than national average (1:303) in the following provinces:

1. Friesland (1:94)
2. Flevoland (1:165)
3. Groningen (1:212)
4. North Holland (1:222)
5. South Holland (1:274)

In South Africa, the frequency of the surname was higher than national average (1:870) in the following provinces:

1. Northern Cape (1:191)
2. Western Cape (1:382)
3. North West (1:755)
4. Free State (1:816)
5. Gauteng (1:830)

== People ==
- A. G. Visser (1878–1929), Afrikaans poet
- Ad Visser (born 1947), Dutch radio presenter
- Adrie Visser (born 1983), Dutch cyclist
- Angela Visser (born 1966), Dutch model and actress
- Aron Visser (born 1999), South African cricketer
- Atie Visser (1914–2014), Dutch resistance fighter during World War II
- Audrae Visser (1919–2001), American poet
- Barbara Visser (born 1977), Dutch politician
- Barbara Visser (artist) (born 1966), Dutch artist
- Barney Visser (born 1949), American businessman and racing team owner
- Beitske Visser (born 1995), Dutch racing driver
- Brian Visser (born 1987), American soccer goalkeeper
- Carel Visser (1928–2015), Dutch sculptor
- Christia Visser (born 1992), South African actress and singer
- Cor Visser (1903–1982), Dutch artist
- Cornelis Visser (born 1964), Dutch politician
- Danie Visser (born 1961), South African tennis player
- Dennis Visser (born 1993), South African rugby player
- Dennis Visser (speed skater) (born 1995), Dutch short track speed skater
- Eelco Visser (born 1966), Dutch computer scientist
- Elizabeth Visser (1908–1987), Dutch classical scholar
- Eric Visser (born 1951), Dutch publisher
- Esmee Visser (born 1996), Dutch speed skater
- Floris Visser (born 1983), Dutch opera director
- Gerrit Visser (1903–1984), Dutch footballer
- Gian Visser (born 1975), South African IT entrepreneur
- Guido Visser (born 1970), Canadian cross-country skier
- Guillaume Visser (1880–1952), Belgian rower
- Henk Visser (collector) (1923–2006), Dutch arms and armory collector
- Henk Visser (long jumper) (1932–2015), Dutch long jumper
- Henk Visser (pediatrician) (1930–2023), Dutch pediatrician
- Henk Visser (politician) (born 1946), Dutch politician
- Impi Visser (born 1995), South African rugby player
- Ingrid Visser (biologist) (born 1966), New Zealand marine biologist
- Ingrid Visser (volleyball) (1977–2013), Dutch volleyball player
- Jenny Visser-Hooft (1888–1939), Dutch traveler, mountaineer, and naturalist, wife of Philips
- Jaco Visser (born c. 1970), South African rugby player
- John E. Visser (1920–1997), American University president
- Jurgen Visser (born 1989), South African rugby player
- Kevin Visser (born 1988), Dutch footballer
- Kyle Visser (born 1985), American basketball player
- Leo Visser (born 1966), Dutch speed skater
- Lesley Visser (born 1953), American sportscaster
- Lieuwe Visser (1940–2014), Dutch operatic baritone and singing teacher
- Lucie Visser (born 1958), Dutch model and actress
- Margaret Visser (born 1940), Canadian writer and broadcaster
- Marius Visser (born 1982), Namibian rugby player
- Mark Visser (born 1983), Australian surfer
- Mart Visser (born 1968), Dutch fashion designer
- Martinus Visser (1924–2008), Australian sailor
- Matt Visser, New Zealand mathematician
- Mattijs Visser (born 1958), Dutch organizer of art exhibitions
- Maura Visser (born 1985), Dutch handballer
- Nadine Visser (born 1995), Dutch heptathlete
- Naomi Visser (born 2001), Dutch artistic gymnast
- Nikki Visser (born 1975), Australian model, television presenter, and actress
- Paul Calvin Visser (born c. 1936), American mayor of Flint, Michigan
- Philips Christiaan Visser (1882–1955), Dutch geographer, explorer, mountaineer, and diplomat
- Peter Visser (born 1960), New Zealand cricketer
- Piet Visser, pseudonym of Belgian writer Lode Van Den Bergh (1920–2020)
- Ria Visser (born 1961), Dutch speed skater and TV commentator
- Rinze Visser (1938–2026), Dutch politician
- Robert Visser (1860–1937), German photographer
- Rod Visser, Canadian politician
- Rokus Bernardus Visser (1914–1977), Dutch and later Indonesian military commander
- Sanna Visser (born 1984), Dutch volleyball player
- Sep Visser (born 1990), Dutch rugby union player
- Sim Visser (1908–1983), Dutch politician
- Susan Visser (born 1965), Dutch film actress
- Thijs Visser (born 1989), Aruban sailor
- Tim Visser (born 1987), Dutch rugby player representing Scotland; brother of Sep
- Wayne Visser (born 1970), South African writer, academic, social entrepreneur and futurist
- Werner Visser (born 1998), South African discus thrower
- Willem Jacob Visser (1915–1991), Dutch linguist
- Yge Visser (born 1963), Dutch chess player
- Yolandi Visser (born 1984), South African singer/rapper
- Yvonne Visser (born 1965), Canadian biathlete
- Zarck Visser (born 1989), South African long jumper

== Compound names ==
- Haas Visser 't Hooft (1905–1977), Dutch field hockey player
- Willem Visser 't Hooft (1900–1985), Dutch secretary general of the World Council of Churches
