= Vissers =

Vissers is a Dutch occupational surname, meaning "fisherman's". Notable people with the surname include:

- Edward Vissers (1912–1994), Belgian racing cyclist
- Job Vissers (born 1984), Dutch racing cyclist
- Joseph Vissers (1928–2006), Belgian lightweight boxer
- Linda Vissers (born 1961), Belgian Flemish politician
- Margreet Vissers, New Zealand biochemistry academic
- Melvin Vissers (born 1996), Dutch football midfielder
- Wesley Vissers (born 1993), Dutch bodybuilder

== See also ==
- Visser
