= Gabi Dachs =

New Zealand cancer researcher

Academic background
- Education: University of Cape Town
- Thesis: The effect of metronidazole on Bacteroides fragilis and Escherichia coli (1992)
- Doctoral advisor: Valerie Abratt

Gabriele Ursula Dachs is a New Zealand academic, and is a full professor at the University of Otago, specialising in the how cancer cells respond to hypoxia, and developing novel treatments for cancer.

== Early life and education ==
Dachs was born and raised in Namibia. Dachs completed a Bachelor of Science at the University of Cape Town in South Africa, followed by a PhD titled The effect of metronidazole on Bacteroides fragilis and Escherichia coli at the same institution.

== Academic career ==
After conducting postdoctoral research at MRC Harwell in the United Kingdom, Dachs joined the Gray Cancer Institute in London as a senior scientist. She then moved to New Zealand, where she joined the faculty of the Department of Pathology at the University of Otago, becoming a research associate professor in 2015 and then full professor in 2023.

Dachs works in the Mackenzie Cancer Research Group and is based at Otago's Christchurch campus. She is interested in the molecular mechanisms that make cancers difficult to treat and in developing new treatments. Dachs has explored how cancer cells respond to hypoxia (low oxygen levels) and how the hypoxic pathway is affected by vitamin C. Dachs led research that showed that cancer cells from colon tumours removed during surgery retained vitamin C if the patient had received a very high dose infusion of vitamin C before their surgery. Previous work by her group had found that vitamin C might be an effective anticancer agent, but as solid tumours have 'disorganised' blood flow, it was not clear if vitamin C would reach or be retained in tumour cells. Dachs is also interested in why obese cancer patients do less well in treatment, and whether molecular causes for this can be identified. She is also looking at how to improve cancer treatment using prodrugs and gene therapy. Her research spans cell culture, rodent models, and clinical trials in cancer patients.

== Honours and awards ==
In 2021 Dachs was awarded the University of Otago Christchurch Research Gold Medal.

== Selected works ==
- Guise, Chris; Maria R Abbattista; Singleton, Rachelle; Samuel D Holford; Joanna Connolly; Dachs, Gabi Ursula; Fox, Stephen B.; Robert Pollock; Justin Harvey; Guilford, Parry John; Fernando Doñate; William R Wilson; Adam Patterson (2010). "The bioreductive prodrug PR-104A is activated under aerobic conditions by human aldo-keto reductase 1C3". Cancer Research. 70 (4): 1573–1584. doi:10.1158/0008-5472.can-09-3237. PMID 20145130. Wikidata Q34097892.
- Williams, Kaye Janine; Telfer, Brian; Dia Xenaki; Mary R Sheridan; Isabelle Desbaillets; Hans J W Peters; Davina Honess; Harris, Adrian L.; Dachs, Gabi Ursula; Albert van der Kogel; Ian Stratford (2005). "Enhanced response to radiotherapy in tumours deficient in the function of hypoxia-inducible factor-1". Radiotherapy and Oncology. 75 (1): 89–98. doi:10.1016/j.radonc.2005.01.009. PMID 15878106. Wikidata Q47801291.
- Dachs, Gabi Ursula; Joanna Tupper; Tozer, Gillian Mary (2005). "From bench to bedside for gene-directed enzyme prodrug therapy of cancer". Anti-Cancer Drugs. 16 (4): 349–359. doi:10.1097/00001813-200504000-00001. PMID 15746571. Wikidata Q36061340.
- Caroline Kuiper; Ilona G M Molenaar; Dachs, Gabi Ursula; Currie, Margaret Jane; Sykes, Peter H.; Vissers, Margreet (2010). "Low ascorbate levels are associated with increased hypoxia-inducible factor-1 activity and an aggressive tumor phenotype in endometrial cancer". Cancer Research. 70 (14): 5749–5758. doi:10.1158/0008-5472.can-10-0263. PMID 20570889. Wikidata Q43008648.
- Vissers, Margreet; Gunningham, Sarah P.; Mary J Morrison; Dachs, Gabi Ursula; Currie, Margaret Jane (2006). "Modulation of hypoxia-inducible factor-1 alpha in cultured primary cells by intracellular ascorbate". Free Radical Biology and Medicine. 42 (6): 765–772. doi:10.1016/j.freeradbiomed.2006.11.023. PMID 17320759. Wikidata Q40167157.
- Dachs, Gabi Ursula; Michelle A Hunt; Sophie Syddall; Dean C Singleton; Patterson, Adam V. (2009). "Bystander or no bystander for gene directed enzyme prodrug therapy". Molecules. 14 (11): 4517–4545. doi:10.3390/molecules14114517. PMC 6255103. PMID 19924084. Wikidata Q37634940.
- Caroline Kuiper; Dachs, Gabi Ursula; Currie, Margaret Jane; Vissers, Margreet (2014). "Intracellular ascorbate enhances hypoxia-inducible factor (HIF)-hydroxylase activity and preferentially suppresses the HIF-1 transcriptional response". Free Radical Biology and Medicine. 69: 308–317. doi:10.1016/j.freeradbiomed.2014.01.033. PMID 24495550. Wikidata Q59617798.
