= Renee Stout =

American artist (born 1958)

Renee L. Stout
- Born: 1958 (age 67–68); Junction City, Kansas, U.S.
- Education: Carnegie Mellon University, Pittsburgh, Pennsylvania
- Known for: Assemblage art

Renée Stout (born 1958) is an American sculptor and contemporary artist known for assemblage artworks dealing with her personal history and African-American heritage. Born in Kansas, raised in Pittsburgh, living in Washington, D.C., and connected through her art to New Orleans, her art reflects this interest in African diasporic culture throughout the United States. Stout was the first American artist to exhibit in the Smithsonian's National Museum of African Art.

== Early life ==
Stout was born in Junction City, Kansas to a family that enjoyed creative activities. Her mother did needlework. Her father, a mechanic and steelworker, liked to tinker. An uncle was a fine-art painter.

When Stout was one year old, her family returned to the East Liberty neighborhood in Pittsburgh. She took weekend classes at the Carnegie Museum of Art as a child, which she credits for exposing her to African art. In particular, two objects at the Carnegie Museum profoundly influenced her: shrunken heads from South America and nkisi. Writing of her pivotal encounter at the age of ten years old with an nkisi nkondi, "I saw a piece there that had all these nails in it ... And I think once I got exposed to more African art in my travels as I got older, I found that I started going back to the pieces like that."

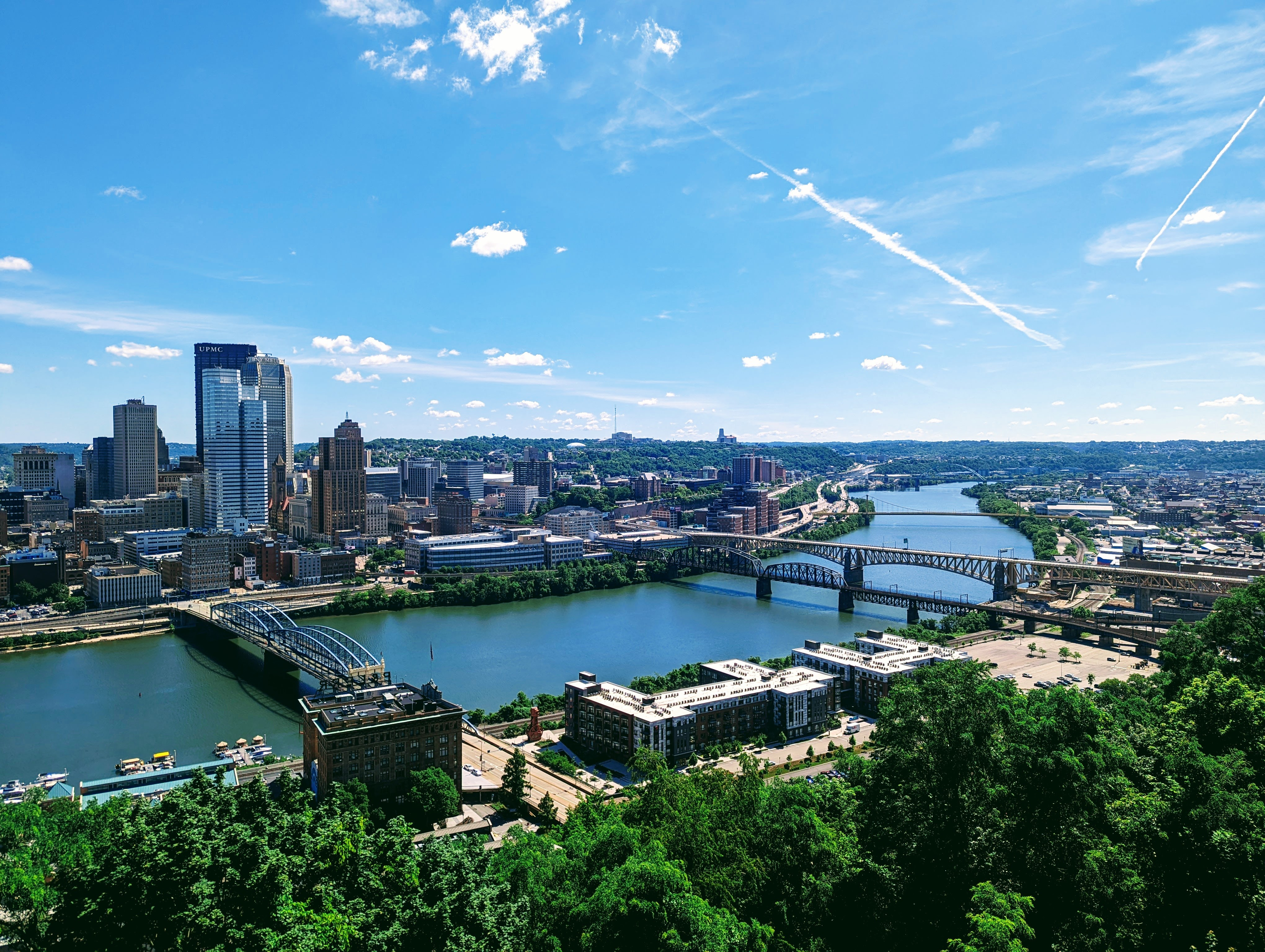
Pittsburgh Skyline from the Upper Incline Overlook

Greene has noted that Stout's childhood years in Pittsburgh coincided with Betty Davis' move there, and that Stout owned all three of her records as a teenager. In an interview with Greene, she compared the reception of Betty Davis' work with the reception she expected for her own: "People were not ready for her. . . . I think it's going to be the same with my work: 'Oh, that's weird . . . ' And then one day, way down the line when I'm eighty or ninety, it's like, 'Oh, we get it now!' [laughter]"

== Career ==
Elegba (Spirit of the Crossroads) (2015) at the Phillips Collection in 2022

Stout attended Carnegie-Mellon University, where she trained as a photo-realist painter at the CMU School of the Arts. She graduated with a BFA in 1980, where she followed the realist style of Edward Hopper and Richard Estes. She then worked as a professional sign painter, exhibiting her skill by painting convincing images of textures such as glass, plastic and cardboard.

After moving to Washington, D.C., in 1985, Stout was exposed to the gritty reality of urban drug use and racism–themes which she has incorporated into her work. Stout also explores her African-American heritage in her art. Through the African diaspora, as well as the world and her immediate environment, Stout finds the inspiration to create works that encourage self-examination, self-empowerment and self-healing, harnessing the belief systems of African peoples and their descendants.

Additionally, Stout uses imaginary characters to create a variety of artwork, some of which include: painting, mixed media sculpture, photography and installation. Stout is the recipient of awards from the Joan Mitchell Foundation, the Pollock-Krasner Foundation and the Louis Comfort Tiffany Foundation, and has shown her work in solo and group shows throughout the United States, and in England, Russia and the Netherlands.

In 1993, Stout was the first African American to have a one-person exhibition at the Smithsonian Institution's National Museum of African Art. Her exhibition was titled The Eyes of Understanding: Kongo Minkisi and The Art of Renee Stout.

Renee Stout was a 2000 Artist-in-Residence at the Tryon Center for Visual Art in Charlotte, NC. In 2021 she was one of the jurors for The Phillips Collection's juried invitational, Inside Outside, Upside Down, a show that "forces us to remember a time that left us 'confused, battered, and disoriented' through the eyes of 64 D.C.-area artists."

== Artistic style ==
Headstone for Marie Laveau (1990) at the National Gallery of Art in 2022

Combining vestigial African American customs and street culture with the theatrical and carnivalesque, Stout's oeuvre consists of handmade assemblages, installations and tableaus, vibrant paintings, prints, and photographs – all of which are employed in the creation of complex narratives featuring characters conceived by the artist. Her artistic influences include Yoruba sculpture, and the nkisi (sacred objects) of the Central African Congo Basin, which she first saw at the Carnegie Museums of Pittsburgh in her youth.

Mannish Boy Arrives (For Muddy Waters) (2017) at the Phillips Collection in 2022

Other subjects in her work often include Haitian Vodou, the space and culture of New Orleans and the creole Voodoo practitioner Marie Laveau. In an interview conducted by Dr.O in her book Tales of the Conjure Woman, Stout says that in order to open the conversations, regarding the ancestry of African American culture, she will continue inspiring her works on themes such as African-derived spiritual belief systems and Vodou. She also admits to having to "occupy a weird space within the art world--a place that has more possibilities, both in energy and spirit" Tales of the Conjure Woman presents an artistic interpretation of Hoodoo and Voodoo that unmasks these mysterious and lasting traditions. Channeling her alter ego, Fatima Mayfield, a fictitious herbalist and fortune-teller, looks to these cultural traditions as a jumping-off point for developing her own distinct visual language, resulting in a complex body of work that is meticulously constructed and laden with symbolism.

Stout's sculptural installations often include materials used in the practice of Voodoo. Handmade potions, roots and herbs, found objects, bones, and feathers are combined with painted and sculptural elements. Other aspects her work include examinations of positive and negative interpretations of blood, fire, and guns. Examples of this can be seen in Bellona (Roman Goddess of War), Baby’s First Gun, and Arsenal for The Fire Next Time.

Stout's work also suggests a diverse group of American artists as influences– the photorealist painter Richard Estes, sculptor Joseph Cornell, installation artist Edward Kienholz, and assemblage artist Betye Saar. Their impact is apparent in Stout's use of trompe l'oeil painting, found-object tableaus, and handmade mechanical and totemic forms. Stout's early experience as a professional sign painter and ongoing interest in handmade commercial signage comes through in various pieces as well.

== Exhibitions ==
Stout has participated in a large number of solo shows in the United States and internationally. Her notable solo shows include Astonishment and Power: Kongo Minkisi and the Art of Renée Stout (1993), Smithsonian American Art Museum, Smithsonian Institution, Washington, DC; Ranting in the Night Studio (2003), The Morgan Gallery, Kansas City, Missouri; Readers, Advisors, and Storefront Churches (2005), Ogden Museum of Southern Art, New Orleans; Renée Stout: Tales of the Conjure Woman (2013-2016), originating at the Halsey Institute of Contemporary Art, Charleston, South Carolina; and Renée Stout: Between Two Worlds (2017), Sean Scully Studio, New York.

Andrea Barnwell Brownlee was involved with one of Renee Stout's larger installation exhibitions, The Thinking Room (2005), and a book, Renee Stout: Tales of the Conjure Woman, which "brings together more than sixty recent works and draws viewers into a dynamic, complex, and richly textured web. This exhibition of fictitious tales and courageous ingenuity offers a rare and special opportunity for viewers to explore the mythic, folk, and spiritual traditions that inform and shape Stout's complex world view and temporarily suspend disbelief" Subsequently, these works became the subject of the traveling exhibition Tales of the Conjure Woman (2013-2016), originating at the Halsey Institute of Contemporary Art.

She has also participated in numerous group shows and exhibitions, including Afro-Atlantic Histories, and Spirit in the Land, a traveling show and accompanying publication organized by the Nasher Museum of Art at Duke University, North Carolina, in 2023, and exhibited at Pérez Art Museum Miami, Florida in 2024.

In Fall 2025, Stout’s work was featured in an exhibit at the Kreeger Museum titled Anonymous Was a Woman: Jae Ko | linn meyers | Joyce J. Scott | Renée Stout. The exhibit featured the work of artists in the Washington, D.C. area who are also Anonymous Was a Woman grantees. The exhibit was curated by Dr. Vesela Sretenović, who co-curated the Grey Art Museum’s Summer 2025 group exhibit Anonymous Was a Woman: The First 25 Years. In that same year, her work was showcased at the American University Art Museum at the Katzen Arts Center as part of the "Women Artists of the DMV" exhibition curated by F. Lennox Campello.

== Notable works in public collections ==
- The Grandfather (1983), National Gallery of Art, Washington, DC
- Fetish #1 (1987), Dallas Museum of Art
- Fetish #2 (1988), Dallas Museum of Art
- Ceremonial Object (1990), National Museum of African American History and Culture, Smithsonian Institution, Washington, DC
- Headstone for Marie Laveau (1990), Museum of Fine Arts, Houston
- She Kept Her Conjuring Table Very Neat (1990), Virginia Museum of Fine Arts, Richmond
- Erzulie Dreams (1992), Virginia Museum of Fine Arts, Richmond
- The Old Fortune Teller's Board (1993), Smithsonian American Art Museum, Smithsonian Institution, Washington, DC
- The Colonel's Cabinet (1991-1994), Smithsonian American Art Museum, Smithsonian Institution, Washington, DC
- See the Truth (2002), Hirshhorn Museum and Sculpture Garden, Smithsonian Institution, Washington, DC
- Seduction Coat (2004), Baltimore Museum of Art and National Gallery of Art, Washington, DC
- See-Line Woman (2009), Hood Museum of Art, Hanover, New Hampshire
- Crossroads Marker with Little Hand, Reaching (2015), Minneapolis Institute of Art
- Elegba (Spirit of the Crossroads) (2015), Phillips Collection, Washington, DC
- Incantation #6 - The Alchemy of Healing (2015), Africa Museum, Berg en Dal, Netherlands
- Mannish Boy Arrives (For Muddy Waters) (2017), Phillips Collection, Washington, DC
- Hoodoo Assassin # 6 (The Chameleon) (2019), High Museum of Art, Atlanta

== Awards ==
- Pollock-Krasner Foundation Award (1991, 1999)
- The Louis Comfort Tiffany Foundation Award (1993)
- Anonymous Was A Woman Award (1999)
- Joan Mitchell Award (2005)
- High Museum of Art David C. Driskell Prize (2010)
- Janet & Walter Sondheim Artscape Prize (2012)
- Carnegie Mellon University Alumni Achievement Award (2015)
- The Louis Comfort Tiffany Foundation (2018)
- Women's Caucus for Art Lifetime Achievement Award (2018)
