= The Large Cat (Visscher) =

Engraving by Cornelis Visscher

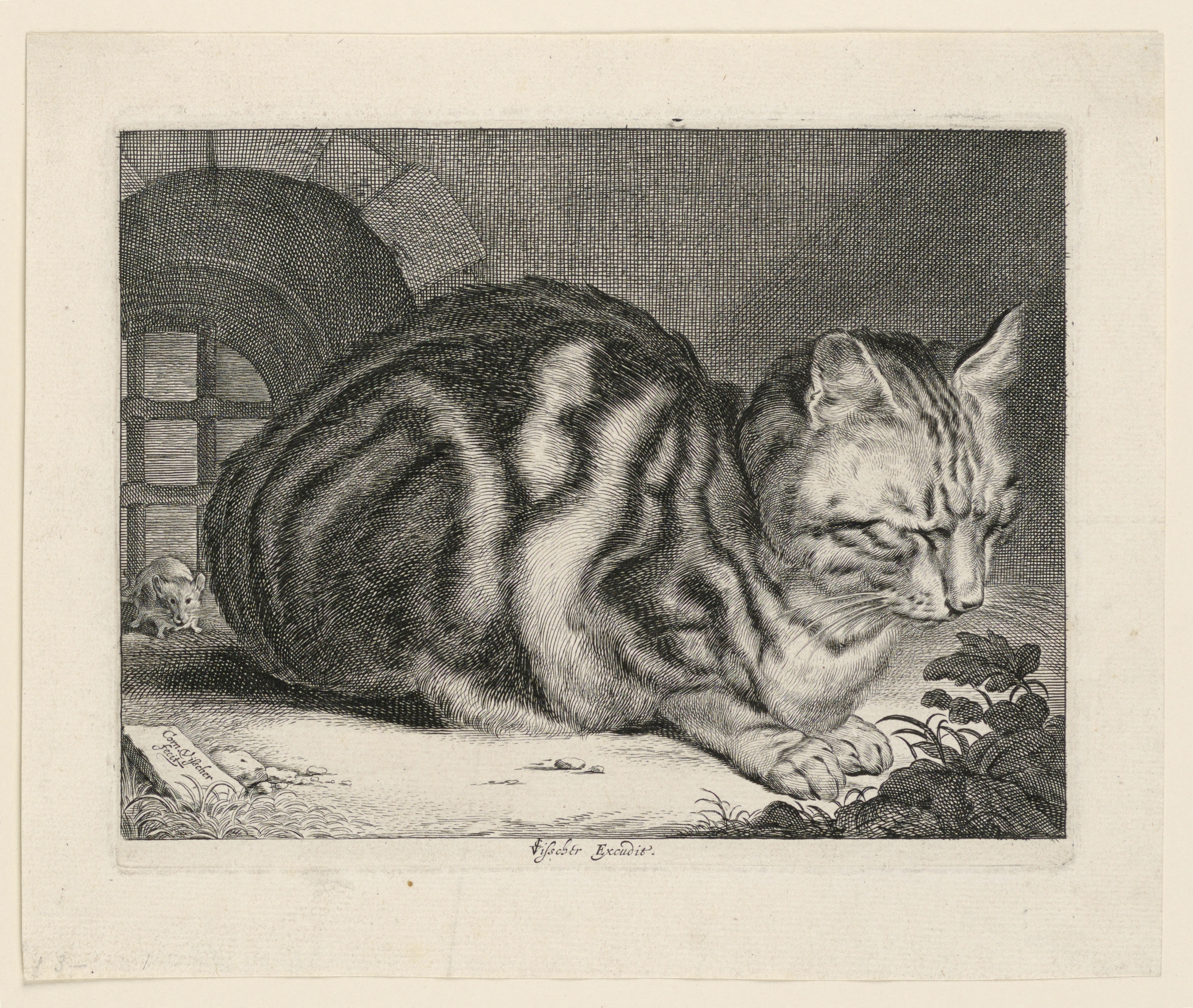
The Large Cat, engraving by Cornelis Visscher, 1657

The Large Cat, also known as Cat Sleeping, is a 1657 engraving by Dutch artist Cornelis Visscher (1629-1658). Two states are known. It measures 14.3 cm × 18.7 cm (5.6 in × 7.4 in).

Visscher's engraving depicts a tabby cat crouching at rest, facing towards some plants seen in silhouette to the lower right. The large cat nearly fills the frame. Visscher expertly expresses the stiffness of the cat's whiskers, and the softness of its fur. A mouse is emerging through the bars of an arched window to the left behind the cat. A stone to the lower left reads "Corn. Visscher fecit", and the caption to the engraving states "CJVisscher Excudit". It is possible that Visscher's depiction of a sleeping cat, ignoring the mouse creeping out behind it, is alluding to a Biblical verse, Proverbs 19:15, that " Slothfulness casteth into a deep sleep; and an idle soul shall suffer hunger."

A preparatory drawing was sold in 1883 but has been lost. Copies of the print are held in many public collections. An example of the original print was sold at Christie's in 2009 for £1,125, and one at Bonhams in October 2018 for US$3,125.
