= Nganga =

Kongo spiritual healer

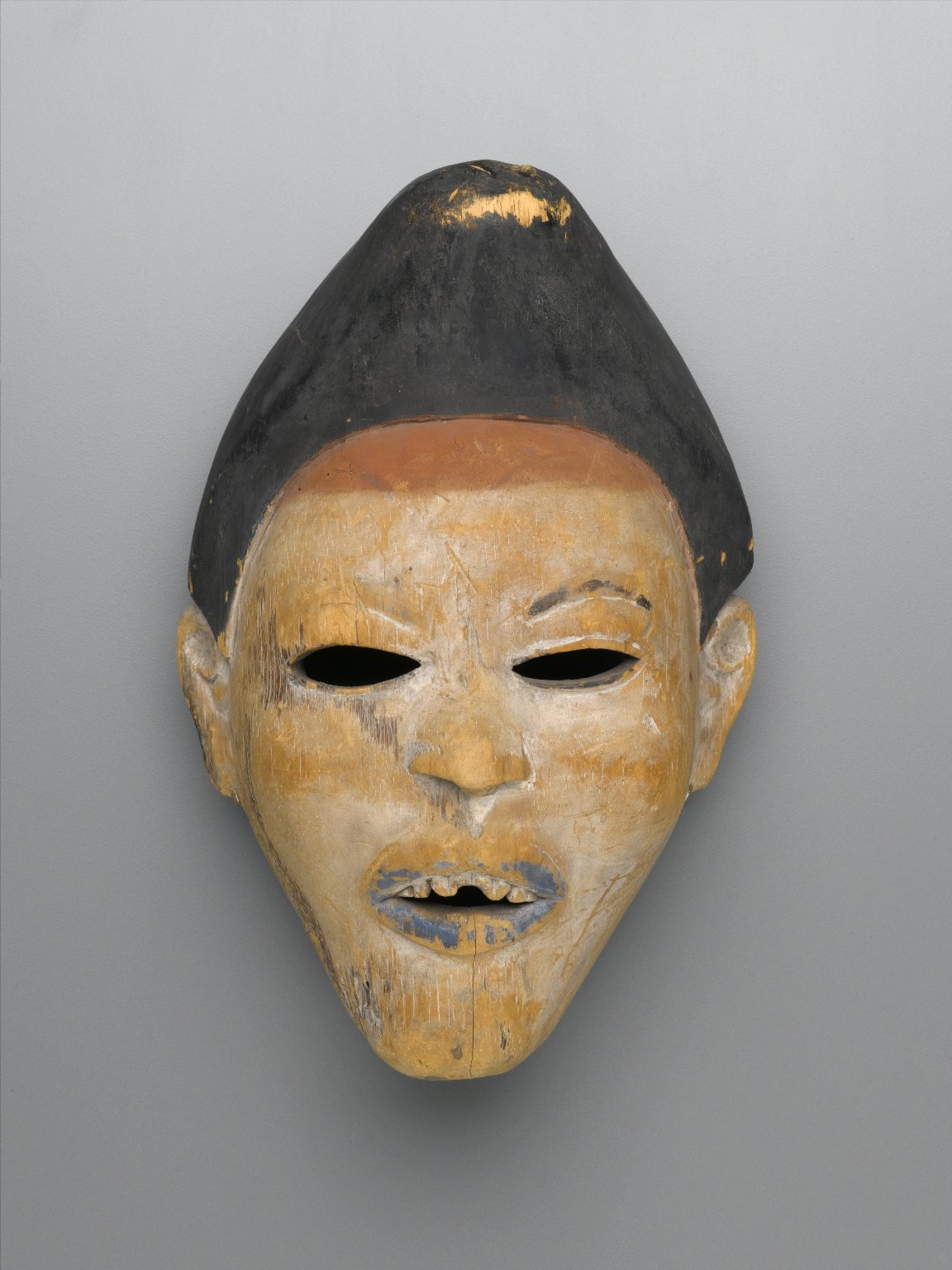
Nganga mask, from the collection of the Brooklyn Museum

A nganga (pl. banganga or kimbanda) is a spiritual healer, diviner, and ritual specialist in traditional Kongo religion. These experts also exist across the African diaspora in countries where Kongo and Mbundu people were transported during the Atlantic slave trade, such as Brazil, the southern United States, Venezuela, Haiti and Cuba.

== Etymology ==
Nganga means "expert" in the Kikongo language. The Portuguese corruption of the meaning was "fetisher." It could also be derived from -ganga, which means "medicine" in Proto-Bantu. As this term is a multiple reflex of a Proto-Bantu root, there are slight variations on the term throughout the entire Bantu-speaking world.

== Central Africa ==
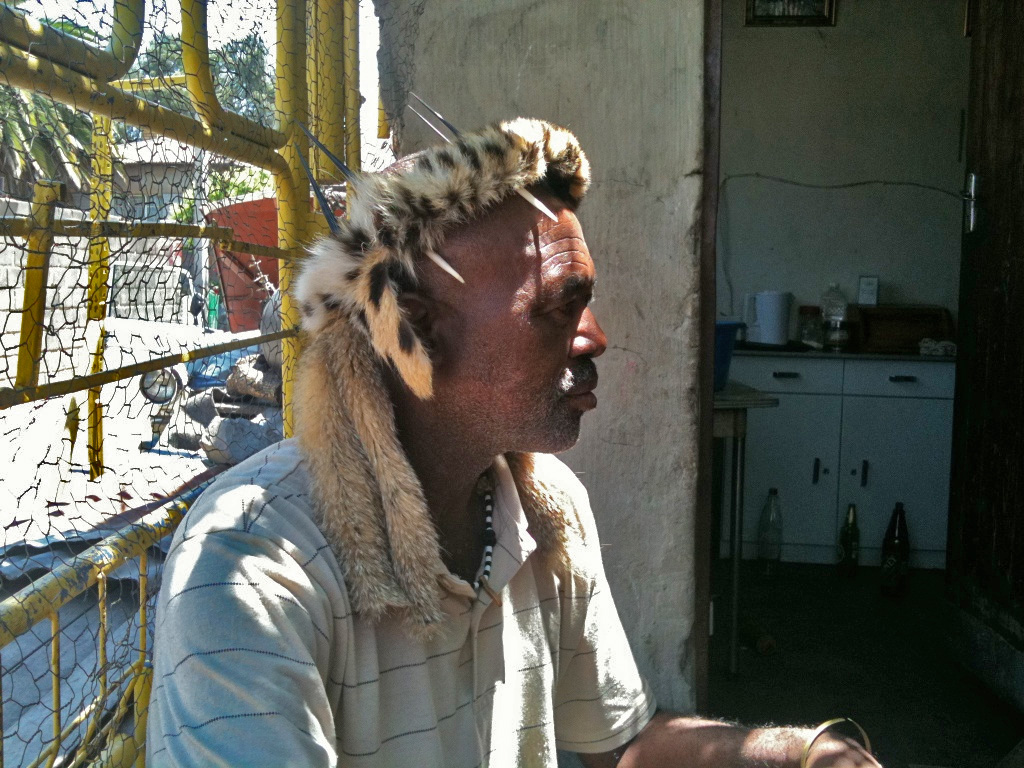
Inyanga from Johannesburg, South Africa

In the Kingdom of Kongo and the Kingdom of Ndongo, expert healers, known as banganga, underwent extensive training to commune with the ancestors in the spiritual realms and seek guidance from them. They possessed the skill to communicate with the ancestors in the spiritual realm, or Ku Mpémba, as well as divining the cause of illness, misfortune and social stress and preparing measures to address them, often by supernatural means and sacred medicine, or minkisi.

They were also responsible for charging a nkisi, or physical objects intended to be the receptacle for spiritual forces that heal and protect its owner. When Kongo converted to Christianity in the late fifteenth century, the term nganga was used to translate Christian priest as well as traditional spiritual mediators. In modern Kongo Christianity, priests are often called "Nganga a Nzambi" or "priests of God." The owner and operator of an nkisi, who ministered its powers to others, was the nganga.

An English missionary describes how an nganga looks during his healing performance:

Thick circles of white around the eyes, a patch of red across the forehead, broad stripes of yellow are drawn down the cheeks, bands of red, white, or yellow run down the arms and across the chest.... His dress consists of the softened skins of wild animals, either whole or in strips, feathers of birds, dried fibres and leaves, ornaments of leopard, crocodile or rat's teeth, small tinkling bells, rattling seedpods...

This wild appearance was intended to create a frightening effect, or kimbulua in the Kongo language. The nganga's costume was often modeled on his nkisi. The act of putting on the costume was itself part of the performance; all participants were marked with red and white stripes, called makila, for protection.

The "circles of white around the eyes" refer to mamoni lines (from the verb mona, to see). These lines purport to indicate the ability to see hidden sources of illness and evil.

Yombe nganga often wore white masks, whose color represented the spirit of a deceased person. White was also associated with justice, order, truth, invulnerability, and insight: all virtues associated with the nganga.

The nganga is instructed in the composition of the nkondi, perhaps in a dream, by a particular spirit. In one description of the banganga's process, the nganga then cuts down a tree for the wood that s/he will use to construct the nkondi. S/he then kills a chicken, which causes the death of a hunter who has been successful in killing game and whose captive soul subsequently animates the nkondi figure. Based on this process, Gell writes that the nkondi is a figure an index of cumulative agency, a "visible knot tying together an invisible skein of spatio-temporal relations" of which participants in the ritual are aware.

== Southern Africa ==
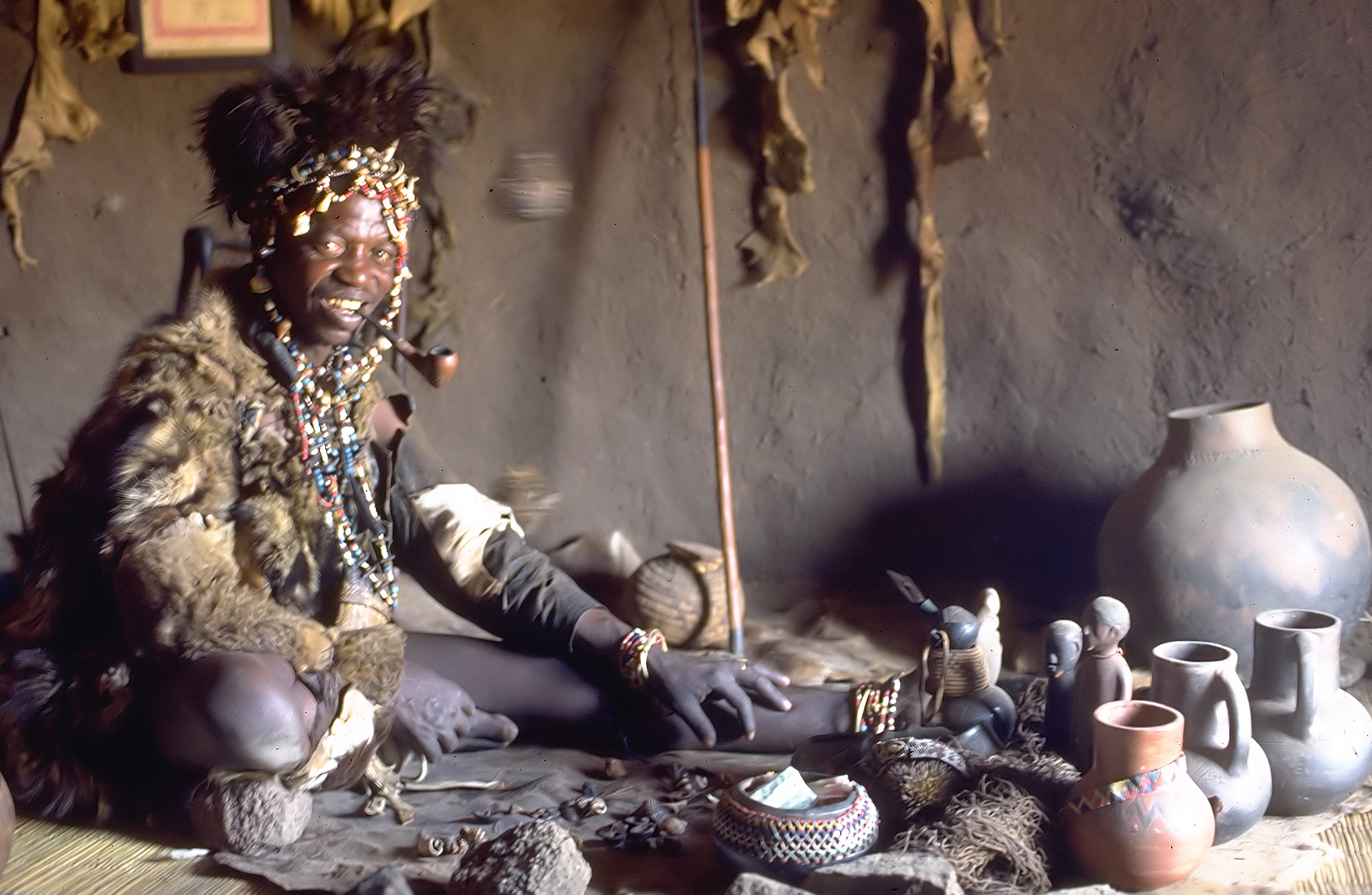
A n'anga, close to Great Zimbabwe

In South Africa, the inyanga has a medicinal role, in contrast to the sangoma, who deals with divination and the ancestral spirits, however, the distinction has become blurred in some areas and many traditional healers tend to practice both arts. In Swahili, mganga refers to a qualified physician or traditional healer.

Among the Shona people of Zimbabwe, a n'anga is a traditional healer who uses a combination of herbs, medical/religious advice and spiritual guidance to heal people. In Zimbabwe, N'angas are recognized and registered under the ZINATHA (Zimbabwe National Traditional Healer's Association).

They are believed to have religious powers to tell fortunes, and to change, heal, bless or even kill people. Traditionally N’angas were people’s main source of help in all matters of life. They have existed for centuries, well before the British colonial era. Guerrilla leaders are said to have consulted with N’angas during the Rhodesian Bush War.

Even today, N'angas are consulted by the people for advice and healing of many illnesses. Sometimes N'angas refer their patients to western medical practitioners and hospitals in case of emergency or illness they cannot cure with the help of their healing spirit.

== The Americas ==
In the United States, nganga, who acted as spiritual leaders, played a key role in Hoodoo practices, which combined Kongo religion, Christianity and indigenous American herbal knowledge.

In Cuba, the term nganga refers to a clay pot or iron cauldron that is kept in the homes of Palo diviners, called paleros. Similar to mojo bags in the United States, these banganga contained items from important places in nature and spiritual items, such as forest dirt, volcanic ash, and the hair, ashes or bones of an ancestor. They were seen as means to honor Nzambi, the mpungo and mfumbi (ancestral spirits), and the forces of nature.

Many inverted positions of capoeira, including bananeira, aú, rabo de arraia, and others, are believed to have originated from the use of handstand by nganga imitating their ancestors, who walked on their hands in the spirit world.

== See also ==
- Traditional African religions
- Traditional healers of South Africa
- Witch doctor
