= Jan Aelbertsz Riethoorn =

Dutch Golden Age painter

Jan Aelbertsz Riethoorn (1620 – 1669), was a Dutch Golden Age painter.

== Biography ==
He lived in Haarlem, where he joined the Haarlem Guild of St. Luke in 1646 and became a pupil of Cornelis Visscher. Later he became the teacher of Abraham de Ridder, who made a portrait of him in 1690. No works survive.
