= Robert Visser =

German merchant, photographer and collector (1860–1937)

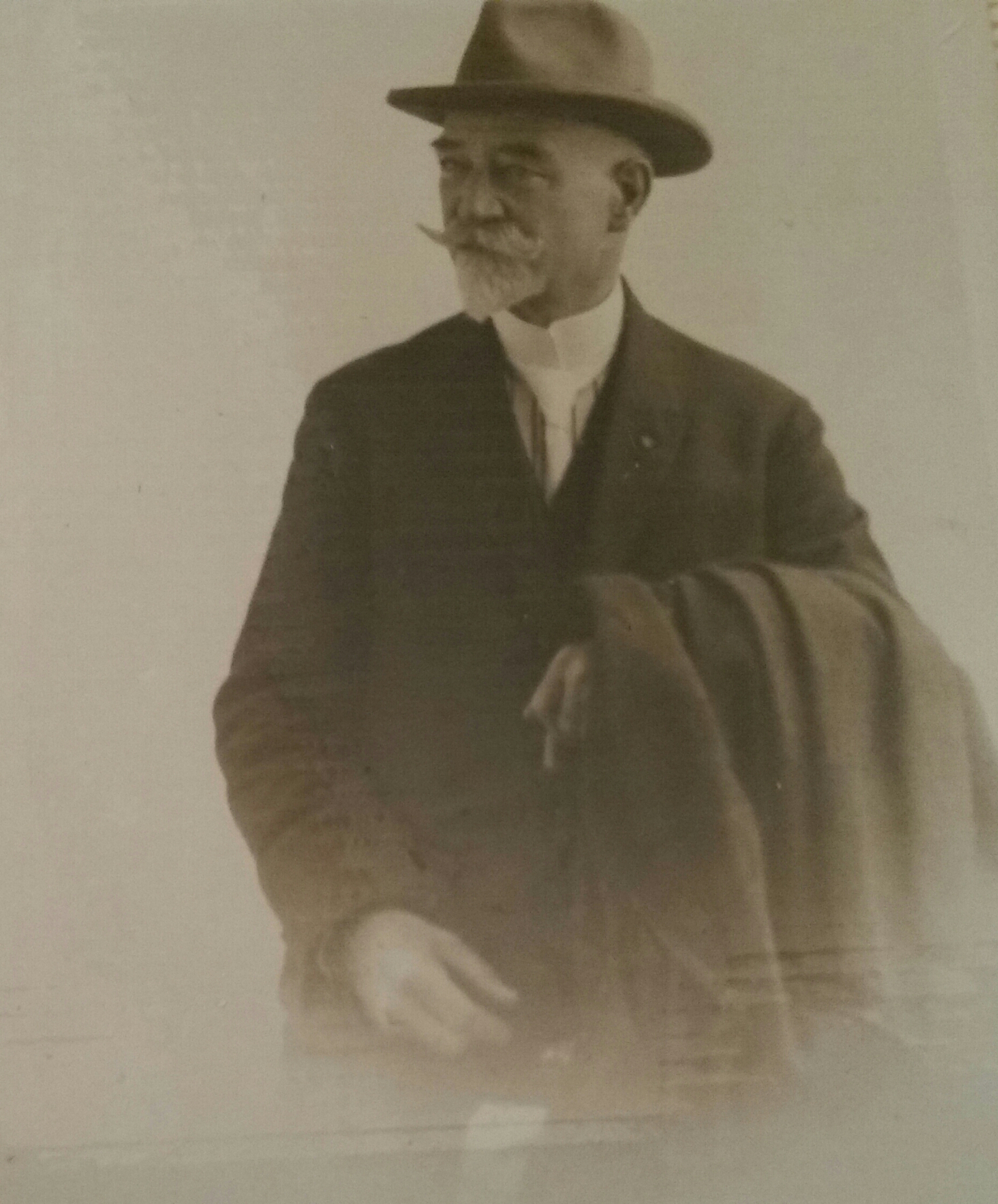
Robert Visser

Carl Friedrich Wilhelm Robert Visser (December 2, 1860 in Düsseldorf – November 19, 1937) was a merchant, photographer and collector of ethnographica.

== Life ==
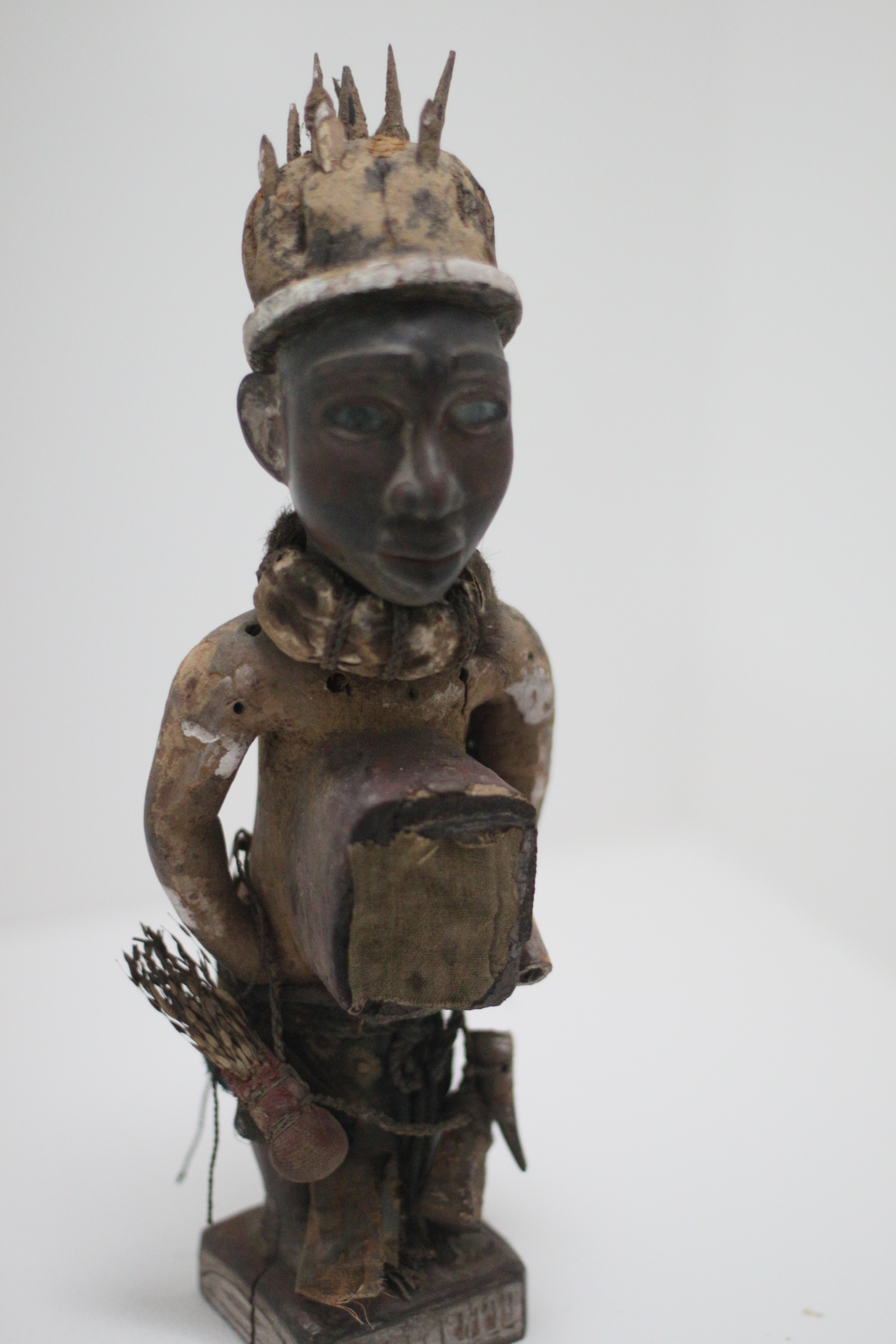
Nkisi (Ethnological Museum Berlin, acquired by Visser)

Robert Visser was the fifth of thirteen children in a Catholic family of merchants and seamen. Upon completing his education, Robert wanted to be a ship's captain. He signed up on a freight steamship in Rotterdam. Stressful experiences on the first trip between the Netherlands and Russia discouraged him pursuing that profession. Instead he took part in a scientific expedition to Brazil, but nothing is known about the purpose, length, or course of that trip. From 1882 to 1904 he was employed as a plantation manager in Africa by the Dutch trading company Nieuwe Afrikaansche Handelsvennootschap. He was active in Cayo, French Congo, from 1882 to at least 1899, in Congo Free State in 1901, and in Chiloango, Portuguese Congo, from 1902 to 1904. By his own account, Visser was one of the first Europeans to establish coffee and cocoa plantations in these regions.

During his residence in Africa he collected a plenitude of ethnographica for the ethnographical museums in Berlin, Leipzig, and Stuttgart. Visser's name is linked primarily with Kongo "fetishes" (minkisi, or power figures; sing. nkisi) that are now in various American (the Art Institute of Chicago, the Detroit Institute of Arts) and German collections. Visser was not only a dedicated collector of ethnographica but also an avid photographer.

In April 1904 Visser returned to Germany and in 1905 married Selma Schobbenhaus, with whom he had a daughter, Sieglinde.

== Photographs by Visser in Congo ==
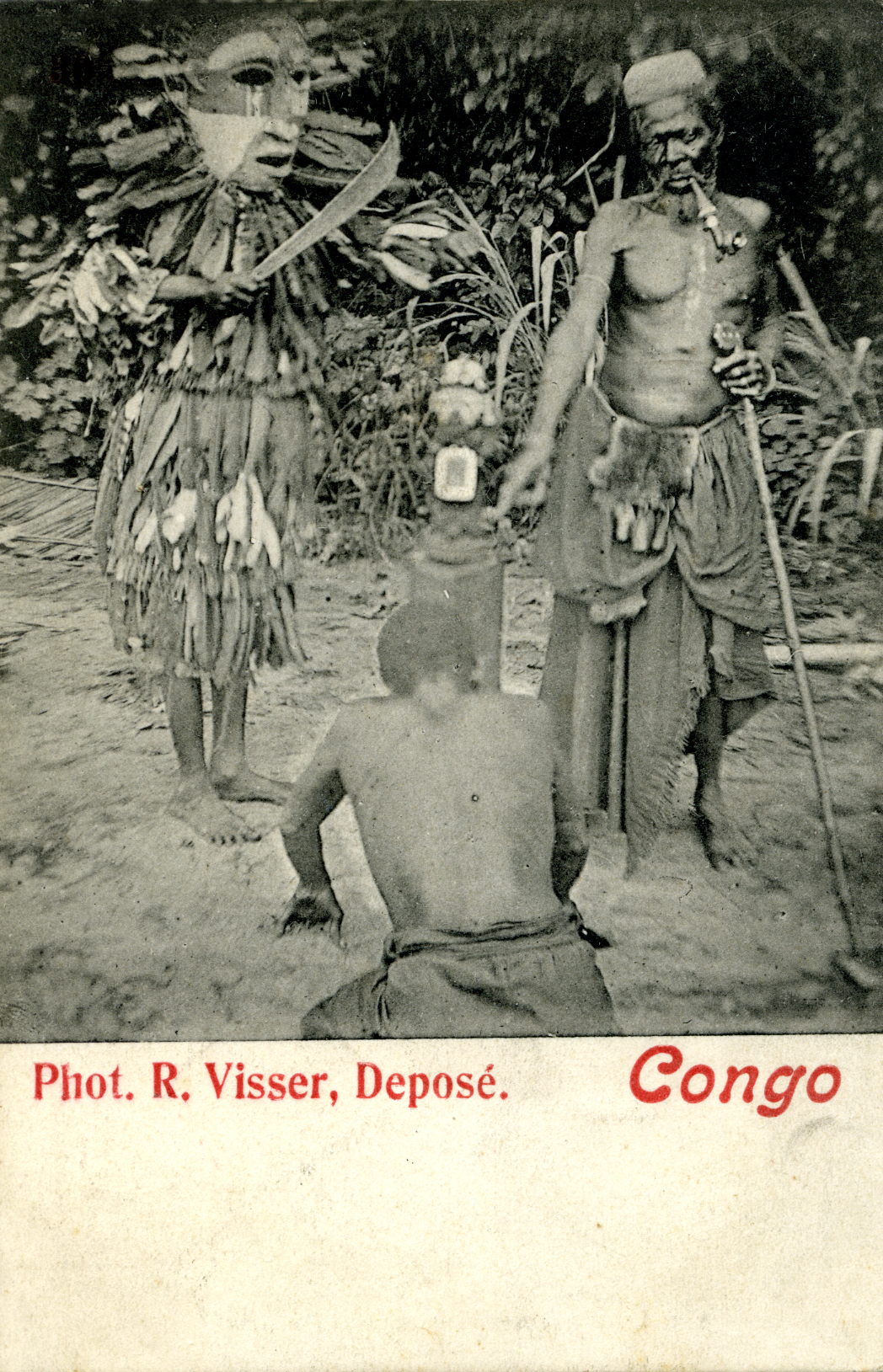

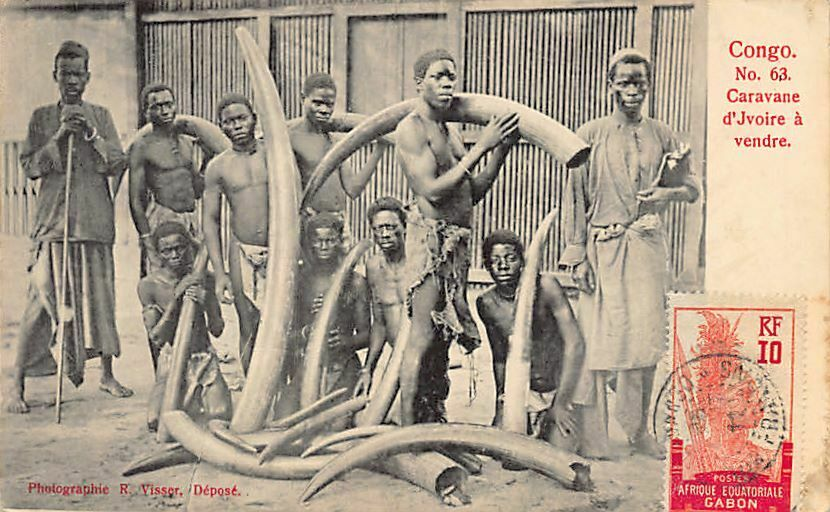

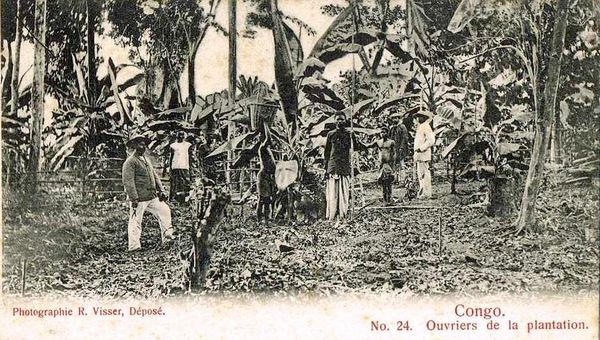

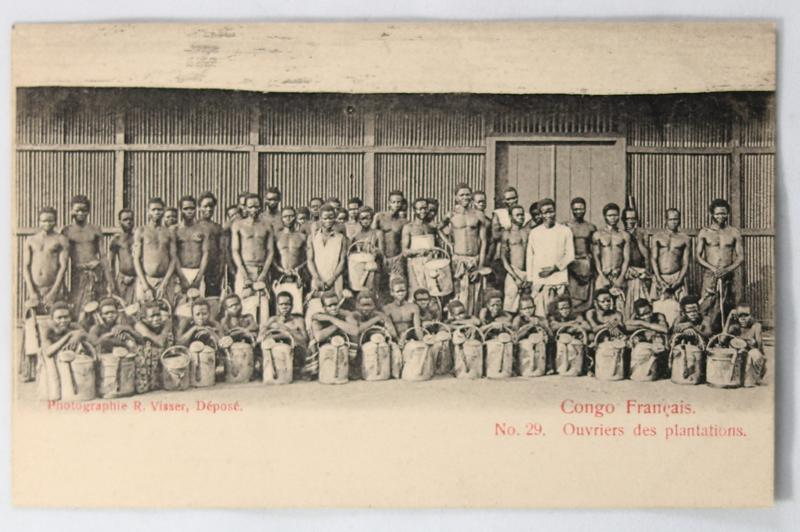
