= Nkisi =

Protective spirits in Bakongo religion

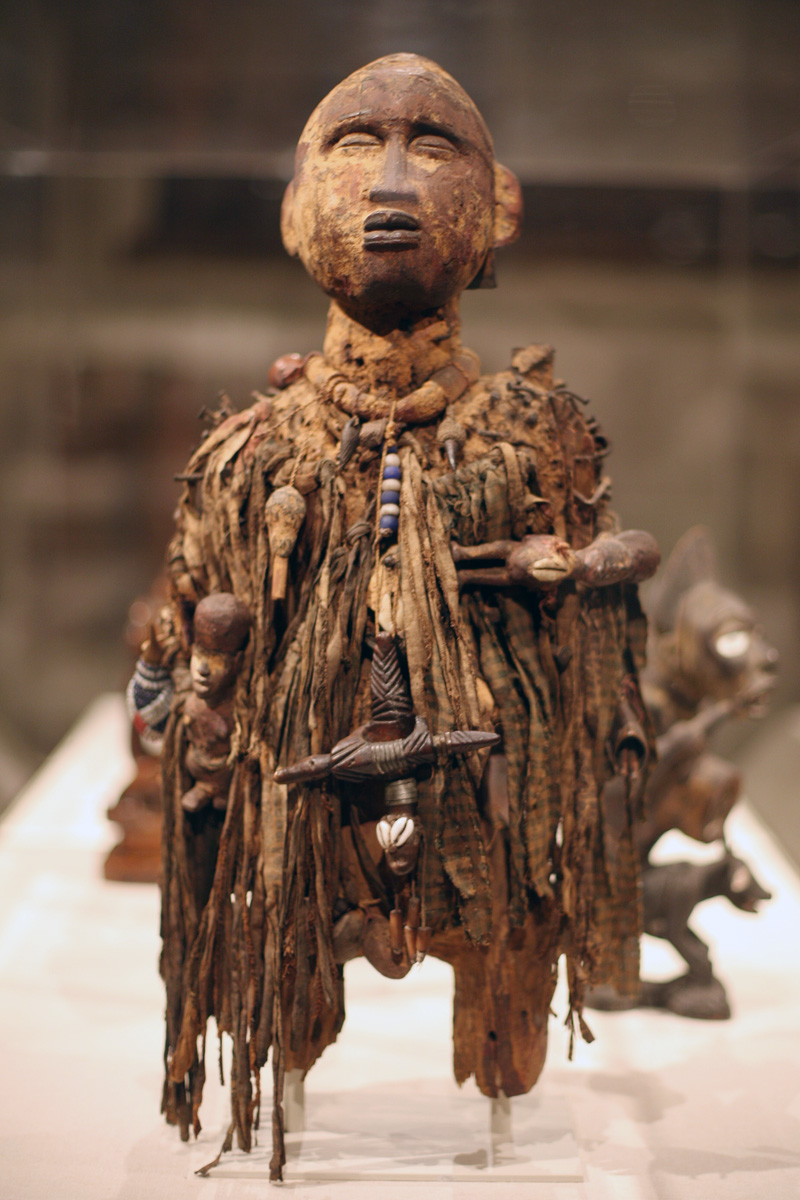
Power Figure: Male (Nkisi). Created circa 1800-1950, DRC, The Metropolitan Museum of Art, New York, The Michael C. Rockefeller Memorial Collection, Bequest of Nelson A. Rockefeller, 1979

Nkisi or Nkishi (plural varies: minkisi, mikisi, zinkisi, or nkisi) are spirits or an object that a spirit inhabits. It is frequently applied to a variety of objects used throughout the Congo Basin in Central Africa, especially in the Territory of Cabinda that are believed to contain spiritual powers or spirits. The term and its concept have passed with the Atlantic slave trade to the Americas.

== Meaning ==
The current meaning of the term derives from the root *-kitį, referring to a spiritual entity or material objects in which it is manifested or inhabits in Proto-Njila, an ancient subdivision of the Bantu language family.

In its earliest attestations in Kikongo dialects in the early seventeenth century, it was transliterated as mokissie in Dutch, as the mu- prefix in this noun class was still pronounced. It was reported by Dutch visitors to Loango, the current territory of Cabinda, in the 1668 book Description of Africa as referring both to a material item and the spiritual entity that inhabits it. In the sixteenth century, when the Kingdom of Kongo was converted to Christianity, ukisi (a substance having characteristics of nkisi) was used to translate holy in the Kikongo Catechism of 1624.

== Use ==
Close communication with ancestors and belief in the efficacy of their powers are closely associated with minkisi in Kongo tradition. Among the peoples of the Congo Basin, especially the Bakongo and the Songye people of Kasai, exceptional human powers are frequently believed to result from some sort of communication with the dead. People known as banganga (singular: nganga) work as healers, diviners, and mediators who defend the living against black magic (witchcraft) and provide them with remedies against diseases resulting either from witchcraft or the demands of bakisi (spirits), emissaries from the land of the dead.

Banganga harness the powers of bakisi and the dead by making minkisi. Minkisi are primarily containers – ceramic vessels, gourds, animal horns, shells, bundles, or any other object that can contain spiritually charged substances. Even graves themselves, as the home of the dead and hence the home of bakisi, can be considered as minkisi. In fact, minkisi have even been described as portable graves, and many include earth or relics from the grave of a powerful individual as a prime ingredient. The powers of the dead thus infuse the object and allow the nganga to control it. The metal objects commonly pounded into the surface of the power figures represent the minkisi's active roles during rituals or ceremonies. Each nail or metal piece represents a vow, a signed treaty, and an effort to abolish evil. Ultimately, these figures most commonly represent reflections upon socially unacceptable behaviors and efforts to correct them.

Often, people would seek aid through minkisi. In order to do so, an individual would have to seek the guidance of a nganga. The nganga would proceed using their ability to intervene with minkisi on behalf of the person seeking aid.

The substances chosen for inclusion in minkisi are frequently called bilongo or milongo (singular nlongo), a word often translated as 'medicine'. However, their operation is not primarily pharmaceutical, as they are not applied to or ingested by those who are sick, and perhaps bilongo is more accurately translated as 'therapeutic substances'. Rather they are frequently chosen for metaphoric reasons, for example, bird claws in order to catch wrongdoers or because their names resemble characteristics of spirits in question.

Among the many common materials used in the minkisi were fruit (luyala in Kikongo), charcoal (kalazima), and mushrooms (tondo). Minerals were collected from various places associated with the dead, such as earth collected from graves and riverbeds. White clay was also very important in the composition of minkisi due to the symbolic relationship of the color white and the physical aspects of dead skin as well as their moral rightness and spiritual positivity. White contrasted with black, the color of negativity. Some minkisi use red ochre as a coloring agent. The use of red is symbolic of the mediation of the powers of the dead.

Minkisi serve many purposes. Some are used in divination practices, rituals to eradicate evil or punish wrong-doers, and ceremonies for protective installments. Many are also used for healing, while others provide success in hunting or trade, among other things. Important minkisi are often credited with powers in multiple domains. Most famously, minkisi may also take the form of anthropomorphic or zoomorphic wooden carvings.

== Types ==
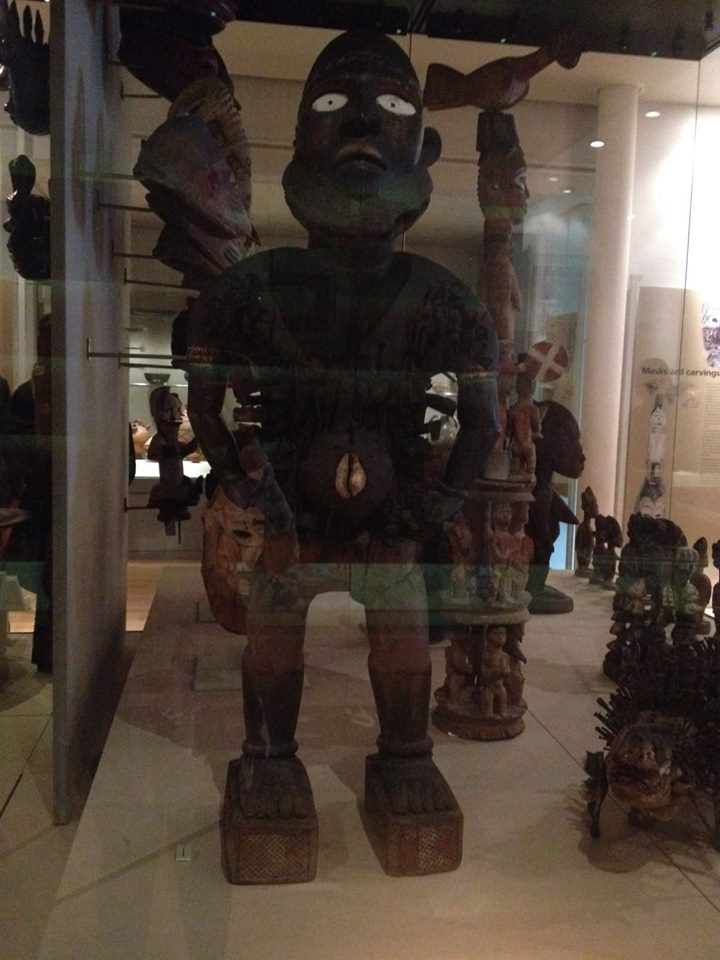
Nkisi Mangaaka power figure in Manchester Museum

Minkisi and the afflictions associated with them are generally classified into two types; the "of the above" and the "of the below". The above minkisi are associated with the sky, rain, and thunderstorms. The below minkisi are associated with the earth and waters on land. The above minkisi were considered masculine and were closely tied to violence and violent forces. The minkisi of the above were largely used to maintain order, serve justice, and seal treaties.

Birds of prey, lightning, weapons, and fire are all common themes among the minkisi of the above. They also affected the upper body. Head, neck, and chest pains were said to be caused by these nkisi figures. Some figures were in the form of animals. Most often these were dogs (kozo). Dogs are closely tied to the spiritual world in Kongo mythology. They live in two separate worlds; the village of the living, and the forest of the dead. Kozo figures were often portrayed as having two heads – this was symbolic of their ability to see both worlds.

Na monanga are associated with a powerful person, with great reasoning, bringing happiness and fortune. They often were created carefully, have a tranquil expression, and are covered in decorations consisting of different substances.

Npezo figures are crafted to look menacing and are believed to have their powers weakened by laughter.

There is also a difference between personal, and community nkisi. Personal nkisi figures were much more anonymous. They often were kept within a private domicile. While community mankishi on the other hand were much less anonymous, often times overlooking the village in a way to intentionally be visible to many in the village. They were meant to be visible, but often times were kept inside their own personal enclosure during the daytime.

== Nkondi ==
Nkondi (plural forms minkondi, zinkondi) are a subclass of minkisi that are considered aggressive. Because many of the nkondi collected in the nineteenth century were activated by hammered nails, they were often called "nail fetishes" in travel writing, museum catalogs, and art history literature. Many nkondi also feature reflective surfaces, such as mirrors, on their stomach areas or eyes, held to be the means of vision in the spirit world. They are often decorated with tubes containing various substances, most commonly gunpowder for killing ndoki, who is associated with the powers of a witch.Although they can be made in many forms, the ones featuring a human statue with nails are the most described in anthropological and scholarly literature.

Nkondi are invoked to search out wrongdoing, enforce oaths, and cause or cure sicknesses. Perhaps the most common use was the locating and punishing of criminals, by hunting down wrongdoers and to avenging their crimes. An oath taker may declare him or herself vulnerable to the disease caused by an nkondi should he or she violate the oath. People who fall sick with diseases known to be associated with a particular nkondi may need to consult the nganga responsible for mediating with that spirit to determine how to be cured.

Although nkisi nkondi have probably been made since at least the sixteenth century, the specifically nailed figures, which have been the object of collection in Western museums, nailed nkondi were probably made primarily in the northern part of the Kongo cultural zone in the nineteenth and early twentieth centuries.

== Modern impact ==
The nkisi figures acquired by the Europeans in the nineteenth century caused great interest in stimulating emerging trends in modern art and Bantu themes previously considered primitive or gruesome were now viewed as aesthetically interesting. The pieces became influential in art circles and many were acquired by art museums. The intentions of the banganga who created minkisi were practical; that is, their characteristics were dictated by the need of the object to do the work it was required to do. Hence the nails that caused a sensation were never seen as decorative items but as a requirement of awakening the spirit or the gestures were part of a substantial metaphor of gestures found in Kongo culture.

Recently some modern artists have also been interested in creating nkisi of their own, most notably Renee Stout, whose exhibition "Astonishment and Power" at the Smithsonian Institution coupled her own versions of nkisi with a commentary by noted anthropologist Wyatt MacGaffey.

The Republic of the Congo artist Trigo Piula painted several items in a "New Fetish" series, due to the rebuffing of traditional fetishes by people. It "is a way of engaging with my community and a way of denouncing things that I believe are impacting us, like television for example", he said.

== Gallery ==
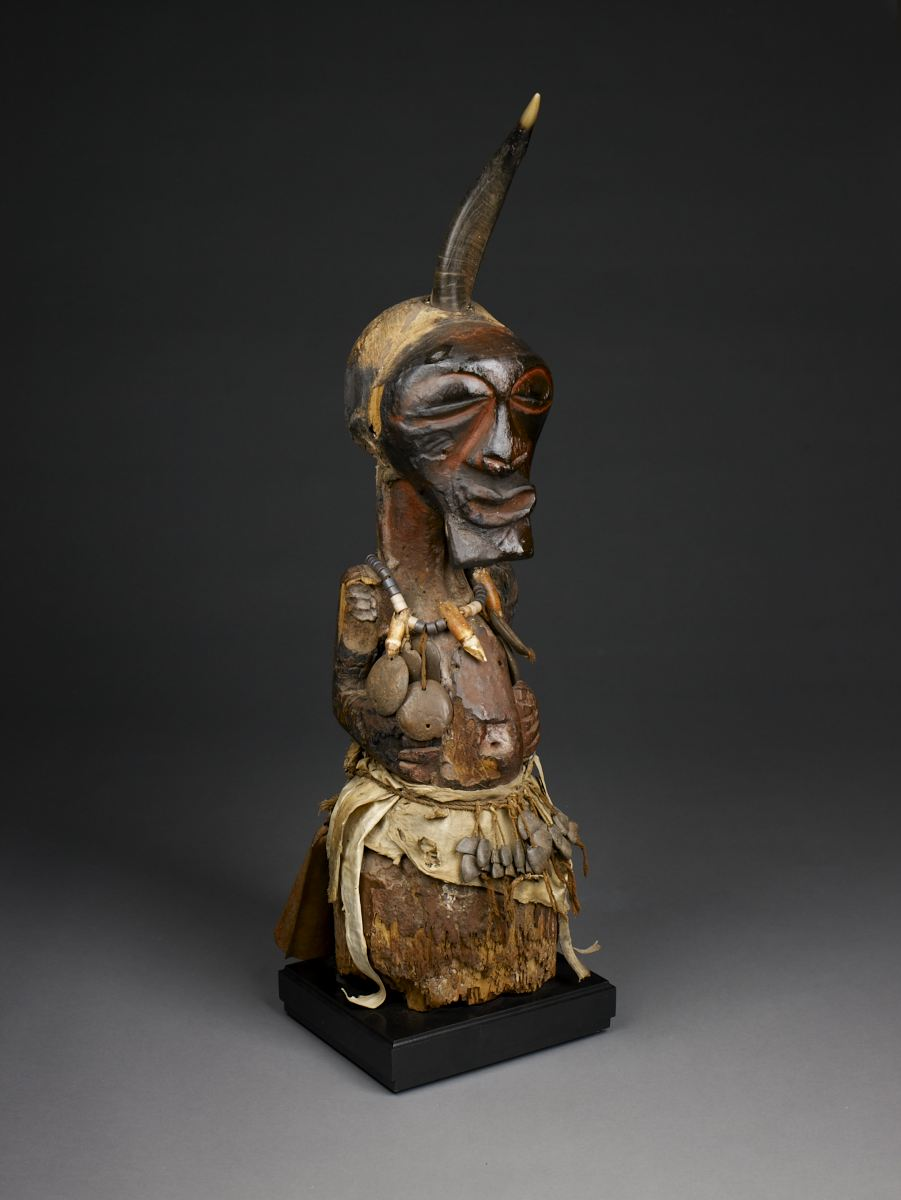
A male nkisi of the Songye in the collection of the Birmingham Museum of Art

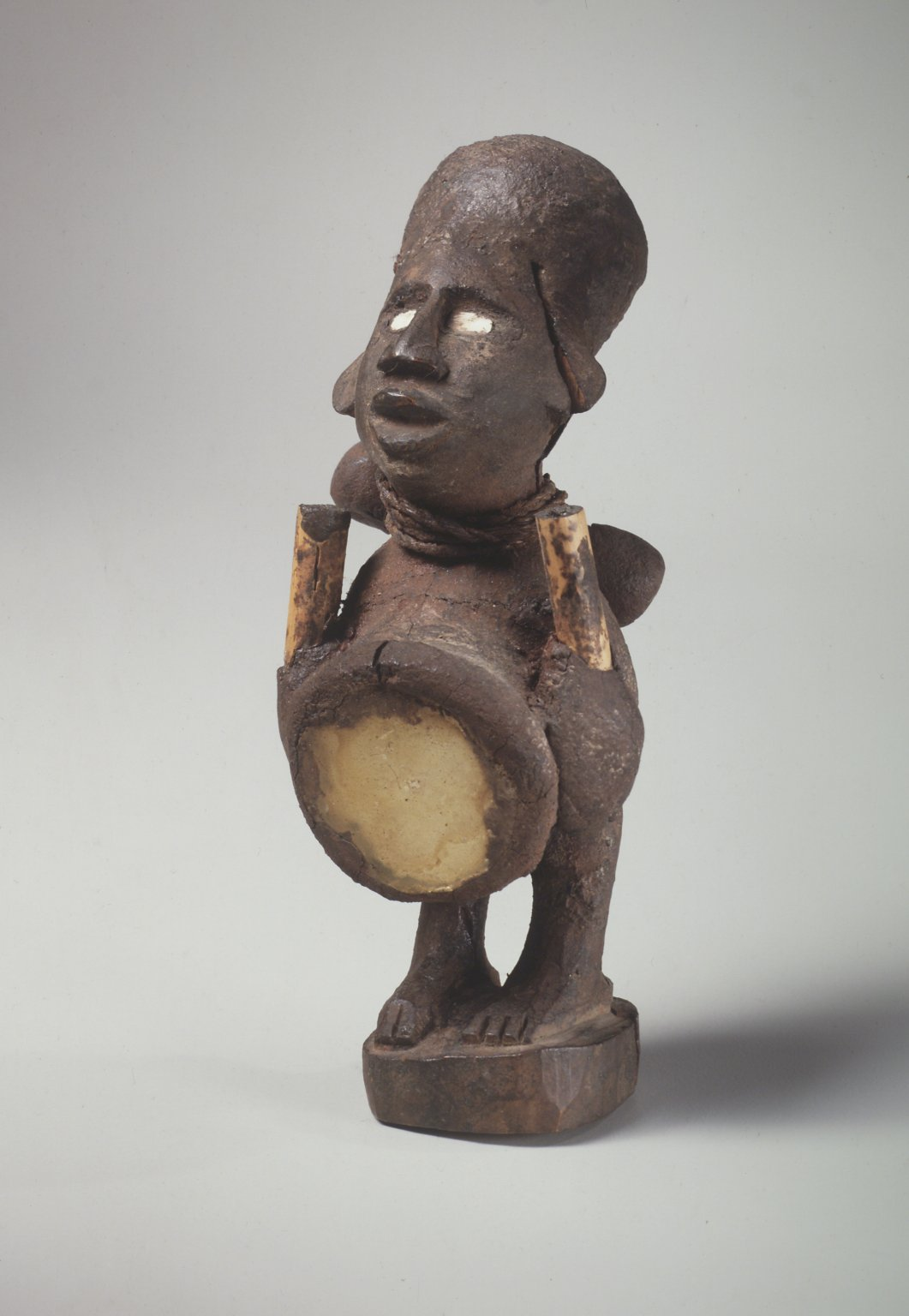
Nkisi figure, from the collection of the Brooklyn Museum

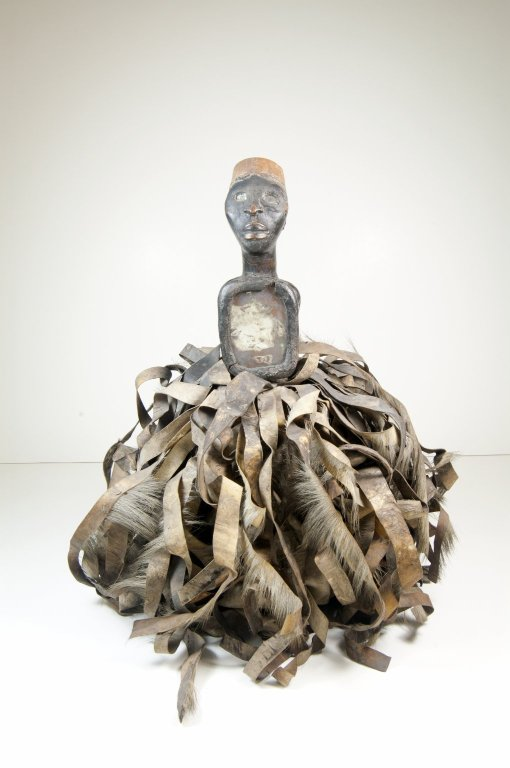
Male Nkisi Figure with Strips of Hide, from the collection of the Brooklyn Museum

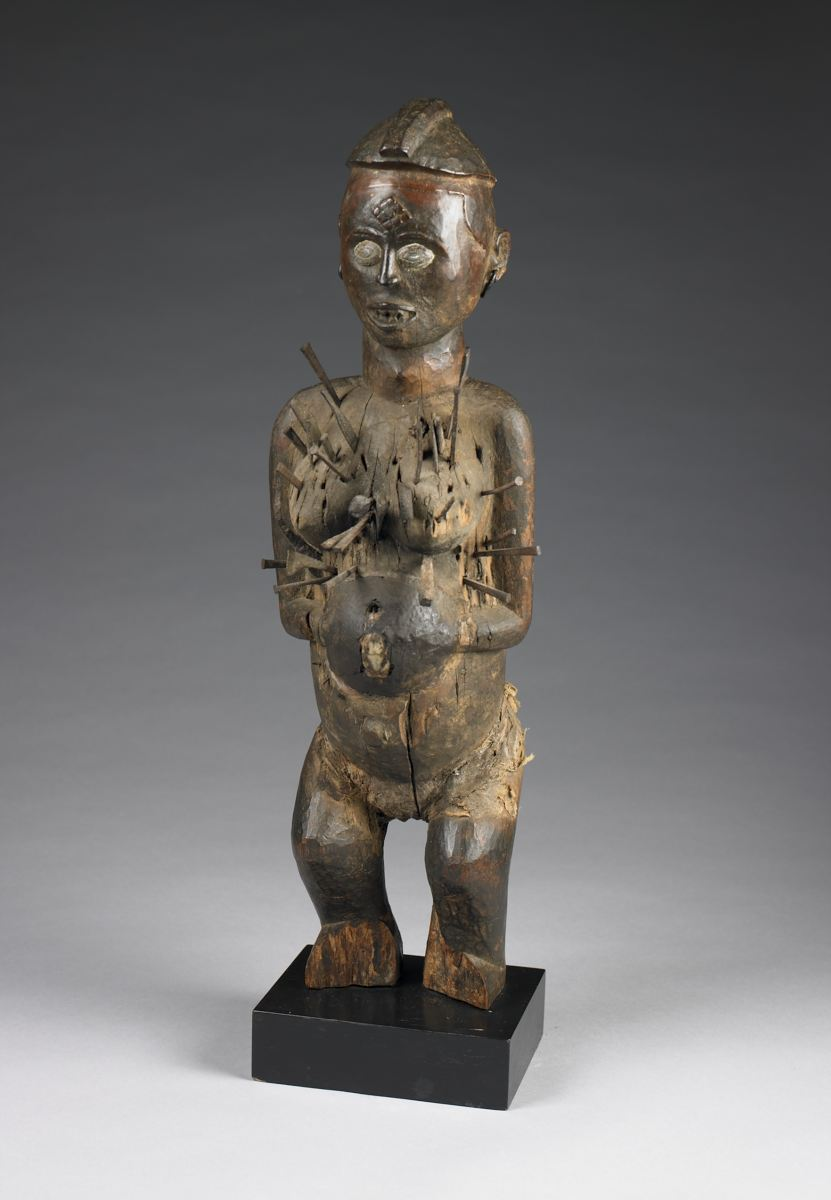
Female Nkisi Nkonde at the Birmingham Museum of Art

== See also ==
- Kongo mythology

== Bibliography ==
- Bassani, Ezio (1977). "Kongo Nail Fetishes from the Chiloango River Area," African Arts 10: 36-40
- Doutreloux, A. (1961). "Magie Yombe," Zaire 15: 45-57.
- Dupré, Marie-Claude (1975). "Les système des forces nkisi chez le Kongo d'après le troisième volume de K. Laman," Africa 45: 12-28.
- Janzen, John and Wyatt MacGaffey (1974). An Anthology of Kongo Religion Lawrence, KS: University of Kansas Press.
- Laman, Karl (1953–68). The Kongo 4 volumes, Uppsala: Studia Ethnografica Uppsaliensia.
- Lecomte Alain. Raoul Lehuard. Arts, Magie te Médecine en Afrique noire. Edition A. Lecomte. 2008
- Lehuard, Raoul. (1980). Fétiches à clou a Bas-Zaire. Arnouville.
- MacGaffey, Wyatt, and John Janzen (1974). "Nkisi Figures of the BaKongo," African Arts 7: 87-89.
- MacGaffey, Wyatt (1977). "Fetishism Revisted: Kongo nkisi in Sociological Perspective." Africa 47: 140-152.
- MacGaffey, Wyatt (1988). "Complexity, Astonishment and Power: The Visual Vocabulary of Kongo Minkisi" Journal of Southern African Studies14: 188-204.
- MacGaffey, Wyatt, ed. and transl. (1991), Art and Healing of the Bakongo Commented Upon by Themselves Bloomington, IN: Indiana University Press.
- MacGaffey, Wyatt. "The Eyes of Understanding: Kongo Minkisi," in Wyatt MacGaffey and M. Harris, eds, Astonishment and Power Washington, DC: Smithsonian Institution Press, pp. 21–103.
- MacGaffey, Wyatt (1998). "'Magic, or as we usually say 'Art': A Framework for Comparing African and European Art," in Enid Schildkrout and Curtis Keim, eds. The Scramble for Art in Central Africa. Cambridge and New York: Cambridge University Press, pp. 217–235.
- MacGaffey, Wyatt (2000). Religion and Society in Central Africa: The BaKongo of Lower Zaire Chicago: University of Chicago Press.
- MacGaffey, Wyatt (2000). Kongo Political Culture: The Conceptual Challenge of the Particular. Bloomington: Indiana University Press.
- Vanhee, Hein (2000). "Agents of Order and Disorder: Kongo Minkisi," in Karel Arnaut, ed. Revisions: New Perspectives on African Collections of the Horniman Museum. London and Coimbra, pp. 89–106.
- Van Wing, Joseph (1959). Etudes Bakongo Brussels: Descleė de Brouwer.
- Volavkova, Zdenka (1972). "Nkisi Figures of the Lower Congo" African Arts 5: 52-89.
