= Margreet Vissers =

New Zealand biochemist

Margreet Catherina Maria Vissers
- Education: University of Otago
- Scientific career
- Fields: Biochemistry, Free radicals
- Workplaces: University of Otago
- Thesis: The Effects of neutrophil oxidants and proteinases on the degradation of glomerular basement membrane : implications for inflammatory tissue damage

Margreet Catherina Maria Vissers is a New Zealand biochemistry academic, and as of 2019 is a full professor at the University of Otago.

== Academic career ==
After a PhD titled 'The Effects of neutrophil oxidants and proteinases on the degradation of glomerular basement membrane : implications for inflammatory tissue damage ' at the University of Otago, Vissers joined the staff, rising to full professor.

Vissers' research includes looking at Vitamin C's impact on immune cells and cancer.

== Selected works ==
- Kuiper, Caroline, Ilona GM Molenaar, Gabi U. Dachs, Margaret J. Currie, Peter H. Sykes, and Margreet CM Vissers. "Low ascorbate levels are associated with increased hypoxia-inducible factor-1 activity and an aggressive tumor phenotype in endometrial cancer." Cancer research 70, no. 14 (2010): 5749–5758.
- Carr, Anitra C., Stephanie M. Bozonet, Juliet M. Pullar, Jeremy W. Simcock, and Margreet CM Vissers. "Human skeletal muscle ascorbate is highly responsive to changes in vitamin C intake and plasma concentrations." The American journal of clinical nutrition 97, no. 4 (2013): 800–807.
- Brunetti-Pierri, Nicola, Gary E. Stapleton, Mark Law, John Breinholt, Donna J. Palmer, Yu Zuo, Nathan C. Grove et al. "Efficient, long-term hepatic gene transfer using clinically relevant HDAd doses by balloon occlusion catheter delivery in nonhuman primates." Molecular Therapy 17, no. 2 (2009): 327–333.
- Kuiper, Caroline, Gabi U. Dachs, Margaret J. Currie, and Margreet CM Vissers. "Intracellular ascorbate enhances hypoxia-inducible factor (HIF)-hydroxylase activity and preferentially suppresses the HIF-1 transcriptional response." Free Radical Biology and Medicine 69 (2014): 308–317.
- Carr, Anitra C., Margreet Vissers, and John S. Cook. "The effect of intravenous vitamin C on cancer-and chemotherapy-related fatigue and quality of life." Frontiers in oncology 4 (2014): 283.
