= Free Radical Biology and Medicine =

- Discipline: Free radicals biology
- Language: English
- Edited by: Kelvin Davies

Publication details
- Publisher: Elsevier (Netherlands)
- Frequency: Biweekly
- Impact factor: 7.376 (2020)

Standard abbreviations
- ISO 4: Free Radic. Biol. Med.

Indexing
- CODEN: FRBMEH
- ISSN: 0891-5849 (print); 1873-4596 (web)
- LCCN: 87644713
- OCLC no.: 14917670

Links
- Journal homepage; Online access

Free Radical Biology and Medicine is a peer-reviewed scientific journal and official journal of the Society for Redox Biology and Medicine. The journal covers research on redox biology, signaling, biological chemistry and medical implications of free radicals, reactive species, oxidants and antioxidants.
