= Jan de Visscher =

Dutch Golden Age engraver

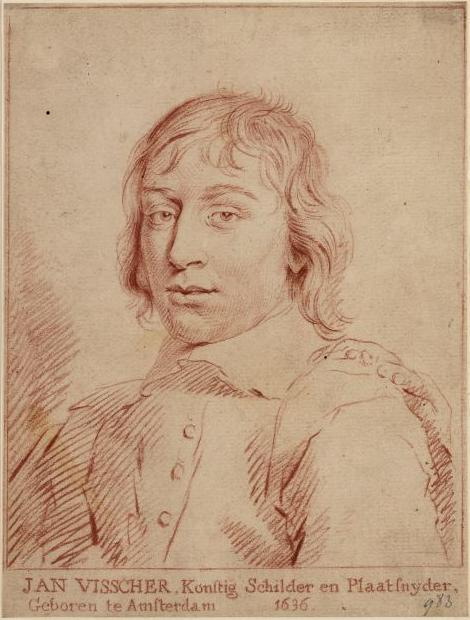
Engraved portrait of Jan de Visscher after a self-portrait, by Cornelis van Noorde in 1775

Jan de Visscher (ca.1636, Haarlem – 1692-1712, Amsterdam), was a Dutch Golden Age engraver who became a painter in later life.

== Biography ==
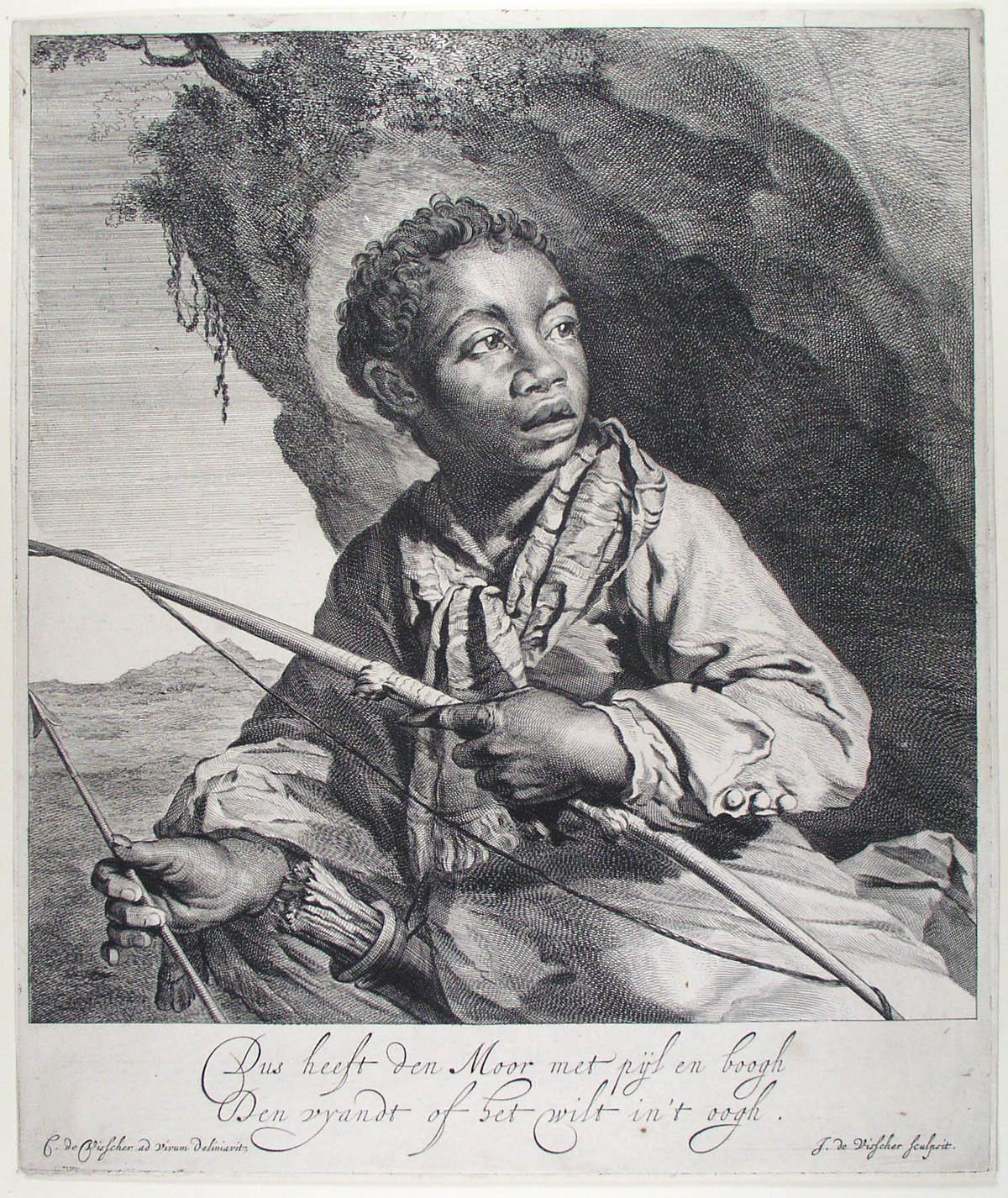
The Moor, an etching after a drawing by his brother Cornelis

According to Houbraken he was an able etcher who made famous prints (in his lifetime) after the works of Philips Wouwerman and Nicolaes Pietersz Berchem, and who became an able pupil of the landscape painter Michiel Carrée aged 56. Houbraken spoke to Michiel Carrée personally about his art, who claimed that Visscher became as good as he was at Italianate landscapes. No paintings by Visscher's hand are known today, but he made many prints after various famous painters from Haarlem such as Berchem, Adriaen van Ostade, Jan van Goyen, and his brother Cornelis. Houbraken mentioned Jan Visser from Haarlem with the nickname Slempop at another point in his book, in his biographical sketch of "P. Molyn", son of Pieter de Molijn. This Jan Visser visited the Haarlem-born Molyn II when he was in prison in Genua for 16 years for murdering his wife.

According to the RKD Jan de Visscher had two brothers, Cornelis Visscher and Lambert de Visscher. He was registered in Amsterdam in 1692, but his death was not recorded. Since he is referred to in the past tense when Houbraken was writing, he is assumed to have died before 1712.
