= De Visser =

de Visser is a Dutch occupational surname meaning "the fisherman". Notable people with that name include:

- Eefje de Visser (born 1986), Dutch singer-songwriter
- Johannes Theodoor de Visser (1857–1932), Dutch Minister of Science and Education
- Piet de Visser (football manager) (born 1934), Dutch football manager
- Piet de Visser (politician) (1931–2012), Dutch politician
