= Lambert Visscher =

Dutch Golden Age printmaker

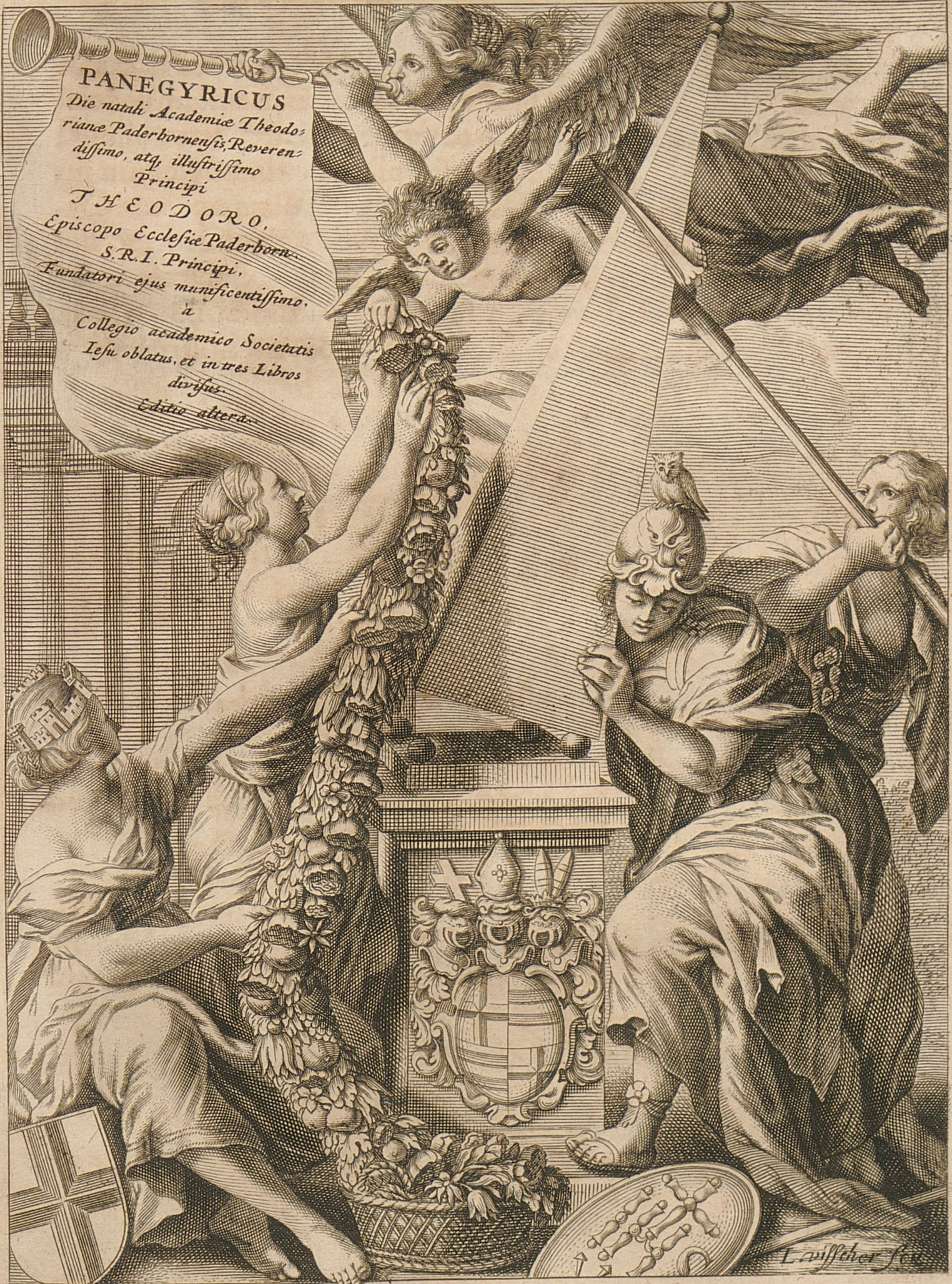
Frontispiece to Ferdinand von Fürstenberg's Monumenta Paderbornensia, 1672

Lambert Visscher (1633, Haarlem – after 1690, Italy), was a Dutch Golden Age printmaker.

== Biography ==
According to Houbraken he was the brother of Jan and Cornelis who became a renowned engraver and travelled to Italy, where he died.

According to the RKD he was active in Amsterdam from 1666 to 1673. In 1673 he travelled to Italy, where he died after 1690, perhaps in Florence or Rome.
