= Cornelis Visscher =

Dutch Golden Age engraver (1629–1658)

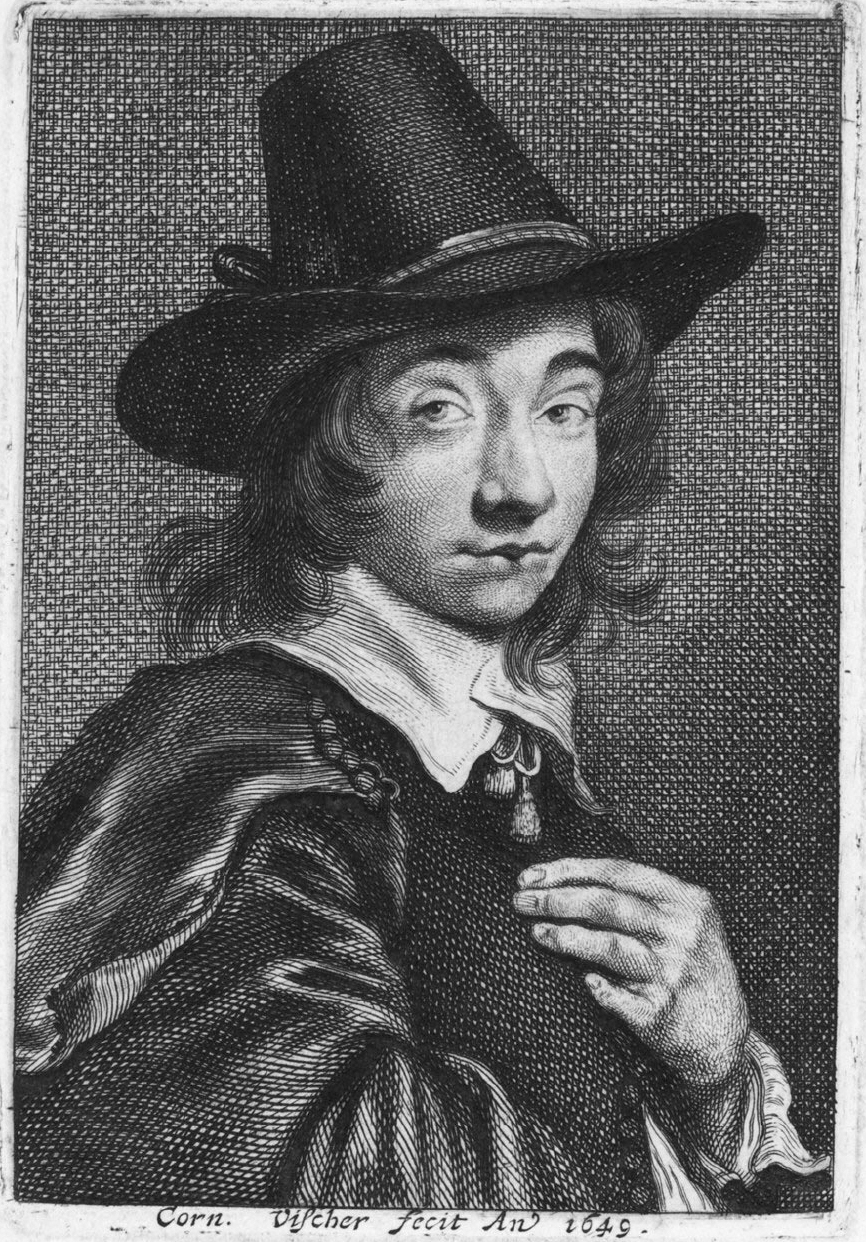
Self-portrait (1649)

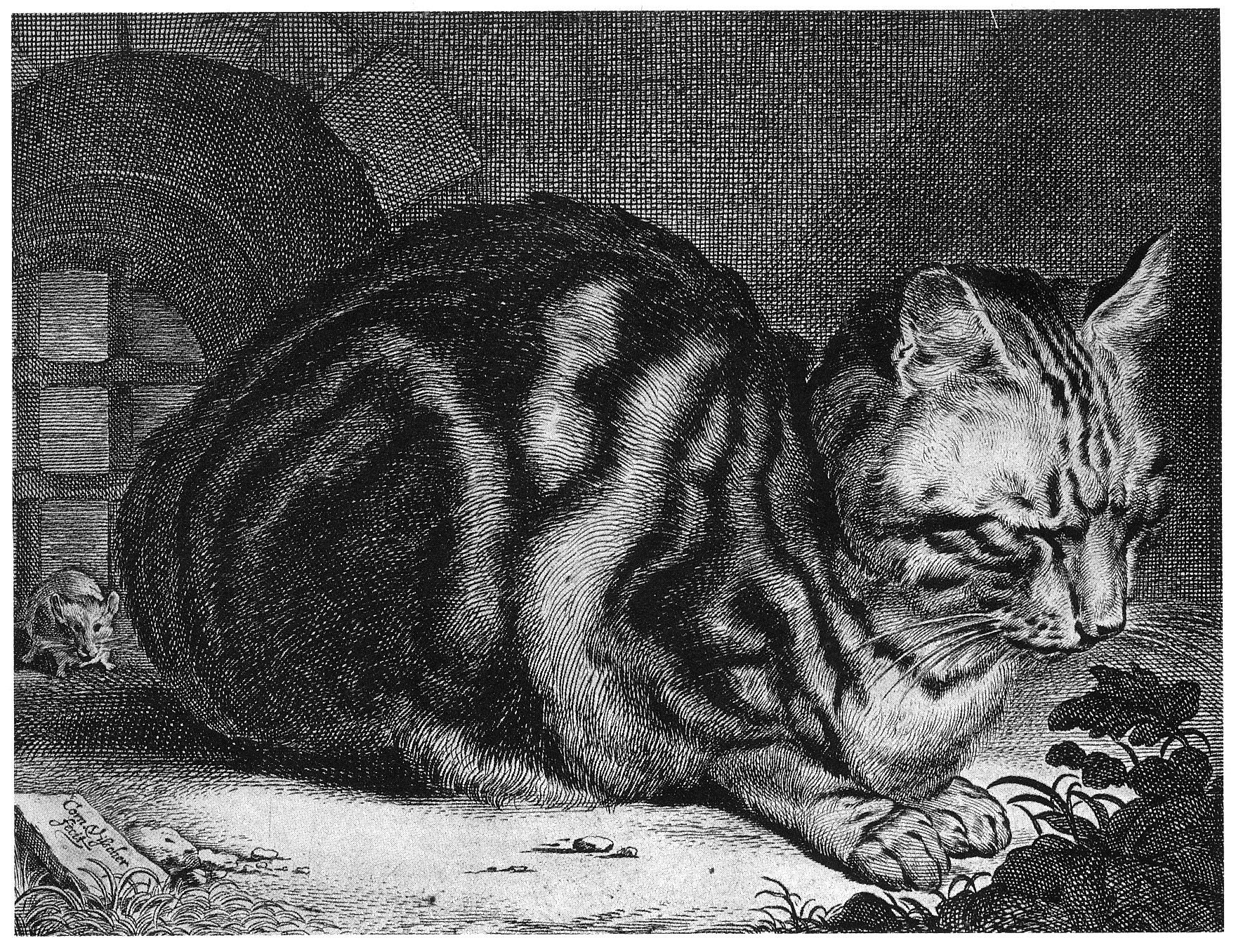
Cat Sleeping, 1657

Cornelis Visscher (1629 in Haarlem – 1658 in Haarlem), was a Dutch Golden Age engraver and the brother of Jan de Visscher and Lambert Visscher.

== Biography ==
According to Houbraken he was an able etcher who made famous prints (in his lifetime), and who had an unusual talent for drawing after a live model with charcoal that was unparalleled. Houbraken mentioned that his works could be seen in the collection of the rich Dutch East India Company director and art collector in Amsterdam who had a large art cabinet, Jeronimus Tonneman. Prints by Visscher's hand were made after various famous painters from Haarlem such as Nicolaes Berchem, Adriaen van Ostade, Pieter van Laer and Adriaen Brouwer.

Visscher created images of notables like Louis de Boisot, Admiral of the Geuzen.

According to the RKD he had two brothers, Jan de Visscher and Lambert Visscher (1633-ca.1690), and he was the pupil of Pieter Claesz Soutman. He made a series of portraits in print of religious figures from Amsterdam and Haarlem. He joined the Haarlem Guild of St. Luke in 1653. He influenced Dirk Helmbreker and Cornelis Bega. His pupil was Jan Aelbertsz Riethoorn.

== Other Cornelis Visscher ==
Houbraken mentions Kornelis de Visscher from Hamburg, a popular engraver in Amsterdam, who drowned at sea. This other Cornelis Visscher is known in the RKD as Cornelis de Visscher who painted portraits that were later engraved by others. He drowned at sea in 1586 on the way back from Hamburg. He was originally from Gouda.

Cornelis de Bie mentions a Cornelis Visscher who included fishermen in his engravings. This was done by the famous mapmaker Visscher family and was started by Claes Jansz Visscher. It is unknown whether the Haarlem and Gouda Cornelis Visschers were related to the Amsterdam mapmaking family. However, De Bie corrected the name on p. 524 to 'Jan Claessen de Visscher'
