= List of Yoruba deities =

The Yoruba people are a major ethnic group indigenous to West Africa, whose religion—often called Isese—recognizes a number of deities and other divine forces. Yoruba deities include the Oriṣa and Ajogun ("personified evils"). In addition, the Yoruba acknowledge a supreme being, often called Olorun, who is not typically classed as an Orisa.

Many deities recognized by the Yoruba are shared with peoples such as the Fon, as well as with diasporic African populations who were enslaved and/or otherwise moved to the Americas during the years of the Atlantic slave trade and afterwards during the 19th century.

== The Oriṣa ==
| Name | Description | Gender |
|---|---|---|
| Agemo | Chameleon servant of the supreme being Ọlọrun. Carries messages between the Oriṣa and Ọlọrun. | Male |
| Aganjú | Deity of volcanoes, the wilderness, deserts and fire. Son of Ajaka and nephew of Shango. | Male |
| Ajaka | Deity associated with fire and thief-catching. He is the elder brother of his near polar opposite Shango. He was an Alaafin of Oyo before he died and was deified. | Male |
| Ààjà | Forest spirit of the whirlwind and wife of Àrọ̀nì. | Female |
| Ajé | Deity of wealth, property, prosperity, fortune and success; strongly associated with Olokun. | Female |
| Àyàn Àgalú | Patron deity of all drummers. | Male |
| Ara (Aramfẹ/Ara-gbona) | Deity of the weather, storms and thunder. | Genderless |
| Ayelala | Deity of justice, oaths and retribution. | Female |
| Ayé | Deity of the Earth, passion, environmentalism and nature. | Female |
| Biri | Deity of darkness, night, and midnight. | Male |
| Babalu Aye | Deity of smallpox, epidemic disease and healing. | Male |
| Bayanni (Dada) | Deity of justice, children, vegetables, abundance, peace, wisdom and locked hair. | Male |
| Erinlẹ | Deity of hunting and abundance. Described as "great elephant of the Earth". | Male |
| Eṣu | Deity of crossroads, trickery, chaos and travelers. Acts as an intermediary between humans and Oriṣa | Male or Androgynous |
| Ibeji (Taiwo and Kehinde) | Twin deities of duality, playfulness, mischief, abundance and twins. Children of Shango. | Male and/or Female |
| Iroko | Tree deity and king of forest spirits (iwin). | Genderless |
| Iya Nla | Primordial Spirit | Female |
| Logun Edé | Deity of forests and rivers, war and hunting, youth, grace and balance. Child of Oṣosi and Oṣun, possesses qualities of both. | Male or Androgynous |
| Moremi | Deified and legendary Queen who saved Ile-Ife from raiders. | Female |
| Ọbà | River deity of homemaking, domesticity and marriage. First wife of Shango. | Female |
| Obaluaye | Deity of the Earth; strongly associated with infectious disease and healing. | Male |
| Ọbalufọn | Deified legendary king of the Ife Empire; associated with weaving, art, bronze and brass casting, royalty and wealth. | Male |
| Obatala | Deity of creation, purity, creativity, wisdom and the disabled; credited for creating the Earth and humans. King of the Oriṣa. | Male (commonly) or Female |
| Oduduwa | Warrior deity said to be the progenitor of the Yoruba. Some versions of the creation story describe him as brother of Obatala. | Male (commonly) or Female |
| Ogun | Deity of war, soldiers, dogs, blacksmiths, iron, craftsmen and metalworkers. Described as one of the most powerful and respected Oriṣa. Often seen as a rival of Shango. | Male |
| Oke | Deity of mountains, hills and heights. | Male |
| Oko | Deity of agriculture, farming and fertility. | Male |
| Olokun | Deity of oceans, water, health and wealth. They are the head of all water deities and one of the most powerful Oriṣa. Strongly associated with Aje, the deity of riches. | Male, Female or Androgynous. |
| Olumo | Mountain deity linked with the Olumo Rock. Worshipped primarily by the Egba people of Abeokuta. | Genderless |
| Ọranyan | Legendary king of Ifẹ who founded the Oyo Empire. Husband of Queen Moremi, father of Shango and Ajaka, grandson of Oduduwa. He was deified after his death. | Male |
| Orò | Deity of bullroarers and communal justice. | Male |
| Oronsen | Deity who married the human king Rerengejen of Owo. | Female |
| Ọrunmila | Deity of wisdom, knowledge, Ifá divination, philosophy, fate, destiny, prophecy, and babalawos. All-seeing; credited with revelation of the Odu Ifa (sacred corpus). | Male |
| Ori | Deity of the beforelife, afterlife, destiny and personal identity. | Genderless |
| Ọsanyin (Aroni) | Deity of herbs, healing, plants, nature, herbalists and wizardry. | Male |
| Oṣosi (Osoosi) | Warrior deity of the hunt, forests and justice. Father of Logun Edé. | Male |
| Oṣun | Deity of rivers, water, beauty, purity, love, fertility, and sensuality. Extremely beautiful, kindhearted and a great cook. Second and the youngest wife of Shango. | Female |
| Oṣunmare | Deity of the rainbow, regeneration and rebirth. Described as a serpent spirit and created the rainbow. | Male or Female |
| Otin | River deity of protection. Said to be a hunter. Wife of Erinlẹ̀. | Female |
| Ọya | Warrior deity of storms, wind, thunder, lightning and the dead. She is also compassionate and loves children.Third wife of Ṣango. | Female |
| Shango (or Ṣàngó) | Deity of thunder, lightning, fire, justice, dance, virility and drumming. One of the most powerful and feared Oriṣa. Younger brother of Ajaka, father of the Ibeji, and husband of Ọba, Ọṣun and Ọya. | Male |
| Yemoja | Deity of rivers, fish, water, the moon, motherhood and protection. One of the most venerated Oriṣa. | Female |
| Yemowo (or Yemòó) | Water deity. Consort of Obatala. | Female |
| Yewa | River deity of the Yewa River. | Female |

== The Ajogun ==
| Name | Description |
|---|---|
| Iku | Spirit of death. Head of the Ajogun. |
| Arun | Spirit of disease and illness. |
| Ẹgba | Spirit of paralysis and infirmity. |
| Epe | Spirit of curses. |
| Eṣe | Spirit of wounds and affliction. |
| Ẹwọn | Spirit of imprisonment/captivity. |
| Ofo | Spirit of loss and destruction of property. |
| Oran | Spirit of conflict and trouble. |

== Supreme Deity ==
The Supreme Being in Yorùbá culture is known as Ọlọrun, Olódùmarè or Elédùa amongst other names.

== Metaphysical personifications or spirits ==
- Ori - personification of one's spiritual intuition and destiny.

== See also ==
- List of deities
- Irunmọlẹ
- Lwa
- Alusi
