= Elegua =

Deity of roads in some Yoruba derived religions

Elegua Èṣù-Ẹlẹ́gbára
- Crossroads, Paths and homes, Doorways, Ways, Life and Death
- Member of Orisha
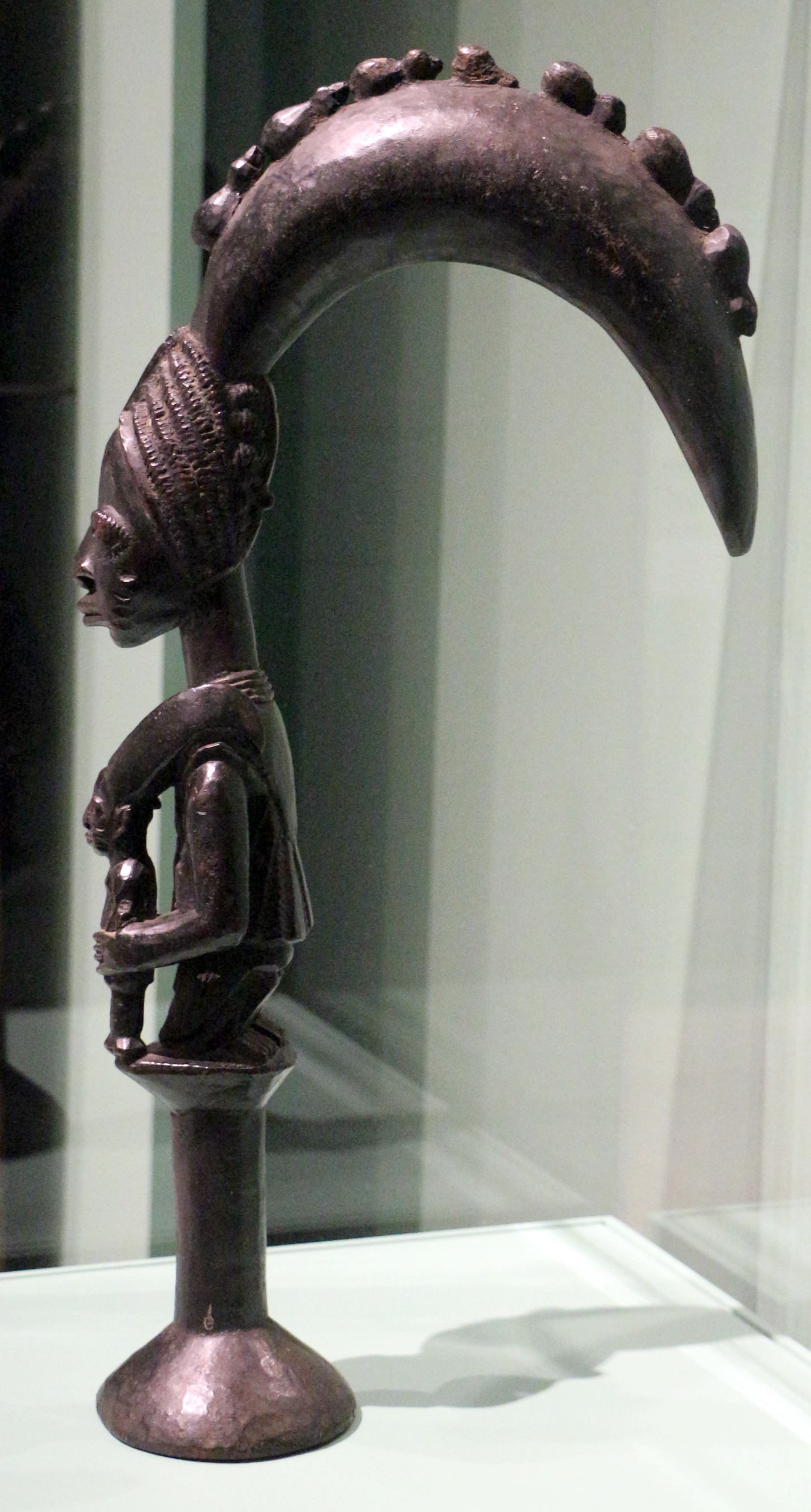
- Other names: Eleggua, Elegba
- Venerated in: Yoruba religion, Ifa-Orisha, Santería, Candomblé
- Region: Yorubaland, North America, Latin America
- Ethnic group: Yoruba people, African Diaspora

Elegua (Yoruba: Èṣù-Ẹlẹ́gbára and Ẹlẹ́gbáa, Eshu / Elegba in North America, in Cuba spelled Elegguá; also known as Eleguá in Latin America Spanish-speaking Caribbean islands, and Exu in Brazil) is an Orisha, a deity of roads in the Yoruba religion, Santería, Winti, Umbanda, Quimbanda, and Candomblé.

== In Africa ==
Elegua is known as Ẹlẹ́gbára (Ẹlẹ́gbáa is the reduced spelling) in the Yoruba religion and is another name for Eshu. Ẹlẹ́gbára means the "master of force" in the Yoruba language.

In towns of the Yoruba region, such as Ila-Orangun, small mounds of Ẹlẹ́gbáa are present. These stones, known as Èṣù-ọ̀nà, often takes the form of a small piece of red laterite stone or terracotta emerging from the walls of the city, with eyes made of cowry shells, and offerings to Ẹlẹ́gbáa are often left at these stones. Larger pillars of the red stone can also be found at crossroads, marketplaces, and royal palaces, either outside or inside but in places visible to the public, in order to gain favour and guidance from the Òrìṣà.

At these pillars, Ẹlẹ́gbáa receives a yearly offering of prayers and animal sacrifices on New Years (Igbefa), in order to pray to him for protection from evil, longevity, bountiful harvests, prosperity in hunting, and other acts of ritual importance. While Ogun is the principal Orisha, it is Ẹlẹ́gbáa who is always the first to receive these offerings and prayers.

Ẹlẹ́gbáa's image can also commonly be found on tools of babaláwos, such as on divinary trays upon which kola nuts are cast. In general, he acts as the mediator between the physical world and spiritual world. Due to his close connections to both the supernatural and physical worlds, he is also capable of providing protection from magically-derived harm.

Ẹlẹ́gbáa is also revered as the òrìṣà with the power to unite opposites as well as to cause things to become the opposite, such as causing friends to become enemies. In Yoruba cosmology, the universe is envisioned as existing in dualistic opposites and that it arose from the union of these opposites. Despite this, this contrast can cause inherent conflict, and it is the duty of Ẹlẹ́gbáa to ensure they stay in balance. He is referred to as Asotun-sosi ldi n'itij'u ('The one who befriends the Right and the Left without feeling ashamed') when he acts as the keeper of balance. Other titles he is known by also invoke this role, such as Ogege A-gbaiye-gun ('The-stabilizer-of-the-World') and Orun-li-o-mo-ilaja ('The-one-sent-from-heaven-to-settle-conflicts').

== In the United States ==
In the United States, Elegbara (also spelled Elegba) is an Orisa (deity) originating from the Yoruba religion of West Africa, widely known as the master of the crossroads, a divine messenger, and a powerful, complex trickster figure. The term translates to "the one who has strength or power". Elegbara is the vital link between humans and the Orishas (deities) and the Supreme Being, Olodumare. All rituals and prayers must acknowledge and receive his permission first to ensure communication is received. He is the "owner of the roads" and doors in life, symbolizing destiny, opportunity, and the choices one makes. He can open or close the path to fortune and is associated with places where one's life can change rapidly, such as markets and physical crossroads. Often depicted as a mischievous and dual-natured deity, he embodies the duality of life, bringing both challenges and opportunities. He acts as a "divine policeman", enforcing social and religious law and bringing consequences to those who live contrary to it. In North American and Caribbean traditions, where African practices were often merged along with Christianity due to the Trans-Atlantic Slave Trade, Elegbara is syncretized with Catholic saints to preserve ancestral worship. He is commonly identified with the Holy Child of Atocha, Saint Anthony of Padua, or the Archangel Michael.

== Santería ==
Eleguá (also known as Legba) is recognized in the Dominican Republic, Haiti, Colombia, Cuba, Puerto Rico, and Mexico as the orisha and "owner" of caminos—roads and paths. Eleguá is often depicted as a trickster figure, embodying both youth and mischief as well as age and wisdom, symbolizing the various paths and phases of fate and life. His colors are red, black, and white, and his associated numbers are 3 and 21. In Santería, all ceremonies and rituals must first receive Eleguá's approval before proceeding, as he serves as the messenger of Olofi. Within the Cuban tradition of Regla de Ocha, Eleguá differs slightly from Echu, who is considered his brother but characterized as more dangerous and aggressive. Eleguá is known for moving silently, whereas Echu is described as forcefully "breaking through". Manifestations of Eleguá include Akefun, Aleshujade, Arabobo, Awanjonu, Lalafán, Obasín, Oparicocha, and Osokere.

There is a patakí (story) in Santería in which Olodumare gives Eleguá the keys to the past, present, and future; for this reason, Eleguá is often depicted holding a set of keys. A figure of Eleguá may be placed in the house behind the entrance door. These figures are usually made with cement and cowrie shells, and sometimes sit within clay dishes.

== In West African Vodun and its New World derivatives ==
In West African Vodun and its diasporic derivatives (Dominican Republic Vudú, Haitian Vodou, Louisiana Voodoo, and Winti), Elegua corresponds to Legba or Papa Legba, a lwa, or loa, who serves as the intermediary between God and humanity.

== In Brazil ==
In the Afro-Brazilian religion Elegbara is Exu.

== See also ==
- Crossroads (folklore)
