= Irunmọlẹ =

Order of primordial deities in the Yoruba religion

The Irunmọlẹ (Yoruba: Irúnmọlẹ̀) are a group of primordial divine beings, or orishas, in the Yoruba religion, a West African religion practised by the Yoruba people. Ọbatala is the oldest Irunmọlẹ, and is regarded as the king of all Orishas.

== Description ==
The Irunmọlẹ are a group of primordial divine beings created by the Supreme Being, Olodumare and sent down to Earth to complete specific tasks. They differ from the other Orisha in that they existed from the beginning of the world, unlike humans that only became deified after death. This denotes that all Irunmọlẹ are Orisha but not all Orisha are Irunmọlẹ.

Although the term refers to a specific, higher class of divinities, it is sometimes used to refer to deified human ancestors who became highly revered as embodiments of primordial forces or to the Orisha in general.

The Irunmọlẹ are believed to be 801 in number, though this may vary. According to the Odu Ifa, 200 Irunmọlẹ reside permanently at the right side of Olodumare, 200 at their left, and 401 descended from Ọrun. Some major Irunmọlẹ include Ọbatala (the first), Oduduwa, Ọrunmila, Eshu, Ogun, Olokun, Ọbaluaye, Shango, (Note: The Irunmọlẹ Shango (also called Jakuta) is often held to have been incarnated as the historical Alaafin Shango of the Oyo Empire, who then became deified as an Oriṣa after his death, though other traditions hold that they are two distinct figures who became conflated. See also: Ọramfẹ) and Yemọja.

== Ọbatala ==
Ọbatala is the oldest Irunmọlẹ, as he was the first one created by Olodumare. He is credited with the creation of the Earth and humanity. He is a powerful divinity of creation, the sky and purity. He is regarded as the king of all orisha.

== Etymology ==
The etymology of the term is derived from a Yoruba blend of irún + imọlẹ̀, meaning "four hundred deities", ultimately from irún ("four hundred") + i- (“nominalizing prefix”) + mọ ("to mold, to shape") + ilẹ̀ ("land"), literally "The four hundred creators of the land".

== See also ==
- Orisha
- Ajogun
- Olodumare
- List of Yoruba deities
