= Odù Ifá =

Central religious corpus of Yoruba religion

Odu Ifa
- Odù Ifá
- A pictorial sphere illustrating the Oju Odu, the 16 major Odus of the Odu Ifa, written in Yoruba script.

Information
- Religion: Iṣẹṣe
- Language: Yoruba
- Period: Unknown, probably around 6000 BCE
- Chapters: 256 Odus
- Verses: 204,800 (approx., at least)

The Odu Ifá (Yoruba alphabet: Odù Ifá), also called the Ifa Literary Corpus is a large collection of allegorical and literal historical proverbs (Òwe), poetic verses (Ẹsẹ̀) and stories (Àlọ́/Pàtàkì) that serves as the central religious scripture of Iṣẹṣe. The Odu Ifa is an oral corpus (a collection of texts) passed down originally in Yoruba language through generations, believed by the Yoruba to have been revealed by the deity of wisdom, Ọrunmila, to humanity.

The Odu Ifá is made up of 256 chapters called Odus, each consisting of around 800 verses called Ẹsẹ̀. The exact number of ẹsẹ is continuously increasing. Each Odu is represented with a unique binary signature. The 16 major odus are called Oju Odu, and the others Ọmọ Odu. It is closely associated with Ifá and it is used during divination. While the Odù Ifá is still majorly recited in its oral form, many written versions have also been published.

== Etymology ==
"Odu" is derived from the Yoruba word Odù which means a very large repository or container containing or holding other items within. It could also contextually mean "source of creation" or "womb". The word "Ifá" refers to the complex Yoruba divination system.

== The Odus ==
Graph showing the 256 Odus by Dr. Will Coleman, Oscar Daniel and Brad Ost

In the Ifá corpus, there are 256 Odus in total. Of these, 16 are regarded as the principal or most important by babalawos. They are known as the Oju Odu:

1. Eji-Ogbe - The Supporter
2. Oyeku - The Mother of Death (Iku)
3. Iwori - The Deep Seer
4. Odi - The Seal (Aṣẹ)
5. Irosun - The Resounding Oṣun
6. Owonrin - The Reversed Head
7. Obara - The Resting and Hovering One
8. Okanran - The Beater of Sticks and Mats
9. Ogunda - The Creator
10. Osa - The Spirit of Sa (Ọya)
11. Ika - The Controller
12. Oturupọn - The Bearer
13. Otura - The Comforter
14. Irete - The Crusher
15. Ose - The Conqueror
16. Ofun - The Giver

== Eji-Ogbe ==
Ori ni Ejiogbe (Verse of Ori):

A loud sound is heard when an object falls to the ground.
We divined for the blacksmith of the ocean we call Ori;
Ori was who created Ọya in the land of Ira;
Ori was who created Ṣango in Koso;
Ori was who created Ọbatala in the land of Iranje;
Ori was who created Ogun in the land of Ire;
Ori was who created Eṣu in the town of Ketu;
Ori was who created Ọṣun in Ijumu;
Ori was who created Ọrunmila in Oke Igeti
To all devotees of Ifá I say, where Ori has placed me in is good.

— Eji-Ogbe

Eji-Ogbe (also called Ogbe, Ejiogbe or Baba Ejiogbe) is the first, most important and most extensive Odu. It is known as "the Supporter" and is described as the manifestation of pure light and the King of the Odu. Children who are given the signature of Ejiogbe at birth are seen as comparable to kings and are advised not to bow before them. The major theme of the verses in this Odu is emphasis on the benefits of following instructions given during Ifá divination and the repercussions of choosing to disobey. It also consists of tales about the Oriṣa (especially Ọrunmila) and the Ajogun.

== See also ==
- Ifá
- Ọrunmila
- Ọlọrun
- List of Yoruba deities
