= Ayagunna =

Youngest path in Lukumi religious pantheon

Ajagunda is the youngest path, or avatar, of the Sky Father Obatala in the Lukumi (Santería) pantheon. In this manifestation, Obatala is a youth who battles with a scimitar. He is credited with having spread gunpowder throughout the world. In addition, he traveled to Asia, where he warred against and defeated his enemies, taking their heads with him as evidence of his destruction. The normally peaceful and calm Obatala manifests a fierceness and thirst for peace by way of domination in this aspect.

== Role and characteristics ==
In the Lukumi system, Ajagunda can turn out to be one's governing orisha. His receptacle contains the requisite items of Obatala as well as additional ones that are designated only to that path. When one receives Ochanla, one must already be in possession of Ajagunda or receive him along with her. Although Obatala eats female animals due to his duality and age, after receiving Ochanla, the adherent must feed Ajagunda male animals and Ochanla female. Ajagunda is often envisioned in a similar fashion to Shango. He is a member of the fun-fun (white) court of Obatala as a divine king, as are all of his other manifestations. When his adherents manifest his energies during religious trance sessions, Ajagunda behaves with swift, strong, and battle-like movements. Hence, he is the paladin among orishas. His children are often mistaken for children of Shango.

Ajagunda wears all white with the exception of a diagonal red sash that bisects his tunic. The patakis or stories of the faith state that Olofin put Ajagunda in charge of bringing order to the earth since man had been left to his own devices. At first, Ajagunda asked the people to bring their lives in line with the laws of Olofi, but they ignored his requests. After a while, Ajagunda grew less and less patient and finally stopped making requests and took more punitive measures by executing those who refused to obey. Word got back to Olofi, and he traveled to our world from Ara Onu to see for himself what Ajagunda had wrought. When Ajagunda saw Olofi coming, he wiped his scimitar across his chest to clean the blood from its blade. Olofi scolded Ajagunda for causing such confusion, but Ajagunda then responded in a lawyerly fashion: "Father, without conflict, there can be no progress". Olofi considered his words and agreed.

Ajagunda is also known for being the breeder of conflict and war. His name literally means "war dog".

Ajagunda said the day he lays down his sword, the world will cease to exist.

Ayagunna is a Spanish mispronunciation of the proper Yoruba Ajaguna. In Spanish, the j sounds like a y.

== Art ==
Art related to Ajagunda is held at Duke University's The Sacred Art of the Black Atlantic collection.
