= Macumba =

Generic term for various Afro-Brazilian religions

Macumba (Portuguese pronunciation: [maˈkũᵐbɐ]) is a generic term for various Afro-Brazilian religions, the practitioners of which are then called macumbeiros. These terms are generally regarded as having negative connotations, comparable to an English term like "black magic". In a broader sense, the term Macumba is used for most Afro-Brazilian religious traditions, including Candomblé and Umbanda. In a more limited sense, macumba is used only to characterize traditions such as Quimbanda that revolve around the lesser exu spirits, especially as they are practiced in Rio de Janeiro. Some practitioners of Afro-Brazilian traditions call themselves macumbeiros, although in some instances this is done predominantly in jest.

== Etymology ==
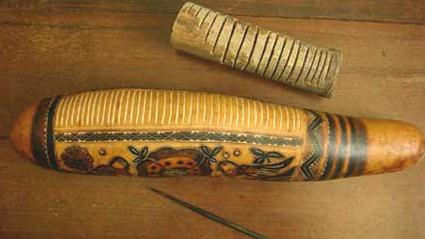
The macumba, a type of percussion instrument from Africa; this may have been the origin of the Brazilian term macumba

There are debates regarding the etymological origins of the term Macumba and the matter remains unsettled. Some scholars have argued that Macumba derives from a Bantu language term for a type of percussion instrument. If so, the use of such instruments in the rituals of Bantu speakers brought to Brazil might have resulted in the word becoming associated with Afro-Brazilian religious traditions. An alternative argument, put forward by Marcos Aurélio Luz and Georges Lapassade, argued that macumba derived from the term mocamba, which designated a house of runaway slaves.

== Definitions ==
There are conflicting views as to what the term Macumba describes. The term is sometimes used as a colloquial term for all Afro-Brazilian religions. The scholar Stefania Capone noted that, when applied to Afro-Brazilian religions, Macumba can "indicate anything to do with spirits". In this, macumba is used in much the same way as the term calundu, which had been used in the 18th century to describe Afro-Brazilian traditions.

In this sense, the term macumbeiros has sometimes been used for practitioners of Candomblé and Umbanda, two Afro-Brazilian religions that emerged in the 19th and early 20th centuries respectively. Writing in the 1990s, the anthropologist Robert A. Voeks noted that those who took an extremely negative view of Candomblé still viewed it as being "impregnated with devil worship and macumba." The term macumba has also been historically used for Umbanda, and some Umbandists have referred to themselves as macumbeiros, often in jest due to the negative connotations of this term. At the same time, there are those taking a positive view of Candomblé and Umbanda who seek to distinguish these traditions from what they call macumba.

=== Stricter sense ===
Other definitions suggest a more restrictive use of the term. The scholar Kelly Hayes noted that while Macumba was "a term used to denominate Afro-Brazilian religious cults, practices, and ritual objects" as a whole, it was used "most especially" for "those thought to involve feitiçaria, sorcery or black magic." The scholar Steven Engler noted that Macumba "refers not to a specific religion but to a range of popular Afro-Brazilian rituals (often labeled 'black magic') that aim at healing and worldly benefits."

In particular the term has been used for those practitioners who cultivate relations with spirits referred to as exus; in Brazil, these are sometimes also called "devils," while devotees call them povo da rua, people of the streets." In this sense, macumba is most associated with the area around Rio de Janeiro. Much of the specialist literature on the topic has identified that city as the home of Macumba, with some practitioners of Afro-Brazilian traditions in Rio referring to their practices as Macumba.

Hayes argued that the term effectively operated as a "boundary marker within larger classificatory projects", one commonly used "to determine legitimate forms of religious expression, establishing the boundaries of religious authenticity, propriety, and morality." They noted that much literature sought to portray Candomblé as a legitimate religion of pure African derivation while simultaneously denigrating Macumba as "especially syncretistic, impure, or degraded". This division is evident in the work of the sociologist Roger Bastide, who presented the Nago tradition of Candomblé, of which he was an initiate, as a legitimate religion, while dismissing the Bantu tradition of Candomblé as a form of Macumba that could only be labelled magic.
