= Pomba Gira =

Figure in Brazilian mythology

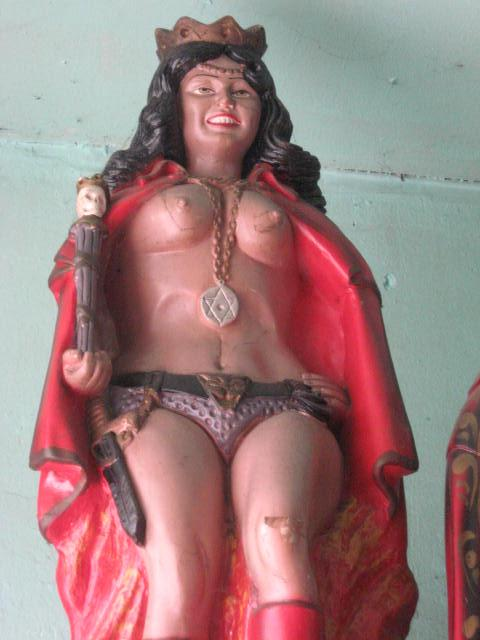
- A representation of Pomba Gira
- Venerated in: Umbanda, Quimbanda
- Patronage: Love, Freedom, Empowerment, Feminine energy, desire, fire.

Pomba Gira (from Kimbundu: pambuanjila, lit. 'crossroads') is the name of an Afro-Brazilian spirit evoked by practitioners of Umbanda and Quimbanda in Brazil. She is the consort of Exu, who is the messenger of the Orixas in Candomblé. Known by many names, or avatars, Pomba Gira is often associated with the number seven, crossroads, graveyards, spirit possession, and witchcraft.

== Tradition ==
While Exu represents male sexuality, fertility and strength, Pomba Gira personifies female sexuality, beauty and desire. She is depicted as a beautiful woman who is insatiable. Pomba Gira is venerated with great respect and care because of her reputation for possessing great wrath. She is often invoked by those who seek aid in matters of the heart and love.

Pomba Gira is noted for her connection with both transgender women and effeminate male worshippers and is reputed to possess both. Some representations of Pomba Gira display the characteristics of being promiscuous, talkative and vulgar. However she has many avatars, and will be more or less inclined towards that behavior depending on how she manifests herself.

== Avatars ==
Pomba Gira can manifest with many names, known as "falanges" (phalanges). Some most known Pomba Gira's names are:

- Dama da Noite (Lady of the Night)
- Maria Mulambo da Lixeira (Filthy Mary of the Trash Can)
- Maria Mulambo das Sete Catacumbas (Filthy Mary of the Seven Tombs)
- Maria Mulambo das Cavaleiras de Vassoura da Meia-Noixe (Filthy Mary of the Midnight Broom-Riders)
- Maria Padilha (María de Padilla)
- Maria Quitéria (Warrior Mary), unrelated to Maria Quitéria
- Pombajira Cigana (Gypsy Pombajira)
- Pombajira do Ouro (Pombagira of the Gold)
- Pombajira das Almas (Pombajira of Souls)
- Pombajira das Cobras (Pombajira of Snakes)
- Pombajira das Sete Encruzilhadas (Pombajira of the Seven Crossroads)
- Pombajira dos Sete Cruzeiros da Calunga (Pombajira of the Seven Crosses of Kalunga)
- Pombajira da Praia (Pombajira of the Beach)
- Pombajira Mirongueira (Enchantress Pombajira)
- Pombajira Mocinha ou Menina (Young Girl Pombajira)
- Pombajira Rainha (Queen Pombajira)
- Pombajira Sete Calungas (Pombajira Seven Kalungas)
- Rainha do Cemitério (Queen of the Graveyard)
- Rainha Sete Encruzilhadas (Queen of the Seven Crossroads)
- Rosa Caveira (Skull Rose)
- Pombajira Rainha do Inferno (Pombajira Queen of Hell)
- Pombajira Rosa Caveira (Pombajira Skull Rose)
- Pombajira do Cabaré (Night Club Pombagira)
- Pombajira Sete Saias (Pombajira Seven Skirts)
- Pombajira Tatá Mulambo (Pombajira Older Filthy)
- Pombajira das Rosas (Pombajira of the roses)
- Pombajira das Sete Rosas (Pombajira of the Seven Roses)
- Pombagira Rosa Vermelha (Pombagira Red Rose)

== Bibliography ==
- Blanchette, Thadeus; da Silva, Ana Paula; De Lisio, Amanda (2018). ""Pomba Gira Keeps an Eye on Us": The Presence of the Orixás in Rio de Janeiro Brothels". Studia Religiologica. 51 (4). Kraków: Wydawnictwo Uniwersytetu Jagiellońskiego: 247–263. doi:10.4467/20844077SR.18.018.10102. S2CID 186778354.
- de Carvalho, José Jorge (2004). "Violence and chaos in Afro-Brazilian religious experience/La violence et le chaos dans les religions afro-brésiliennes". Systèmes de pensée en Afrique noire. 16. Paris: École pratique des hautes études: 111–148. doi:10.4000/span.1186. ISSN 2268-1558. S2CID 18182440.
- Hayes, Kelly E. (May 2011). "Wicked Women and Femmes Fatales" (PDF). Holy Harlots: Femininity, Sexuality, and Black Magic in Brazil. Berkeley: University of California Press. pp. 3–37. doi:10.1525/california/9780520262645.001.0001. ISBN 9780520262645. S2CID 190938693.
- Hayes, Kelly E. (August 2008). Copp, Paul; Wedemeyer, Christian K. (eds.). "Wicked Women and Femmes Fatales: Gender, Power, and Pomba Gira in Brazil". History of Religions. 48 (1). Chicago: University of Chicago Press: 1–21. doi:10.1086/592152. ISSN 0018-2710. JSTOR 00182710. LCCN 64001081. OCLC 299661763. S2CID 162196759.
- Oleszkiewicz-Peralba, Małgorzata (2015). "Pombagira, the Holy Streetwalker". Fierce Feminine Divinities of Eurasia and Latin America: Baba Yaga, Kālī, Pombagira, and Santa Muerte. New York: Palgrave Macmillan. pp. 69–101. doi:10.1057/9781137535009_4. ISBN 978-1-137-54354-7. S2CID 156238189.
