= Diffused monotheism =

Belief in the existence of one God who delegates authority to lesser divinities

Diffused monotheism (from Greek μόνος "one" and θεός "god," with Middle French diffuser, from Latin diffūsus, past participle of diffundere, from dis- + fundere) is a term primarily used by some scholars in the philosophy of religion and theology to refer to the belief in one Supreme Being who consigns authority to myriad lesser divinities or deities. It has been argued that this creates a belief system where one God is generally acknowledged but worship is centred on the other divinities, making it seem like polytheism while still established in monotheism. Closely related to the concept of henotheism, it was originated by E. Bolaji Idowu in 1962.

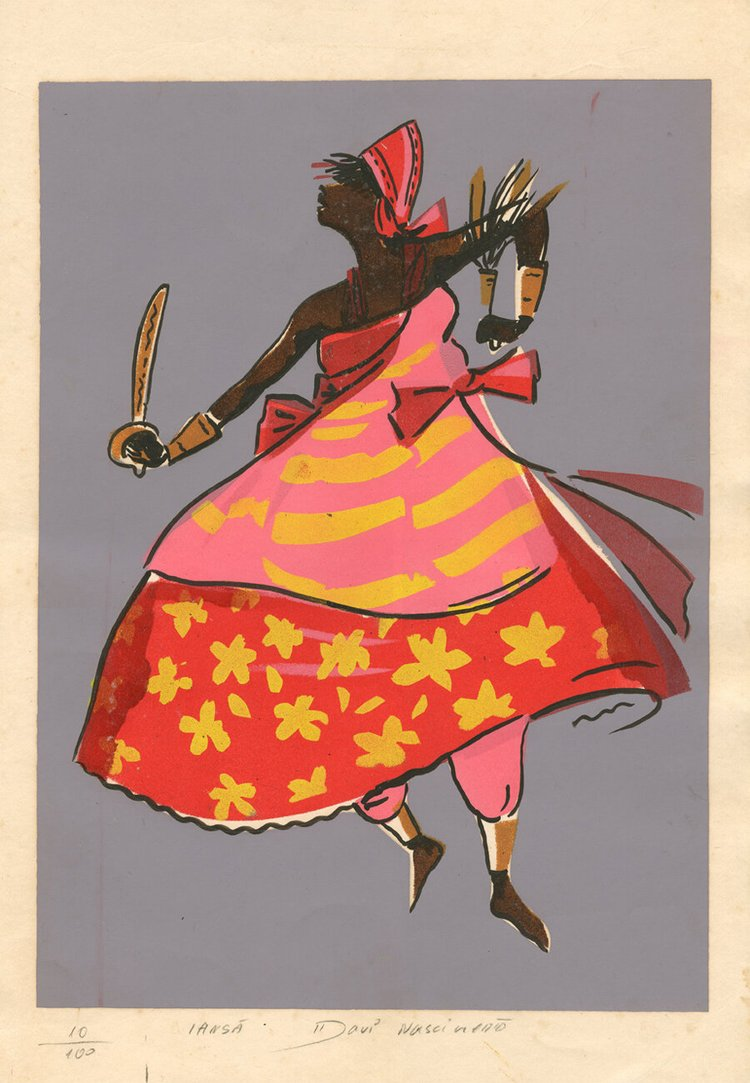
Illustration of Oya, a divinity in Iṣẹṣe, an ethnic religion described as diffused monotheism, by Carybé.

== See also ==
- Polytheism
- Pantheism
- Monolatry
- African traditional religions
- Monotheism
- Henotheism
