= Agẹmọ =

Messenger of Ọlọrun in Yoruba religion

- Messenger of Ọlọrun
- Member of Orisha
- Venerated in: Yoruba religion
- Major cult center: Ijẹbu
- Abode: Ọrun
- Animals: Chameleon
- Color: Multicolor
- Region: Yorubaland
- Ethnic group: Yoruba people
- Festivals: Agemo festival

In the Yoruba religion, Agẹmọ is a chameleon spirit that is the servant of Ọlọrun, the Supreme Being who created the Yoruba pantheon of deities known as Orishas. Agemo carries messages between Ọlọrun and the orishas.

== Mythology ==
In one myth, Agemo helped his master Ọlọrun win in a competition against Olokun, the goddess of the sea. Olokun was skilled at weaving and dyeing cloth, which made her think that she was superior to all of the other Orishas, including Ọlọrun. She challenged Ọlọrun to a cloth-making contest to determine who was truly superior. Ọlọrun told Agemo to ask Olokun to show them her best cloth, and if they were impressed, they would accept the challenge. Agemo, being a chameleon, was able to replicate the patterns of every piece of cloth that Olokun produced. Olokun thought that if Ọlọrun's messenger could so easily replicate her work, she would be no match for Ọlọrun themselves, and admitted defeat.

== Worship ==
Agemo is the main deity of the Ijebu people. Agemo's cult spread primarily through the conversion of infertile women, many of whom went to the deity to cure their infertility. When they were cured, they dedicated themselves and their children to worshipping Agemo.

In the past, human sacrifice was offered to Agemo, with the human victim being allowed to rot in the grove shrine of the deity. Later on, a change was made where a human and a cow were sacrificed on alternate years. The year on which a human was sacrificed was called Ako Odun, and the year on which the cow was sacrificed was known as Abo Odun. When human sacrifice was abolished, Ako Odun became a year for sacrificing a bull, and Abo Odun became a year for sacrificing a female cow. Unlike the human sacrifices, which were left to rot, the sacrifices of bulls and cows are eaten by the people.

The Agemo festival is a masked festival traditionally held in many Yoruba cities but more popularly linked with the Ijebu people of Ogun State. The festival and accompanying rituals are celebrated to honor Agemo, who is believed to be a protector of children and who safeguards the future of Ijebu people through his blessing.
