= Quimbanda =

Afro-Brazilian religion

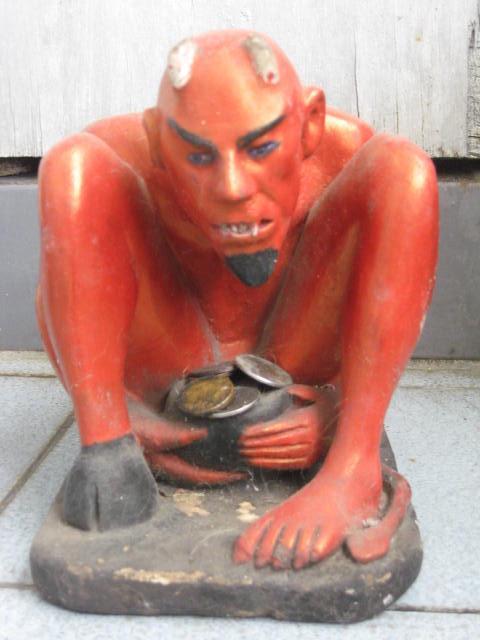
Statue of an exú, one of the spirits that are central to Quimbanda

Quimbanda, also spelled Kimbanda (Portuguese pronunciation: [kĩˈbɐ̃dɐ]), is an Afro-Brazilian religion practiced primarily in the urban city centers of Brazil.

Quimbanda focuses on male spirits called exús as well as their female counterparts, pomba giras. Pomba giras are often regarded as the spirits of deceased women who worked as prostitutes or in other positions traditionally considered immoral in Catholic Brazilian society. Quimbanda's practices are often focused on worldly success regarding money and sex.

A range of Afro-Brazilian religions emerged in Brazil, often labelled together under the term Macumba, which often carried negative connotations. Historically, the term Quimbanda has been used by practitioners of Umbanda, a religion established in Brazil during the 1920s, to characterise the religious practices that they opposed. Quimbanda thus served as a mirror image for Umbandistas. By the early 21st century, Quimbanda had also spread to North America.

== Definitions ==
Marc Meistrich Gidal, an ethnomusicologist specializing in Afro-Brazilian religious practice, describes Quimbanda and Umbanda as syncretic religions taking influences from Kardecist Spiritism, folk Catholicism, and Afro-Brazilian religions such as Batuque and Candomblé.In Brazil, there are individuals who call themselves Quimbandeiros and openly practice Quimbanda.

Quimbanda has similarities to the Afro-Brazilian traditions of Candomblé. According to Gidal, Quimbanda and Umbanda are “heterodox”, favoring innovation and adaptation, and have more European influence, whereas Candomblé and Batuque are “orthodox”, favoring conservation of African-derived traditions, but noted that many adherent practice both. The scholar of religion Fredrik Gregorius noted that Quimbanda differed from Candomblé and Umbanda by having "a sinister façade".

=== Relationship with Umbanda ===
Umbanda is a religion that emerged in the area around Rio de Janeiro during the 1920s. It similarly combined elements of Spiritism (Espiritismo) with ideas from Afro-Brazilian religions like Candomblé, as well as influences from Roman Catholicism. The scholar of religion Steven Engler described Quimbanda as being "closely related" to Umbanda, while anthropologist David J. Hess called the two religions "siblings". The ethnomusicologist Marc Gidal observed that many Quimbandists insist their religion is distinct from Umbanda despite the "intimate connection" between the two traditions. He suggested that Quimbanda began as "a pejorative term for rejected elements of Umbanda". Various spirits and rituals cross over between the two religious systems.

Umbandist leaders have been keen to disavow practices they consider barbaric or primitive and maintain that said practices instead belong to Quimbanda. The anthropologists Diana Brown and Mario Bick noted that, for the early Umbandistas, "Quimbanda represented a repository for all the opprobrious associations from which they wished to escape." Given that Umbanda places focus on combating the harmful influences of exús, a common saying among Umbandistas is that "if it weren't for Quimbanda, Umbanda would have no reason to exist". Brown noted that Quimbanda represented "a crucial negative mirror image against which to define Umbanda," suggesting that it could also serve as an "ideological vehicle for expressing prejudices" towards African-derived and lower class religions.

The boundaries between Umbanda and Quimbanda are nevertheless not always clear, with various spirit mediums engaging or promoting practices associated with both. Hess noted that the two represented "ideal types," but that "in practice they comprise a total system in which one side only makes sense when placed in dialogue with the other side."

== Beliefs ==
Quimbanda is a spirit-mediumship religion. Its rituals focus on spirit mediums "incorporating", or being possessed by, various ancestral spirits. In distinction from Umbanda, it focuses on interactions with "spirits of the street", namely exus and pombagiras but also, since the 1970s, ciganos.

=== Exus ===
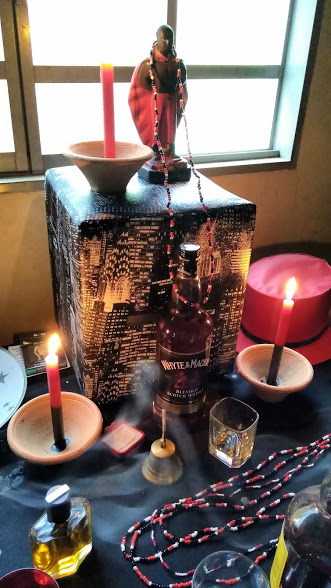
An altar to an exu

In Quimbanda the male spirits are known as Exus, they are considered very powerful spirits. Note that they are not the same as the Eshu/ Elegua of Lukumi Elegua/ Santeria; as Quimbanda has evolved as a religion, it has created a category of spirits collectively called Exus, whose name was borrowed from the deity Exu. Exus refers to the phalanx of spirits. Religious professor Kelly E. Hayes outlines the purposes of Exu spirits:

[Quimbanda] is associated particularly with the cultivation of a set of powerful spirit entities called Exus, referred to by their devotees as guardians.

Exus, commonly referred to as ‘spirits of the left’, are not purely evil. Instead, they are more human-like in their qualities and share in human weaknesses. Exu spirits primarily deal with human and material matters as opposed to the ‘spirits of the right’ used in Umbanda, who deal with primarily spiritual matters. Exus are typically called for rituals to arrange rendezvous, force justice, or keep life balance. From inside of the cult, Quimbanderos instead affirm that Exus cover both Spirit and Matter, and that They simply consider pointless to stick only to one of them. According to the lore provided by trained sorcerers, Exus has a stern and high morality, They simply accept to help people into delicate matters too, like seduction and vengeance, but never with the uninterest in morality and ethic often attributed to them by outsiders.

=== Pomba Giras ===
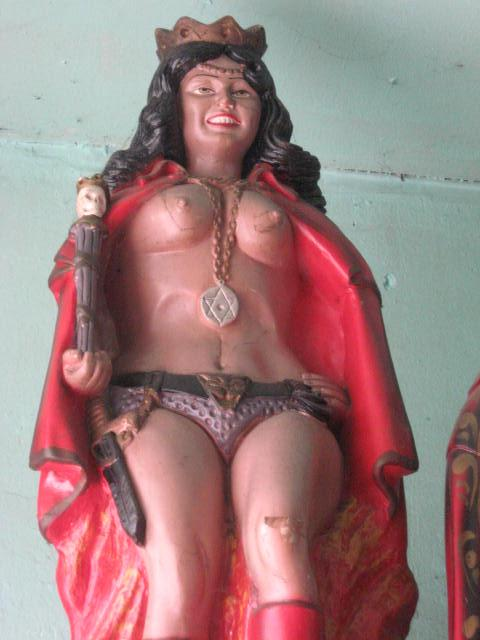
A statue of a pomba gira

The female counterparts of the exús, pombagiras are regarded as the spirits of immoral women such as prostitutes. Linked to marginal and dangerous places, they are associated with sexuality, blood, death, and cemeteries. They are often presented as being ribald and flirty, speaking in sexual euphemisms and double entendres. They wear red and black clothing, and only possess women and gay men, who will then often smoke or drink alcohol, using obscene language and behaving lasciviously. The term pombagira may derive from the Bantu word bombogira, the name of a male orixá in Candomblé's Bantu or Angola tradition. In Brazilian Portuguese, the term pomba is a euphemism for the vulva.

=== Ogum ===
Ogum is the orisha of warfare and metal. Ogum is also known as the Lord at the center of the crossroads. Rituals involving Ogum are typically less aggressive and more justice-bound than that of Exu. Professor David J. Hess speculates that Ogum acts as an intermediate figure between the rituals of Exu in Quimbanda and the rituals of Umbanda, revealing the deep connection between Quimbanda and Umbanda.

== Practices ==
Those seeking involvement in Quimbanda will often undergo an initial massanga or baptism, a ceremony taking place over several days. Full initiation may later take place, involving the spirits being "seated" within the individual through full spirit possession. Initiation into Quimbanda is expensive. Once performed, the initiate becomes a priest (tata) or priestess (yaya).

=== Rituals ===
A Quimbanda ritual, called a trabalho, typically consists of several parts: a motive, dedication to a spirit, a marginal location, the metal or clay (earthy) material, an alcoholic drink, scent, and food (usually a peppered flour-palm oil mixture, sometimes called miamiami). Animal sacrifice, generally avoided in Umbanda, is common in Quimbanda as it is in many Afro-Brazilian religions. Species sacrificed include pigeons, chickens, goats, sheep, and bulls. Songs that Quimbandistas sing for the deities are commonly called pontos.

Particular elements of an Exu trabalho remain unchanged in the Pomba Gira trabalho and therefore mark Pomba Giras as the female counterparts of Exu: the colors, the location (male to female variation), the time of day, the day of the week, the scent (smoky), and the container for the food and the flour/palm oil mixture. In a Pomba Gira trabalho, another set of elements indicates a gentler coding: from rum to champagne or anisette, from the absence of flowers to red roses, from pepper in the flour/palm oil mixture to honey, and from a fierce initiatory act to a song, which seems to suit the purpose of the ritual: to obtain a woman.

=== Marginal locations ===
‘Marginal locations’ refer to areas containing magical and spiritual significance where rituals are executed. Many Quimbanda rituals are performed at crossroads, as Exu is the Lord of the seven crossroads and Ogum is the Lord of the center of the crossroads. Other marginal locations include the streets at night (since Exus are referred to as ‘people of the streets’), cemeteries, beaches, and forests, all during the nighttime.

== History ==
=== From Africa to Brazil ===
Quimbanda originated in South America and developed in the Portuguese Empire. The Atlantic slave trade brought African cultural presence to the Americas. In Brazil, by the mid 19th century the slave population outnumbered the free population. The slave population increased when free men of African descent (libertos) were added to the slave population. The African culture brought by slaves to Brazil slowly mixed with the Indigenous American and European culture. In the large urban centers such as Rio de Janeiro, where the African-slave population was the most concentrated, the Colonial regime enforced a social control system to suppress the rising population. However, instead of suppressing the African slave population, the Colonial regime’s system had the opposite effect; the system divided the slave population into ‘nations’, which preserved, protected, and even institutionalized African religious and secular traditions. The large cities where the slave population was most concentrated preserved Macumba, the forerunner of Quimbanda, and still hold the largest following of Quimbanda.

=== Catholic influence ===
The Catholic Church has had very little lasting effect on Quimbanda unlike other Afro-Brazilian religions such as Umbanda. The Catholic Church in Brazil was under the direct control of the Portuguese crown so it relied on the state to provide funds, resulting in a very understaffed clergy in Brazil. Subsequently, the main Catholic influence in Brazil was a lay brotherhood. Therefore, the Catholic Church received only a nominal conversion of the African slaves. Ironically, the Catholic Church adopted the Colonial crown’s system of controlling the slave population, which in turn preserved African traditions.

=== From Macumba to Quimbanda and Umbanda ===
Before Quimbanda became its own separate religion, it was contained inside the religious tradition of Macumba. During the late 19th century and into the mid 20th century, Macumba was a pejorative term for all religions deemed by the Christian-dominant class as primitive, demonic and superstitious black magic. However, as African culture continued to blend with the native Brazilian culture, Macumba morphed into two religions: Umbanda and Quimbanda. Umbanda represented the ‘christianized’ aspects of Macumba, drawing heavily on spiritual and hierarchical values of French Spiritism and Catholicism. On the other hand, Quimbanda represented the aspects of Macumba that were rejected in the christianizing process, becoming ‘the Macumba of Macumbas’. The split between the black and white magic of Macumba has caused much debate over the unity or disunity of Quimbanda and Umbanda. Some believe that Quimbanda and Umbanda represent aspects or tendencies of a single system.

=== Contemporary ===
Quimbanda grew considerably in the 1970s. Although very little of the Brazilian population claims to follow Quimbanda, many people from all social ranks use Quimbanda rituals occasionally. It is a common practice for businessmen to consult Exus before major business dealings.

Quimbanda also spread to North America, often being adopted by people with an existing history with Western esoteric traditions like Thelema, Traditional Witchcraft, and New Age spirituality. Writing in 2025, Gregorius noted that the number of North Americans seeking initiation into the tradition was in the hundreds. Quimbanda has also been promoted to Westerners through publications, for instance by the Norwegian-Brazilian writer Nicolaj de Mattos Frisvold.

== Reception and influence ==
Quimbanda has been criticised and opposed by various groups in Brazilian society. Animal rights groups have objected to its practice of animal sacrifice. Spiritists maintain that Quimbandistas are drawing low spirits into the material realm, while some Pentecostals and other Christians have regarded Quimbanda as being in service of the Devil.
