= Oko (orisha) =

Orisha of agriculture in Yoruba religion

- Hunting, Agriculture, Farming, Fertility
- Member of Orisha
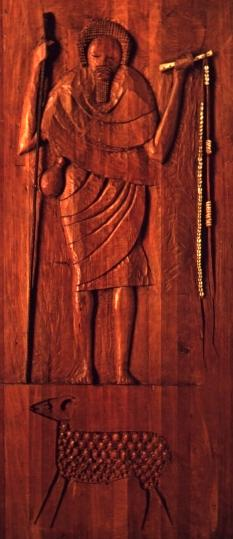
- Representation of Oko by Carybé, Museu Afro-Brasileiro, Salvador, Bahia, Brazil
- Other names: Oco, Òrìṣà Oko
- Venerated in: Yoruba religion, Dahomey mythology, Vodun, Santería, Candomblé
- Day: ọ̀sẹ̀ Ògún, ọ̀sẹ̀ Jàkúta, ọ̀sẹ̀ Ifá
- Color: Red and white; black and white beads; white beads with blue stripes
- Region: Nigeria, Benin, Latin America
- Ethnic group: Yoruba people, Fon people

Òrìṣà Oko, also known as Ocô in Brazil, is an Orisha worshipped in the Yoruba religion. According to tradition, before his death and deification, he was a strong hunter and farmer, as well as a fighter against sorcery. He is associated with the annual new harvest of the white African yam. Among the deities, he is considered a close friend of Ooṣa, Ogiyan and Shango, as well as a one-time husband of Ọya and Yemọja. Bees are said to be the messengers of Òrìṣà Oko.

In Brazilian Candomblé, he represents one of the Orishas of agriculture, together with Ogum. According to Prandi, Oko songs and myths are remembered, but their presence in celebrations is rare. In his representation, he had a wooden staff, played a flute of bones, and wore white. Oko is syncretized with Saint Isidore among Cuban orisha practitioners of Santería (Lucumí) and Regla de Ocha.
