= Patakí =

Brief teaching story used in Ifá and Santería

A patakí is an anecdote or brief teaching story used in Ifá and Santería.

== Definition ==
“Oral narratives of the Lucumí faith, religious stories [are] known to practitioners as patakís.” A patakí can be likened to a Christian parable. Santería initiates use the short fables to teach and illustrate a moral lesson to followers. The patakí is passed down orally through generations of Santería initiates. “Some patakís narrate the birth or death of an Orisha in human form. Others deal with relationships between Orishas.” These stories offer advice to followers on how to deal with life’s issues. The patakís also serve as creation stories on how the natural world came into being. The moral lessons of the patakí have a range of themes, such as respecting your elders, how to be humble and grateful for what you have, not underestimating your enemy, knowing who is your friend and who is not. Patakís are written in an artful narrative style. They are usually set in an ancient time when the Orishas were still in human form. Patakís are “part of this enormous mine of oral lucumí literature”.

== Oral tradition ==
“Most babalawos are experts on the patakís and memorize a large corpus of them, although it is impossible to say how many patakís exist in an oral tradition that spans centuries. Some Santeros/as are also familiar with the patakís, but it is not a requirement for Santeros/as to memorize the stories in order to practice the religion. Where the patakí fits into this system is unique, because they are taught in Ilés and depending on the Ilé the same patakí might have slight variation. Newly initiated Babaaláwos are taught patakís and other secrets of the religion by Padrinos and for their first years study quite intensely. Aside from libretas, which are private religious notebooks used for passing down rituals and traditions, there is a slight distrust for things written in a book.

== Understanding the patakí ==
Interpretation and use of patakí text by babaaláwos is based on a system of Odu. The original oral literature is kept intact but was applied to the marginality the Afro-Cuban faced in the New World. The esoteric nature in which the patakí is situated also allows for hidden meaning in the ‘writings’. Patakís may be written in libretas but many are memorized from oral transmission.

There are many discrepancies on pronunciations, and written forms of some of the Yoruba words in Lucumí literature. Many words are Spanish. Because there is no standard format, many versions of words and some variation on the practices exist. "The existence of the word as something usable in utterances presupposes a collective understanding of its existence." The entire religious community has acknowledged the practices, traditions and words of Santería and other divination elements such as the patakí and therefore it has become legitimate collective knowledge. The transculturation that created Santería and many other Afro-Cuban traditions has become a part of national identity. What is most important about the patakí is that the original idea, or moral of the story remain intact through translation and interpretation.
