= Aaja =

Orisha of whirlwinds and forests in the Yoruba religion

Àjìjà (often elided as Ààjà, "whirlwind" in Yoruba; also called Eziza in Edo and Ajá in Spanish) is the Orisha of the whirlwind, forest, the animals within it and herbalists. In her forests she would find plants with medicinal properties and mix the herbs and roots and other plant parts together to find cures for the sick. She holds the secrets of botany and can be also looked to for help with trading and economic prosperity. Ajá shared much of her knowledge with humans waiting for someone to come and find her to share it with. This person was usually a shaman in training, or someone of the like.

It's believed that if someone is carried away by Ajá and then returns, they become a powerful medicine man or woman (Oníṣègùn). Ajija uses the whirlwind to lift, convey or transport people from their abodes into the jungle or some other unknown place to impact unto them the ways of herbalism. According to legend, when someone wants to learn the secrets or mysteries of herbs, they wander in the forest until they get lost therein. Ajija then appears to the lost votary who must not show any fear, after which they are taken and taught the curative powers of herbs and plants. Once the lessons are over, they will be guided out of the forest by Ajija. The journey supposedly will have a duration of between 7 days to 3 months, and the person is thought to have gone to the land of the dead (Ọrun). Ajá is considered one of the rarest imọlẹ (earth spirits) because she reveals herself to humans and not to harm or scare them.
