= Ọlọrun =

Supreme Being in the Yoruba religion

- Monarch of Ọrun, Supreme Monarch of Deities, Sky, Earth, Universe
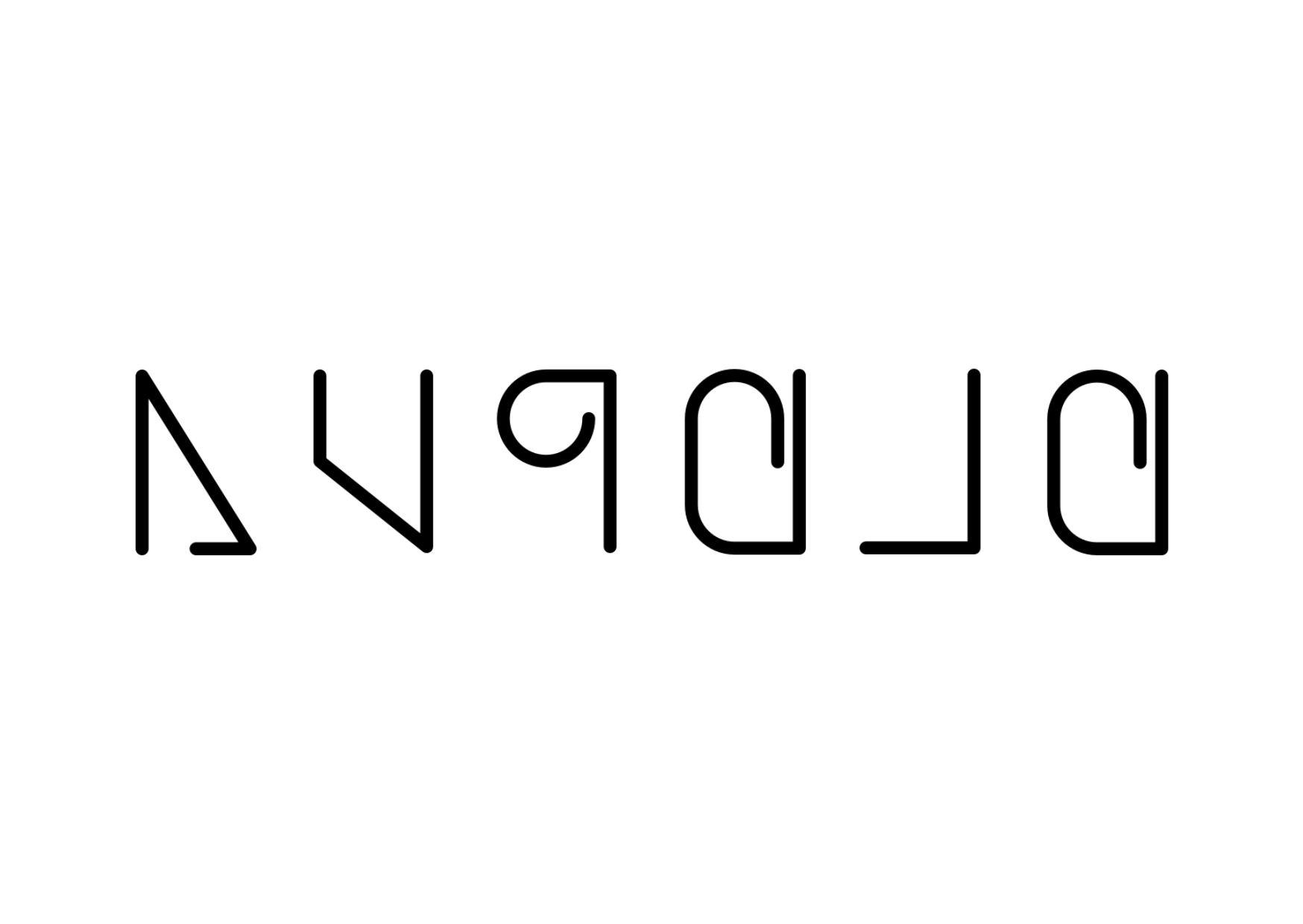
- Ọlọrun in Oduduwa script
- Other names: Olorun, Olodumare, Olofin-Orun, Olofi, Ọlọfin
- Venerated in: Yoruba religion, Umbanda, Candomble, Santeria, Haitian Vodou, Folk Catholicism
- Abode: Ọrun
- Region: Yorubaland, parts of Latin America
- Ethnic group: Yoruba

Ọlọrun (Yoruba alphabet: Ọlọrun) (Ede languages: Ɔlɔrun) is the ruler of (or in) the Heavens, creator of the universe, and the Supreme Deity or Supreme Being in the Yoruba religion and related syncretic religions. Ọlọrun is also called numerous other names including Olodumare (Yoruba alphabet: Olódùmarè), Eledumare and Eleduwa/Eledua. However, in some belief systems the different names refer to particular deities or aspects of the same deity.

== Etymology ==
From the Yoruba language, Ọlọrun's name is a contraction of the words oní (which denotes ownership or rulership) and ọ̀run (which means the Heavens, abode of the spirits).

Another name, Olodumare, comes from the phrase "O ní odù mà rè" which could mean "the owner of the source of creation that does not become empty," "or the All Sufficient".

An alternate proposition, by the Odu Ifá, is that Olodumare comes from the phrase "Oni odù-ikoko ti n tan oṣumare" which means "the owner of the pot from which the rainbow shines", an etymology referencing the events of the creation myth attested in the literary corpus.

== Yoruba ==
In Yoruba culture, Ọlọrun is credited with creating the universe and all living things. Ọlọrun is frequently perceived as a compassionate entity who protects its creations and is thought to be omnipotent, omniscient, and omnipresent. People do not worship Olorun directly; there are no sacred areas of worship, no iconography.

Ọlọrun's ordained are known to be Oriṣa, divine beings of whom Obatala is King, who govern, regulate and sustain the physical realm (Ayé). Olorun is outlying, distant, and does not partake in human rituals. There are no shrines or sacrifices dedicated directly to them, although followers can send prayers in their direction.

For Yoruba traditions, there is no centralized authority; because of this, there are many different ways that Yoruba people and their descendants or orisha-based faiths can understand the idea of Ọlọrun.

Historically, the Yoruba worship Ọlọrun through the agency of the oriṣa; thus there is no direct image, shrine or sacrifice for the deity. It is generally believed that Ọlọrun is manifest in all of existence, and the believer is therefore bound to be grateful and loving towards all beings. However, there are those who also worship them directly, believing the deity to be the origin of virtue and mortality, and bestower of the knowledge of things upon all persons when they are born. Ọlọrun is omnipotent, transcendent, unique, all knowing, good, and evil. The Yoruba have a dialectical view and understanding of evil, and believe its existence is necessary for cosmic balance; without evil (ìbì), there cannot be good (ìré). Thus, the Yoruba thought does not face the problem of evil. The deity's manifestations are supernatural beings, both good (oriṣa) and bad (ajogun), who represent human activity and natural forces, and who maintain universal equilibrium.

== Trinidad Orisha ==
The one supreme God in Trinidad Orisha is Olodumare, the Yoruba deity who created the Ayé, the world of the living, visible to us, and the Orun, the invisible spiritual world of the gods, spirits, and ancestors. They (Olodumare) are the Creator of the cosmology and all that exists.

== Santería ==
Santería teaches the existence of an overarching divinity, known as Olodumare, Olofi, or Olorun. Practitioners believe that this divinity created the universe but takes little interest in human affairs. As this creator deity is inaccessible to humanity, no major offerings are dedicated to them. The three facets of this divinity are understood slightly differently; Olodumare represents the divine essence of all that exists, Olorun is regarded as the creator of all beings, while Olofi dwells in all creation. In taking a triplicate form, this deity displays similarities with the Christian Trinity.

== Gender ==
Ọlọrun has no gender in the Ifá Literary Corpus, and is always referred to as an entity who exists in spiritual form only. Christian missionaries, such as Bolaji Idowu, aimed to reinterpret traditional Yoruba culture as consistent with Christian theology as a way of pushing conversion. The first translation of the Bible into Yoruba in the late 1800s by Samuel Ajayi Crowther controversially adopted traditional Yoruba names, such as "Olodumare/Olorun" for "God" and "Eṣu" for the devil, and thus began associating Olorun with the male gender.

== Epithets ==
- Ọlọrun Olodumare or Eledumare: The "Supreme Creator," "the All-Sufficient," or "the owner of the source of creation that does not become empty".
- Olofin Ọrun or Olofi: "Royal-one of Heaven" or the "owner of the law of Heaven".
- Ọlọrun Ẹlẹda: "Ọlọrun the Creator".
- Ọlọrun Ọga Ogo: "Ọlọrun the Head of glory".
- Ọlọrun Olowo: "Ọlọrun the Venerable One".
- Ọlọrun Ẹlẹmi: "Ọlọrun the Owner of Breath/Souls" or "Possessor of Breath/Souls", signifying that all life is at their mercy.
- Ọlọrun Ọba a se kan: "Ọlọrun the King who can do anything" or "The all-mighty".
- Ọlọrun Alagbara: "Ọlọrun the Powerful".
- Ọlọrun Atọbajẹ: "Ọlọrun the one who is sufficient to be King".

== Modern influence ==
- Olorun is mentioned in the song "The Rhythm of the Saints" from the 1990 album The Rhythm of the Saints by Paul Simon.
- Olorun is mentioned in the song "Lua Soberana" from the 1992 album Brasileiro by Sérgio Mendes (composed by Vítor Martins and Ivan Lins).
- The name of the popular African-Brazilian percussive group, "Olodum" is derived from Olodumare.
- Olorun appears as one of the gods in the 2014 video game Smite.
- Eledumare is mentioned in the 2018 song "Soco" by Starboy featuring Wizkid.
- Eledua is mentioned in the 2022 song "Trenches" by the Nigerian singer, Skiibii.

== See also ==
- Oriṣa - tutelary deities created by Ọlọrun
- Ajogun - malevolent deities created by Ọlọrun
- Obatala - king of the Oriṣa
- Aṣẹ - Yoruba concept of natural energy
- Agẹmọ - chameleon servant of Olorun.
- Yoruba religion - comprisal of Yoruba religious beliefs
- Diffused monotheism - belief in a Supreme Being who assigns authority to many lesser divinities
- Conceptions of God

== Sources ==
- Adebola Omolara Adebileje, ' "A Comparative Description of Affixation Processes in English and Yoruba"
- Asante, Molefi K. and Ama Mazama, editors. Encyclopedia of African Religion. Thousand Oaks, CA: Sage Publications, Inc., 2009. Sage Knowledge, 13 Apr 2023, doi:10.4135/9781412964623.
- Fernández Olmos, Margarite; Paravisini-Gebert, Lizabeth (2011). Creole Religions of the Caribbean: An Introduction from Vodou and Santería to Obeah and Espiritismo (second ed.). New York and London: New York University Press. ISBN 978-0814762288.
- Flores-Peña, Ysamur (2005). "Lucumí: The Second Diaspora". In Helen A. Berger (ed.). Witchcraft and Magic: Contemporary North America. Philadelphia: University of Pennsylvania Press. pp. 102–119. ISBN 978-0812238778.
- Idowu, E. Bôlaji., Olódùmarè: God in Yorùbá Belief, London, Longmans, 1962.
- Mason, Michael Atwood (1994). ""I Bow My Head to the Ground": The Creation of Bodily Experience in a Cuban American Santería Initiation". The Journal of American Folklore. 107 (423): 23–39. doi:10.2307/541071. JSTOR 541071.
- Mason, Michael Atwood (2002). Living Santería: Rituals and Experiences in an Afro-Cuban Religion. Washington, DC: Smithsonian Books. ISBN 978-1588340528.
- Ogumefu, M. I., Yorùbá Legends, London, The Sheldon Press, 1929.
- Sandoval, Mercedes C. (1979). "Santeria as a Mental Health Care System: An Historical Overview". Social Science and Medicine. 13B (2): 137–51. doi:10.1016/0160-7987(79)90009-7. PMID 505056.
- Wedel, Johan (2004). Santería Healing: A Journey into the Afro-Cuban World of Divinities, Spirits, and Sorcery. Gainesville: University Press of Florida. ISBN 978-0813026947.
