= Iya Nla =

Deity in Yoruba cosmology

Ìyá Nlá is the primordial spirit of all creation in Yoruba cosmology. She is believed to be the source of all existence. Iya Nla literally means “Great Mother” in the Yoruba language (Ìyá: Mother; Nlá: Big or Great). In The Gẹ̀lẹ̀dẹ́ Spectacle: Art, Gender, and Social Harmony in an African Culture, art historian Babatunde Lawal reveals that Ìyá Nlá in Yoruba cosmology is the orisha who is the “Mother of All Things, including the deities.” Lawal also asserts that the female principle in nature has been personified as Ìyá Nlá (The Great Mother), whereby human beings can relate to one another as children of the same mother.” Teresa N. Washington’s Our Mothers, Our Powers, Our Texts: Manifestations of Àjẹ́ in Africana Literature, states that Ìyá Nlá — the Mother of All, who is also known as Yewájọbí, Odù, Odùduwà, and Àjẹ́ — is not merely an orisha; Ìyá Nlá is the primordial force of all creation.
