= Ajogun =

Malevolent divinities in Yoruba religion

In Yoruba religion, the Ajogun are malevolent spiritual forces or deities that interfere regularly with mortal lives. The Ajogun are seen as the polar opposite of the benevolent Oriṣa and are believed to be in constant battle with them and at war with mankind, maintaining cosmic balance. They are 200 in number (Note: Due to inconsistencies in oral tradition, this number varies.) but are led by eight spirits, of whom the spirit of death, Iku, is the head.

== Etymology ==
The Yoruba word Ajogun comes from the agent prefix a-, the verb jẹ (“to eat" or "to consume”) and the noun ogun (“war”). It literally means “the ones that feed on war”.

== Beliefs ==
The Yoruba believe that the Ajogun can be self-inflicted by someone who breaks taboos or refuses to heed the advice of Ifá divination. Although the Ajogun are not worshipped, they can be warded off or appeased by offering sacrifices and prayers to them through intercession by the deity Eṣu. Death, Ìkú, is the chief of the Ajogun. In Yoruba folktales he (Note: Iku is considered a metaphysical personification and can be described as a male, female or genderless entity.) is sometimes described as a young warrior or haggard old man carrying a heavy club used to kill victims simply by touching them. There are also stories of humans and even divinities running away and hiding from him, or trying to get him to spare them. According to the Odu Ifa, Iku could not be defeated by even Eṣu, but was outwitted by the deity Ọrunmila.

== List of Ajogun ==
- Iku - The spirit of death. It is considered the head of the Ajogun.
- Arun - The spirit of disease and illness.
- Ẹgba - The spirit of paralysis and infirmity.
- Epe - The spirit of curses.
- Eṣe - The spirit of wounds and affliction.
- Ẹwọn - The spirit of imprisonment/captivity.
- Ofo - The spirit of loss and destruction of property.
- Ọran - The spirit of conflict and trouble.

== See also ==
- Oriṣa
- List of Yoruba deities
- Asura
- Titans
- Abiku
