= Eshu =

Deity in the Yoruba religion

Èṣù
- Travelers; Messengers; Crossroads
- Member of Irunmole
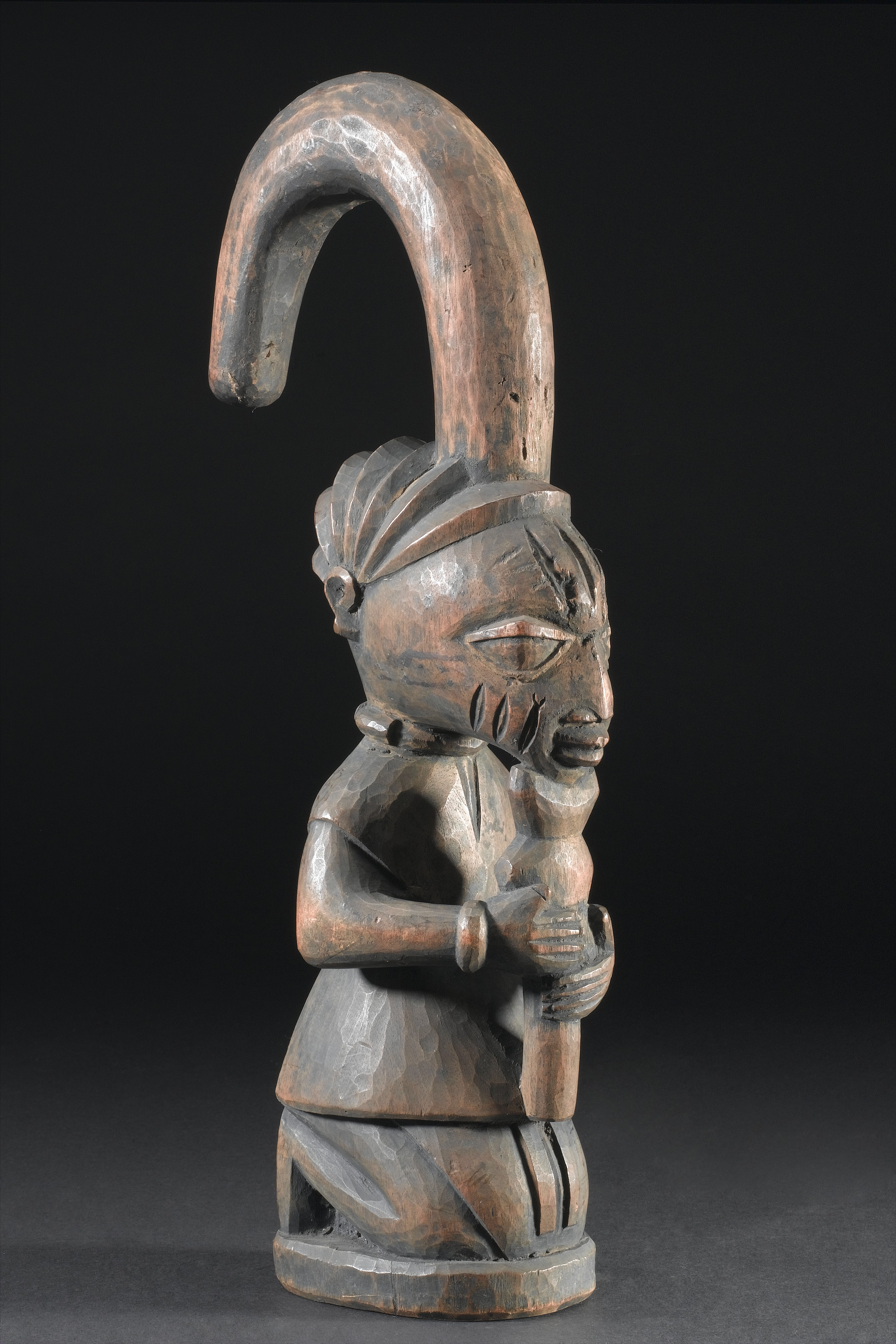
- A wooden figure of Eshu
- Other names: Eshu; Echú; Exú; Ẹlẹgba; Ẹlẹgbara; Ọdara; Láàlú; Láàróyè
- Venerated in: Yoruba religion, Santería, Candomblé, Umbanda
- Day: The second day of the Kọjọda week
- Region: Yorubaland, Latin America
- Ethnic group: Yoruba people
- Festivals: Eṣu Festival

Equivalents
- Greek: Hermes
- Vodún: Papa Legba

Èṣù (Note: Also known as Ẹlẹ́jẹ̀lú, Olúlànà, Ọbasìn, Láarúmọ̀, Ajọ́ńgọ́lọ̀, Ọba Ọ̀dàrà ("who has his abode at crossroads"), Onílé Oríta, Ẹlẹ́gbára Ọ̀gọ, Olóògùn Àjíṣà, Láàlú Ògiri Òkò, Láàlù Bara Ẹlẹ́jọ́, and Láaróyè Ẹbọra tí jẹ́ Látọpa.) is the oriṣa of trickery, chance, crossroads, judgement, duality and languages in the Yoruba religion. Eṣu is a prominent primordial divinity (a delegated Irúnmọlẹ̀ sent by Olodumare) who descended from Ìkọ̀lé Ọ̀run, and the chief enforcer of natural and divine laws. He is in charge of law enforcement and orderliness. As the Yoruba religion spread around the world, the name of this Orisha has varied in different locations, but the beliefs remain similar.

== Beliefs ==
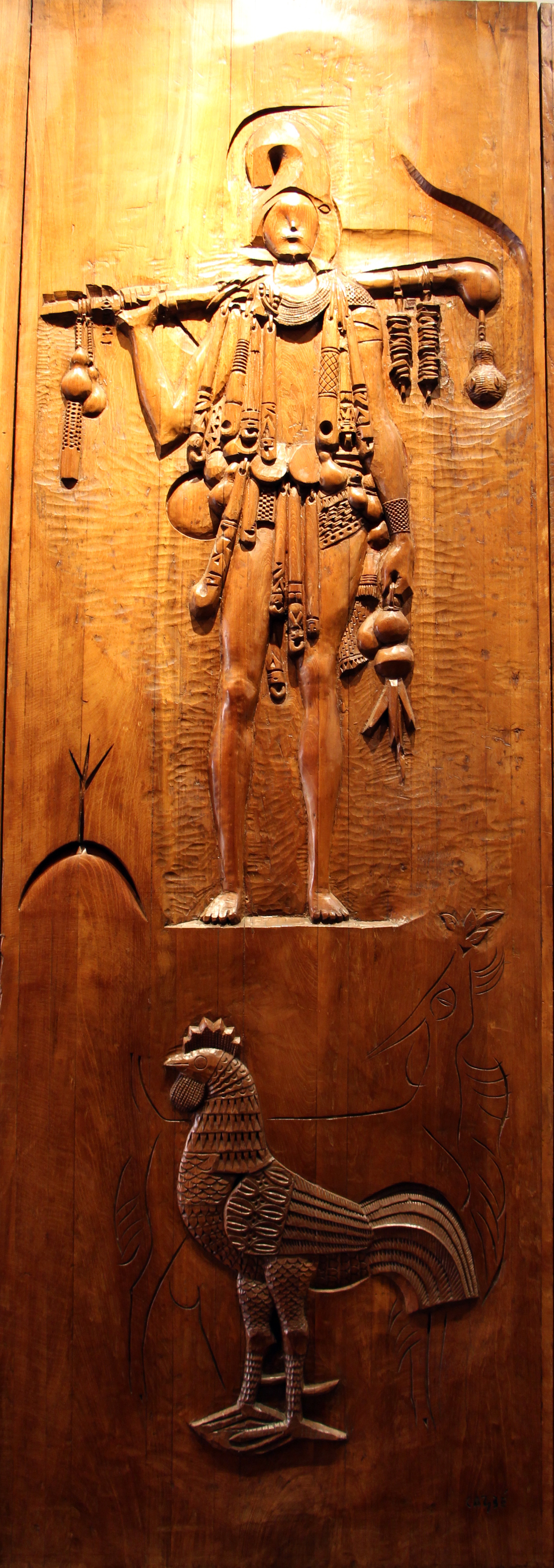
Eṣu in a carving by Carybé

Eṣu is the messenger and intermediary between the Ajogun (malevolent spirits), the Oriṣa (benevolent spirits) and ẹ̀dá èniyàn (human beings); he distributes and supervises the distribution of sacrifices (ẹbọ) made by humans to the Oriṣa and Ajogun. Amulets in the form of Eshu covered with divination boards are used in some Yoruba traditions.

Eṣu is described as powerful and ubiquitous to the extent of having every day of the four-day traditional Yorùbá week as his day of worship (Ọjọ́ Ọ̀ṣẹ̀), unlike all other Irunmọlẹ and Oriṣa (primordial divinities and deified ancestor spirits; "ọjọ́ gbogbo ni ti Èṣù Ọ̀darà"). The cognomen "A bá ni wá àrà bá ò rí dá" (He who wilfully creates wonder for one that seeks where none exist) highlights the nature of Èṣù Ọba Ọ̀dàrà across all strata of Yorùbá society in general and of spiritual communities in particular.

== Names and roles ==
The name of Eshu varies around the world: in Yorùbáland, Eshu is Èṣù-ẹ̀lẹgba or Láàlú, "okiri òkò" ; Exu de Candomblé in Candomblé; Echú in Santería and Latin America; Legba in Haitian Vodou; Leba in Winti; Exu de Quimbanda in Quimbanda; Obi in Birongo, Lucero in Palo Mayombe; and Exu in Latin America.

Èṣù partially serves as an alternate name for Elegua, the messenger for all Orishas. There are 256 paths to Elegua—each one of which is an Eshu. It is believed that Èṣù of the Ìṣẹ̀ṣe religion is an Òrìṣà similar to Elegua, but there are only 101 paths to Eshu according to ocha, rather than the 256 paths to Elegua according to Ifá. Èṣù is known as the "Father who gave birth to Ogboni", and is also thought to be agile and always willing to rise to a challenge.

Both Ocha and Ifá share some paths, however. Eshu Ayé is said to work closely with all Òrìṣà, including Olokun, and is thought to walk on the shore of the beach. Èṣù Bi is a stern and forceful avatar who appears as both an old man and young boy, who walked with Shangó and Oyá (the initial two Ibeyi), and Eshu Bi protects both of these, as well as all other small children. Eshu Laroye is an avatar believed to be the companion of Oshún and believed to be one of the most important Eshus, and the avatar of Eshu Laroye is thought to be talkative and small.

Èṣù is always at the middle of divergent world forces. He controls and regulates the two extremes – the world of happiness, joy, and fulfilment, as well as the arena of destruction, hopelessness, and sorrow.

Èṣù always demands from those who have to give to those demanded for it within the premises of sacrifices, rituals, and propitiation. He maintains the delicate balance of good and bad – just and unjust. He protects towns and villages, priests and priestesses (àwọn Ẹlẹ́gùn - tí wọ́n ní ẹ̀rẹ́ ní Ìpàkọ́), and devotees and Awos against evil machinations, always favouring those that performed the necessary and appropriate sacrifices (ẹbọs) and other forms of rituals; "ẹni tó bá rúbọ l'Èṣù ń gbè"!

Èṣù Láàlù is a bosom friend, working partner, confidant, and close associate of Ọrunmila, the one who practises and teaches Ifá, an esoteric language of Olódùmarè (containing divine messages of life) through a very complex divinatory system, and who also teaches wisdom.

== Brazil ==
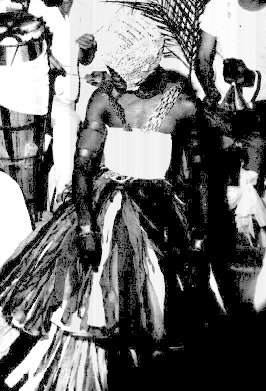
Exu manifested in an initiate of Candomblé in Brazil.

Exu is known by various forms and names in Afro-Brazilian religions. They include Akesan; Alafiá; Alaketo; Bará, or Ibará; Elegbá, or Elegbará, Inan; Lalu, or Jelu; Laroyê; Lon Bií; Lonã; Odara; Olodé; Tamenta, or Etamitá; Tiriri. The most common forms or praise-names of Exu are Exu-Agbo, the protector and guardian of houses and terreiros; Exu-Elepô, the god of palm oil; Exu lnã, the god of fire; and Exu Ojixé, a messenger god.

=== Candomblé ===
A shrine dedicated to Exu is located outside of the main terreiro of a Candomblé temple, usually near the entrance gate. It is, in general, made of a simple mound of red clay. These shrines are similar to those found in Nigeria.

Ritual foods offered to Exu include palm oil; beans; corn, either in the form of cornmeal or popcorn; and farofa, a manioc flour. Male birds, four-legged and other animals are offered as sacrifice to Exu. In each offering made to an orixá, a part of the food is separated and dedicated to Exu.

=== Umbanda ===
In the syncretic religion of Umbanda, Exu may have a different meaning. Usually in Umbanda Exu is not considered a single deity, but many different spirits. Some of the most popular Exus are Exu Caveira ("Skull Exu", represented as a skeleton), Exu Tranca-Rua ("Street Locker", opener and closer of spiritual ways) and Exu Mirim ("Little Exu", a spirit that resembles the personality of a child or teenager). In Umbanda, a Pombagira (female consort of Exu) may also be considered a kind of Exu, commonly venerated in the practice of Brazilian love magic.

== Mistranslation ==
The translation errors of English-speaking missionaries resulted in the Yorùbá word Èṣù being rendered and returned as "devil" or "satan" in the mid nineteenth century. The first known instance of this came from the freed slave turned Christian, Bishop Samuel Ajayi Crowther's "Vocabulary of the Yoruba" (1842) where his entries for "Satan" and "devil" had Esu in English. Subsequent dictionaries over the years have followed suit, permeating popular culture and Yorùbá societies as well. Lately, many online campaigns have been set up to protest this, and many activists have worked to correct it. There have also been numerous academic works examining the mistranslation.

The translation on Google Translate took up the same earlier mistranslations. This led to a number of online campaigns until 2016 when Nigerian linguist and writer Kola Tubosun, then an employee at Google, first changed it back to less derogatory connotations. When the changes were reverted, he changed them again in 2019. The translation for Èṣù to English now remains "Èṣù" while "devil" and "satan" translate to "bìlísì" and "sàtánì" respectively. Tubosun's 2024 collection of poetry Èṣù at the Library pays literary homage to this episode.

== Modern influence ==
- Eshu appears in K. A. Applegate's fantasy series Everworld, serving as the main antagonist of its eighth book, Brave the Betrayal. He is a trickster god who tries many times to emotionally manipulate and mentally break the book's narrator, Jalil Sherman, but is ultimately defeated when Jalil proves too strong to give in to his mental tricks and magical illusions.
- In the 2002 film Cidade de Deus, the drug lord Dadinho (Lil Dice) is renamed as Zé Pequeno (Lil Z) in a Candomblé ritual devoting himself to Exu.
- Eshu appears in 2025's Castlevania: Nocturne S2E4 as a three headed spirit with horns to guide the protagonist Annette. Annette first believes she is seeing the devil who has come to claim the souls of the damned, but when she discovers the benevolent spirit is trying to guide her to the Spirit World she sees him as Papa Legba, who is a Voodoo Loa known as the guardian of crossroads and whose origin was possibly inspired by Eshu.
- The 1974 blaxploitation film Abby features Eshu, but mostly as a deranged and ruthless sex deity that possesses a young woman and causes her to sexually assault and brutally murder various men in the process.
- Eshu appears as the main antagonist of the film Scooby-Doo! Ghastly Goals.
- The 2016 crime film The Infiltrator features a "priest" of Eshu employed by the Medellín cartel who tests the loyalty of Robert Musella (Bryan Cranston), an undercover federal agent working in Operation C-Chase.
- Eshu features in the stage name "Eshu Tune" of rapper and comedian Hannibal Buress.
- Eshu features as a main character in season 2 of the 2025 animated series Tomb Raider: The Legend of Lara Croft.
- Eshu appears in the 2003 novel The Good House (novel) by Tananarive Due. Eshu serves as a significant spiritual figure related to communication between humans and deities, the guardian of the crossroads, and an enforcer of divine justice, around whom much of the supernatural plot revolves.

== See also ==
- Shango
- Ogun
- Elegua
- Ajogun
- Kalfu
