= Yoruba religion =

West-African religion

Iṣẹṣe
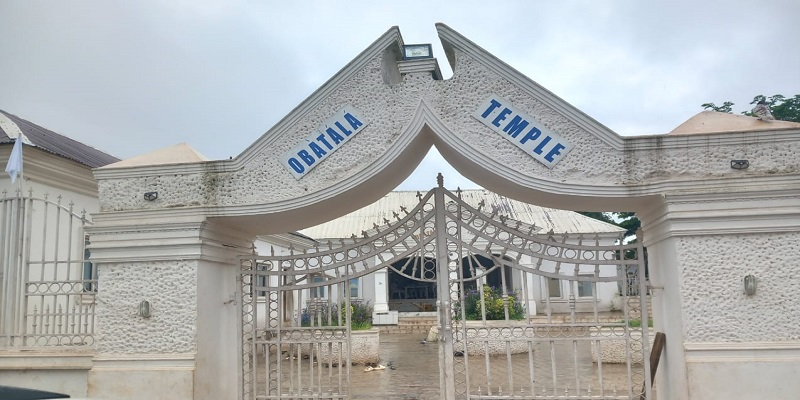
- The Temple of Obatala in Ile-Ife, Ọ̀ṣun.
- Classification: African
- Scripture: Odu Ifa
- Theology: Diffused monotheism
- Region: Global
- Language: Yoruba
- Number of followers: est. several millions ▲ (referred to as Oniṣẹṣe)

The Yorùbá religion (Yoruba: Ìṣẹ̀ṣe [ìʃɛ̀ʃē]), West African Orisha (Òrìṣà [òɾìʃà]), or Isese (Ìṣẹ̀ṣe), comprises the traditional religious and spiritual concepts and practice of the Yoruba people. Its homeland is in what is commonly known as Yorubaland (Ilẹ̀ Yorùbá), comprising the majority of the states of Oyo, Ogun, Osun, Ondo, Ekiti, Kwara, Lagos and parts of Kogi in present-day Southwestern Nigeria; the Departments of Collines, Oueme, Plateau in Southern Benin; and the adjoining parts of Central Togo. It has become the largest indigenous African religion / belief system in the world with several million adherents worldwide.

Yoruba religion shares some parallels with Vodun, practised by the neighbouring Fon and Ewe peoples to its west and with the religion of the Edo people to its east. It is also the basis for several religions in the New World, notably Santería, Umbanda, Trinidad Orisha, and Candomblé. Yorùbá religious beliefs are considered part of Ìtàn (history), the total complex of songs, histories, stories, and other cultural concepts which make up the Yorùbá society.

== Terminology ==
The Yorùbá name for the Yorùbá indigenous religion is Ìṣẹ̀ṣẹ, which also refers to the traditions and rituals that encompass Yorùbá culture. The term comes from a contraction of the words Ìṣẹ̀ (Ishɛ), meaning "source/root origin/beginning", and ìṣe (Ishe), meaning "practice/tradition" coming together to mean "The original tradition"/"The tradition of antiquity", as many of the practices, beliefs, traditions, and observances of the Yorùbá originate from the religious worship of Olodumare and the veneration of the Orisha.

== Beliefs ==
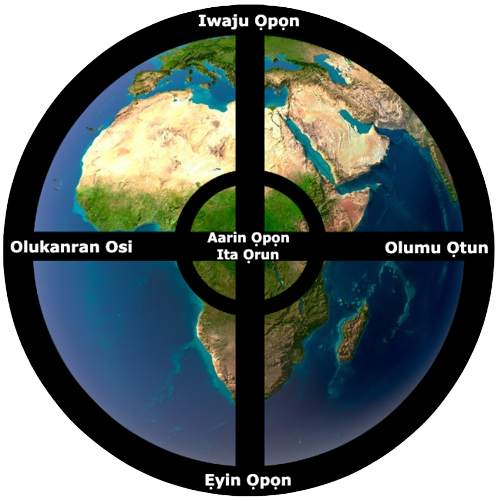
A symbol of the Yorùbá religion (Ìṣẹ̀ṣe) with labels

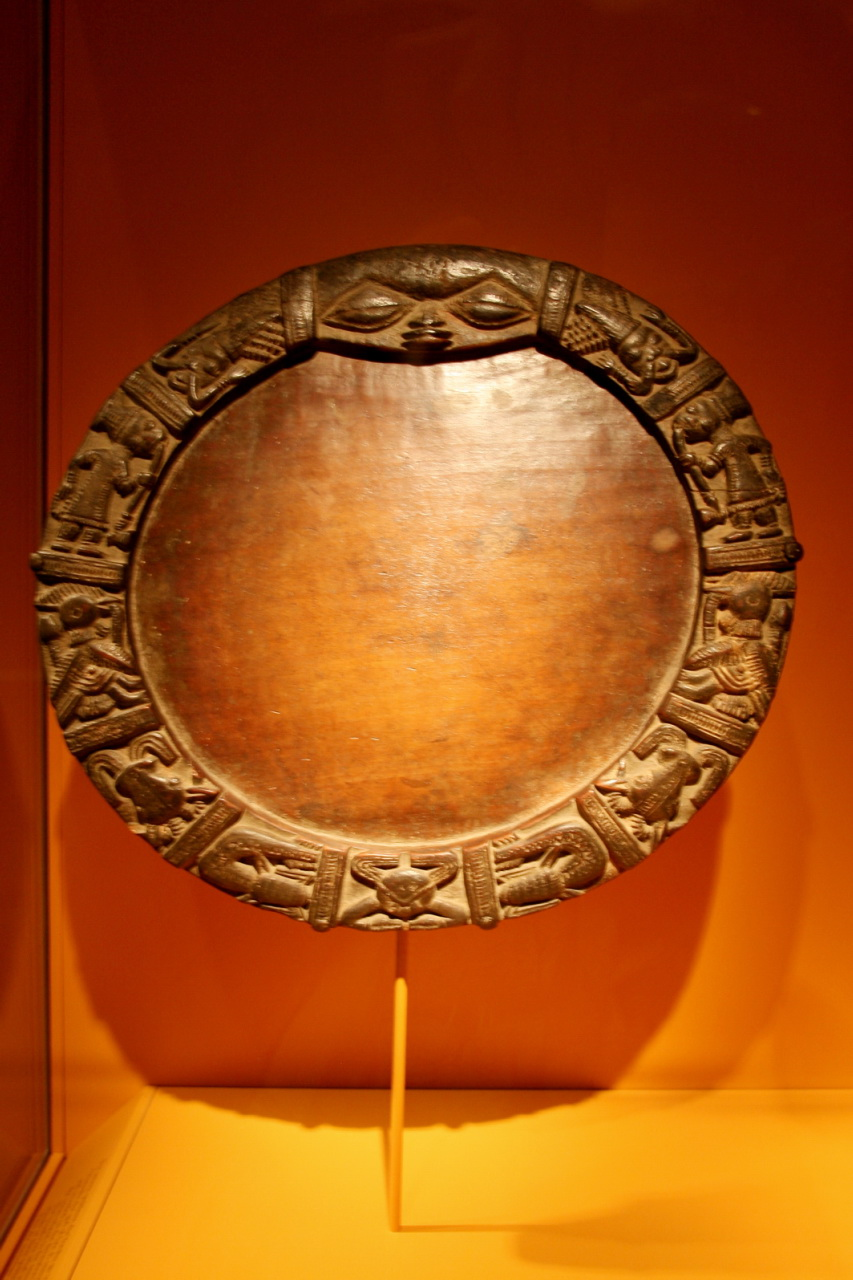
Yorùbá divination board Opon Ifá

According to Kola Abimbola, the Yorubas have evolved a robust cosmology. Nigerian Professor for Traditional African religions, Jacob K. Olupona, summarizes that central for the Yorùbá religion, and which all beings possess, is known as "Aṣẹ", which is "the empowered word that must come to pass," the "life force" and "energy" that "regulates all movement and activity in the universe". Every thought and action of each person or being in Ayé (the physical realm) interact with the Supreme force, all other living things, including the Earth itself, as well as with Ọrun (the otherworld), in which gods, spirits and ancestors exist. The Yorùbá religion can be described as a form of diffused monotheism, with a Supreme but distant creator force, encompassing the whole universe.

=== Reincarnation ===
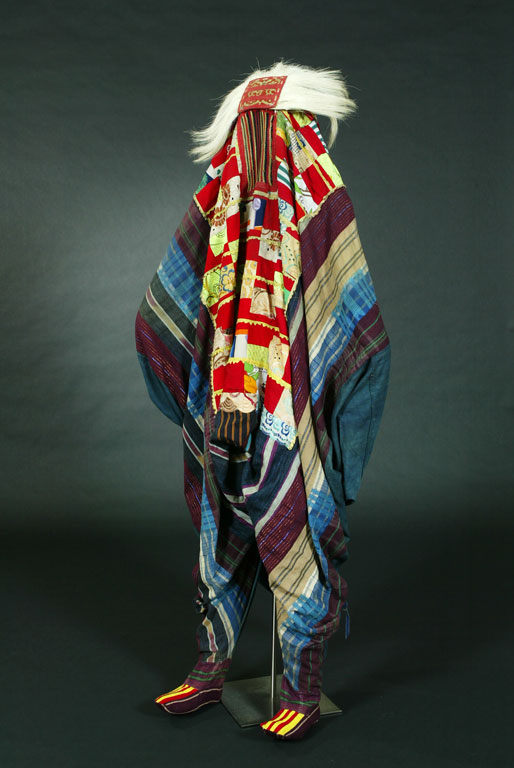
An Egungun masquerade dance garment in the permanent collection of The Children's Museum of Indianapolis

The Yoruba believe in Atunwa, the possibility of reincarnation within the family. The names Babatunde (father returns), Yetunde (Mother returns), Babatunji (Father wakes once again) and Sotunde (The wise man returns) all offer vivid evidence of the Ifa concept of familial or lineal rebirth. There is no simple guarantee that one's grandfather or great uncle will "come back" in the birth of a child, however.

Whenever the time arrives for a spirit to return to Earth (otherwise known as The Marketplace) through the conception of a new life in the direct bloodline of the family, one of the component entities of a person's being returns, while the other remains in Heaven (Ikole Ọrun). The spirit that returns does so in the form of a Guardian Ori. One's Guardian Ori, which is represented and contained in the crown of the head, represents not only the spirit and energy of one's previous blood relative, but the accumulated wisdom he or she has acquired through myriad lifetimes. This is not to be confused with one's spiritual Ori, which contains personal destiny, but instead refers to the coming back to The Marketplace of one's personal blood Ori through one's new life and experiences. The Primary Ancestor (which should be identified in your Itefa) becomes—if you are aware and work with that specific energy—a "guide" for the individual throughout their lifetime. At the end of that life they return to their identical spirit self and merge into one, taking the additional knowledge gained from their experience with the individual as a form of payment.

== Gender roles ==
Gender roles are essential components of Yoruba religion, with women occupying significant positions as priestesses and custodians of sacred knowledge. These roles are vital for the preservation of religious practices and influence the dynamics of spiritual authority within communities. Yoruba traditions recognize femininity as a crucial aspect of spiritual experiences. Women actively participate in religious practices and rituals, enhancing their influence and importance in the spiritual landscape.

The anthropologist Robert Voeks described Yorùbá religion as being animistic, noting that it was "firmly attached to place".

Each person living on earth attempts to achieve perfection and find their destiny in Ọ̀run-Rere (the spiritual realm of those who do good and beneficial things).

One's orí-inú (spiritual consciousness in the physical realm) must grow in order to consummate union with one's "Ìpọ̀nrí" (Orí Ọ̀run, spiritual self).

Ìwà pẹ̀lẹ́ (or good character), meditative recitation and sincere veneration are sufficient to strengthen the orí-inú of most people. Well-balanced people, it is believed, can make positive use of the simplest form of connection between their Ori and the omnipotent Olú-Ọ̀run: an Àwúre (petition or prayer) for divine support.

In the Yorùbá belief system, Olódùmarè has àṣẹ (divine authority) over all that is. Hence, they are considered supreme.

== Scripture ==
The Yorùbá scriptures are called the Odù Ifá, which is a collection of revealed oracular texts originally passed down through oral tradition among babalawos. It is traditionally divided into 256 sections, or Odù, which are divided into verses. It is closely related to the divination system of the Yorùbá religion, Ifá. The verses contain proverbs, stories, and statements that cover every aspect of life. The Odù Ifá is the foundation of Yorùbá spiritual knowledge and has influenced spiritual communities in the Americas, such as Santeria. Ifá refers to the deity Ọ̀rúnmìlà, who is associated with wisdom, intellect, and divination.

In 2005, UNESCO designated the Odù Ifá tradition as one of the world's Masterpieces of the Oral and Intangible Heritage of Humanity.

== Cosmology ==
- Olodumare
  - Irunmole
    - Orisha
      - Oku (Ancestors)
        - Alaye (Human)
          - Animal, Plant, etc.

=== Olódùmarè ===
Olódùmarè is recognized in Yorùbá belief as the Supreme Being and the ultimate source of all creation. Everything that exists—Òrìṣà, human beings, animals, nature, and spiritual forces—originates from Olódùmarè. As the divine architect of the universe, Olódùmarè holds the highest authority and is the giver of àṣẹ, the sacred energy that sustains and empowers all life.

Olódùmarè is the most important "state of existence". "They" are the owner of all heads, for during human creation, Olódùmarè gave "èmí" (the breath of life) to humankind. In this, Olódùmarè is Supreme. Perhaps one of the most important human endeavours extolled within the Odu Ifa is the quest to improve one's "Ìwà" (character, behaviour). In this way the teachings transcend religious doctrine, advising as they do that a person must also improve their civic, social and intellectual spheres of being; every Odu (stanza) of the sacred Ifá corpus has a portion covering the importance of "Ìwà". Central to this is the theme of righteousness, both individual and collective.

=== Creation ===
Adherents of the Yorùbá religion regard Olodumare as the principal force of creation.

According to one of the Yorùbá accounts of creation, at a certain stage in the process, the "truth" was sent to confirm the habitability of the planets that were newly formed. The earth, being one of these, was visited but considered too wet for conventional living.

After a successful period of time, a number of divinities led by Obatala were sent to accomplish the task of helping the earth develop its crust. On one of their visits to the realm, the arch-divinity Obàtálá took to the stage equipped with a mollusc that concealed some form of soil, winged beasts, and some cloth-like material. The contents were emptied onto what soon became a large mound on the surface of the water and soon after, the winged beasts began to scatter this around until the point where it gradually made into a large patch of dry land; the various indentations they created eventually becoming hills and valleys.

Ọbàtálá leapt onto a high ground and named the place Ife. The land became fertile and plant life began to flourish. From handfuls of earth, he began to mould figurines. Meanwhile, as this was happening on Earth, Olódùmarè gathered the gases from the far reaches of space and sparked an explosion that shaped into a fireball. He subsequently sent it to Ifẹ̀, where it dried much of the land and simultaneously began to bake the motionless figurines. It was at this point that Olódùmarè released the "breath of life" to blow across the land, and the figurines slowly came into "being" as the first people of Ife.

For this reason, Ife is locally referred to as "Ifẹ̀ Ọ̀ọ̀dáyé" – "cradle of existence".

=== Irunmọlẹ ===
The Irunmọlẹ are the original entities sent by Olorun to complete given tasks, often acting as liaisons between Òde Ọ̀run (the invisible realm) and Ilé Ayé (the physical realm). The Irúnmọlẹ̀ can therefore best be described in English as the highest ranking divinities; whereby such divinities are regarded as principal Orisha. The Irúnmọlẹ̀ or Imalẹ̀ are the primary foundational divinities or divine entities. In summary, all Imalẹ̀ are also Òrìṣà, but not all Òrìṣà are Imalẹ̀.

=== Oku ===
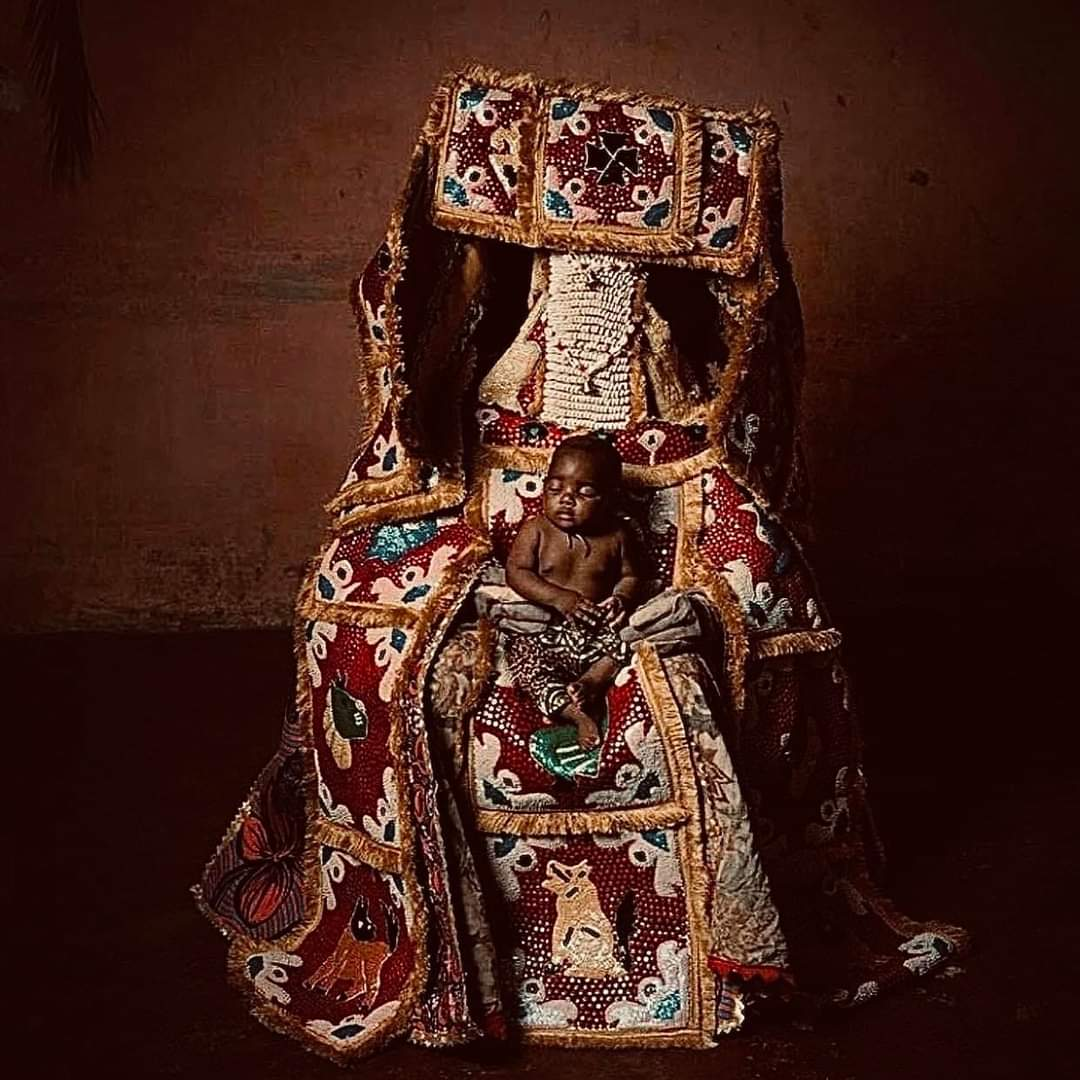
Egungun (Ara Orun) with an infant.

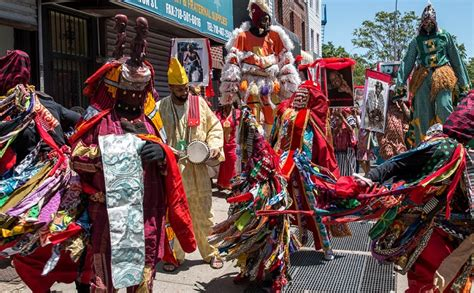
Egungun (Ara Orun)

In Yoruba religion and culture, Oku is a complex and multifaceted concept that encompasses various aspects of death, the afterlife, and the relationship between the living and the dead. Oku is often translated as "the dead," but it carries a deeper meaning that goes beyond the physical act of dying. Oku refers to the transition of a person from the world of the living to the world of the dead and the subsequent journey of the deceased to the afterlife.

Oku is a natural part of life, and death is seen as a transition to a new stage of existence rather than an end. The Yoruba people believe that the dead continue to play an active role in the lives of their descendants and that they can influence the living in various ways. Thus, Oku is also associated with the concept of "ara orun," which refers to the spiritual realm or the world of the dead. The Yoruba people believe that the dead reside in this realm, where they continue to live and interact with the living.

Furthermore, an earthly representation of the Oku is the Egungun, which embodies the spirits of the ancestors and is often used to communicate with the dead and to honour their memory. The Egungun is the physical representation of the Oku tradition, which is focused on honouring and paying respects to the ancestors. The Egungun possesses spiritual powers and to be able to communicate with the ancestors, an Oku tradition of seeking the blessings and protection of the dead or ancestors.

However, it is worth noting that Egungun traditions are not simply a representation of Oku, but rather have their own unique characteristics and significance, depending on the context. Egungun can have its own set of rituals, ceremonies, and practices that are separate from the Oku tradition, although the two are connected and closely intertwined. Therefore, Yoruba people may refer to Egungun as "Oku ara orun," which means "the Oku of the heavens" or "the Oku of the spirits." This name reflects the close connection between Egungun and the Oku tradition and highlights the role of Egungun as a representation of the ancestors and the spiritual realm.

== Orisha and Ajogun pantheon ==
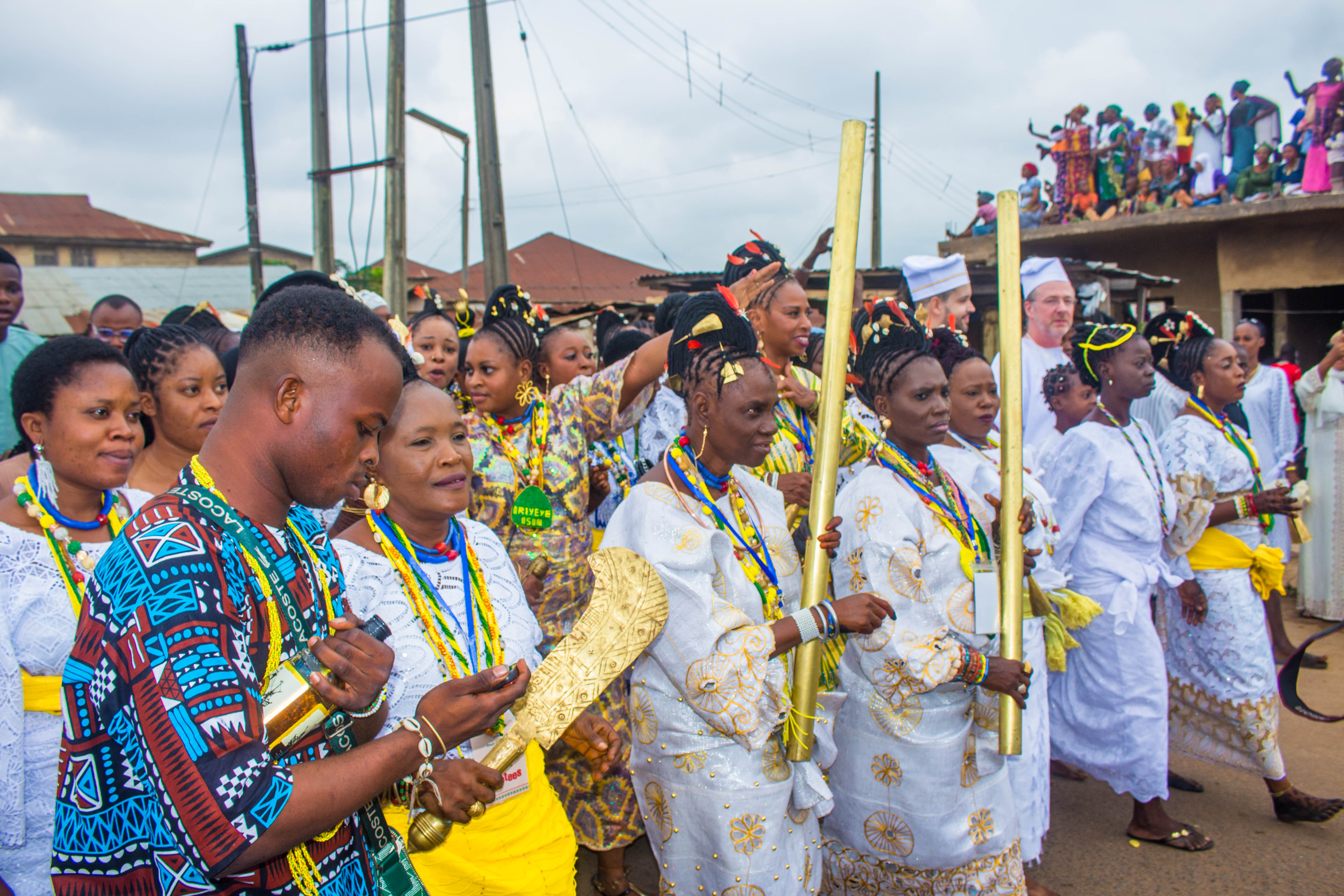
A procession of Ọṣun devotees

The Orisha, (Yoruba: Òrìṣà) are entities that possess the capability of reflecting some of the manifestations of Olodumare. Yoruba Orishas (commonly translated as "unique/special/selected heads") are often described as intermediaries between humankind and the supernatural. The term has also been variously translated as "Deities", "Divinities" or "Gods". Orisha(s) are revered for having control over specific elements of nature. They are thus sometimes referred to as Imole. There are those of their number that are more akin to ancient heroes and/or sages than to primordial divinities. These are best addressed as dema deities. Even though the term Orisha is often used to describe both classes of divine entities, it is properly reserved for the former one.

The Ajogun on the other hand are best described as active negative, destructive or malevolent forces of nature. They exist at the same operational plane as the Orisha but occupy counter positions and work against one's Ori. They represent the other side of the Yoruba duality of existence which can either be Ire, meaning goodness or being aligned with a person's destiny, or Ibi, often meaning evil or being out of alignment with one's destiny. Broken down, the term Ajogun comes from the words; A + Jẹ + Ogun, literally meaning; "That which feeds/thrives on trouble/war". The Ajogun are often personified as "warriors" who wage war against humanity. Out of their number, there are eight principal Ajogun led by 'Iku' (Death).

The Yoruba have developed a robust pantheon of divinities, each well-developed in their different rites and traditions. Many of these have attained national/pan Yoruba statuses and are known all across Yoruba country, even diffusing beyond Yorubaland into the practices and beliefs of neighbouring groups, though they may be more strongly or closely associated with certain places, occupations or subregions spread across Yorubaland. There are said to be thousands of them; of which the Irunmọlẹ (primordial divinities) are 400 plus 1 in total; The 200 of the right (Igba Ọ̀tún), the 200 of the left (Igba Òsì) and one more (used to mean that their exact number is unknown to humanity).

== Influence ==
=== African diaspora religions ===
During the period of the Transatlantic Slave Trade, many Yoruba were captured, sold, and transported to countries in the Americas, including Argentina, Brazil, Cuba, Colombia, the Dominican Republic, Puerto Rico, Trinidad and Tobago, St. Vincent & The Grenadines, Uruguay, and Venezuela. With them, they carried their religious beliefs. These were integrated into what now constitutes the core of the "New World lineages" which are a variety of Yorùbá-derived contemporary religions:

- Candomblé (Brazil, Argentina, Uruguay)
- Santería (Cuba, Puerto Rico, Dominican Republic)
- Trinidad Orisha (Trinidad and Tobago)
- Venezuelan spiritism (Venezuela)
- Spiritual Baptist (St. Vincent & The Grenadines)
- Umbanda (Brazil, Argentina, Uruguay)

In 1989, it was believed that more than 70 million individuals in Africa and the New World participated in the Yoruba religion in one way or another.

The Vodun faith, which originated amongst a different ethnic group (the Gbe speaking peoples of present-day Benin, Togo, and Ghana), holds influential aspects on the African diaspora in countries such as Haiti and Cuba, also New Orleans, Louisiana in the United States.

In Latin America, Yoruba religion has been in intense Syncretism with Christianity, Indigenous religions and Spiritism since the first arrival of African immigrants. In Brazil, the religion of Umbanda was born from the rich interaction of beliefs that Latin America provided. Followers of Umbanda typically consider themselves Monotheistic, but honor Catholic Saints and Orisha as manifestations from god or as Tutelary deities. Umbanda worship also include elements from Native South American rituals such as the ritual use of Tobacco and communication with the spirits of deceased Indian warriors (Caboclo).

In the 1949 documentary Fiestas de Santiago Apóstol en Loíza Aldea, anthropologist Ricardo Alegría noted a similar tendency at Loíza, Puerto Rico, arguing that the affinity between the black population in the municipality and the Catholic saint Santiago Apóstol may derive from the way in which he is depicted as a warrior; a similar theme to some depictions of Shango and Adams. This theory supposed that this resemblance was used by the population as a covert form to honor their ancestral deity.

In the early 21st century, Nigerian migrants have also taken Yoruba religion to Brazil.

=== Japan ===
Koshikawa Yoshiaki, professor of literature at Meiji University, became the first Japanese person to be initiated as a babalawo in 2013.

== List of major Orisha ==
Orisha	Other names	Description and attributes	Image	Earthly homes & Sites
Orí		Ori is the universal household and tutelary Orisha venerated by all in Yorubaland, as the custodian of fate. Hence, Ori is propitiated or appeased that one may have a good fate. When one has a balanced character, one obtains an alignment with one's Ori or divine self. The representing image of Ori is said to be 41 cowries strung together in the shape of a coronet or tiara, usually kept in a large coffer or enclosure called Ile Ori (Ori's house) made from the same material and is as large as the votary can afford/want it to be.	Symbol of the inner head (shibori) Africa Nigeria Yoruba people 19th-20th century leather glass beads cowrie shells Dallas Museum of Art	_______
Ọ̀runmìlà	Àgbọnìrègún; Ẹlẹ́rí Ìpín; Ẹ̀là; Àjànà; Òkìtìbiri	The Yoruba grand priest, sage and custodian of the Ifa oracle, source of knowledge who is believed to oversee the knowledge of the human form, purity, the cures of illnesses and deformities. Babalawos are Orumila's subordinates, who are priests, devotees, and followers. The light or illumination of Ifa itself is referred to as Ẹ̀là. Babalawos and Iyanifas invoke Ela's light when calling for Orunmila's presence. Orunmila is considered synonymous with or an avatar of Ẹ̀là by many and the name is often broken down as (Ọ̀run mí Ẹ̀là) meaning; Heaven brings forth revelation/light. Therefore, Ifa, Orunmila and Ela are all seen as aspects of the divine light which reveals things unknown - whether in the past, the present or the future.		Ado Ekiti. (Home) ________; Ilé Ifẹ̀. (Origin)
Èṣù (Ẹlẹ́gba)	Láróyè; Bàrà; Láàlú; Ògiri Òkò; Ọ̀dàrà; Látọ́pa	Often ill-translated as "The Devil" or "The Evil Being", Eshu is in truth neither of these. Best referred to as "The Trickster", he deals a hand of misfortune to those who do not offer tribute or are deemed to be spiritual novices. Also regarded as the "divine messenger", a prime negotiator between negative and positive forces in the body and an enforcer of the "law of being". He is said to assist in enhancing the power derived from herbal medicines and other forms of esoteric technology. Eshu is the Orisha of chance, accident and unpredictability. Because he is Olorun's linguist and the master of languages, Eshu is responsible for carrying messages and sacrifices from humans to the Sky God. Also known for his phallic powers and exploits, Eshu is said to lurk at gateways, on the highways and at the crossroads, where he introduces chance and accident into the lives of humans. He is known by a variety of names, including Elegbara.		Kétu, Benin. (Home) _______ Ìjẹ̀lú, Èkìtì. (Home) _______; Igbeti, Ọ̀yọ́. (Site) _______; Iworo, Lagos. (Site)
Òrìṣà Oko	Ajàngele	The Orisha of agriculture, open fields and rurality. He was known as a fighter against sorcery, a hunter who kept a dog and a flute- credited with the development of agricultural practices. He is associated with the annual new yam harvest. Honey bees are his messengers, and prepared Egusi (melon) seeds from Bara pods (plants in the Gourd family) are his favourite offering. Orisha Oko is represented with a large staff with rolls of copper (Bàbà) strings wound around its handle (Opa Orisha Oko) and an ivory flute. White chalk (Ẹfun) and ilarere cowrie necklaces are used by his male votaries.		Ifẹ̀, Osun. (Home, Origin) _______ Ìràwọ̀, Oyo State. (Home)
Ògún	Lákáayé; Aládá Méjì; Ọṣìn Imalẹ̀ Alágbẹ̀dẹ	Orisha of iron, war, heroism and metallurgy. He is venerated by all those who work with metals and technology.		Ilé Ifẹ̀, Ọ̀ṣun. (Origin) _______ Ìrè, Èkìtì. (Home) _______; Ṣakí, Ọ̀yọ́. (Associated)
Bàyànmi	Aladikun; Dàda; Bayanni; Àjàká; Báyọ̀ni	Bayanmi, Bayanni or Dada-Ajaka was a brother to Shango and another son of Oranyan. He was Alaafin of Oyo before Shango and again after him. He is the Orisha of birth, youngsters and children with natural hair of tufts that grow separately in tight curls (Dàda) and is often associated with prosperity. By some accounts, Dada Ajaka was actually the brother to Shango while Bayanmi was a female and a sister. However, the domains of both personages have become largely intertwined. He is strongly associated with the Yewa/Egbado region and his object is a diadem/coffer of cowries and pure white beads (Sese Efun) with several strings with a tipped top (Ṣónṣó Orí) called Ade Bayanni (Bayanmi's crown).		Àdìkun. (Home, Origin) _______; Ọ̀yọ́ Ilé (Associated)
Yemọja	Àwòyó; Olódò; Mọjẹlẹ́wù; Yemaja	Matron of the Ògùn River that flows from the upper regions of Ọ̀yọ́ State (Oke Ogun), through Ogun State and the city of Abeokuta, before emptying into the Lagos lagoon (Ọ̀sà); other smaller tributaries and streams are dedicated to Iyemọja throughout Yorùbáland; spiritual mother of Ṣàngó. According to Olorishas, she is the amniotic fluid in the womb of the pregnant woman, as well as the breasts which nurture. She is considered the protective energy of the feminine force. Her name is derived from the words; Yèyé-Ọmọ-Ẹja - Meaning; Mother of fish children, which is a metaphor for bodies of water with fish including lakes and the ocean.		Ilé Ifẹ̀, Ọ̀ṣun State. (Origin) _______ Ṣakí, Ọ̀yọ́ State. (Home) _______; Ibara, Abẹ́òkúta, Ògùn State. (Site)
Ọ̀ṣun	Yèyé; Ládékojú; Ẹ̀wùjí	A second wife of Shango, she is said to have entered into a river at Osogbo. The Yoruba clerics ascribed to her sensuality, beauty and gracefulness, symbolizing both their people's search for clarity and a flowing motion. She is associated with several powers, including abilities to heal with cool water, induction of fertility and the control of the feminine essence. Women appeal to her for child-bearing and for the alleviation of female disorders. The Yoruba traditions describe her as being fond of babies and her intervention is sought if a baby becomes ill. Oshun is also known for her love of honey and crocodiles are her messengers. Items closely associated with Oshun are; Brass fans (Abẹ̀bẹ̀), brass bells (Àjà), anklets and bangles (Ìdè), brass machetes (Àdá), brass hair pins (Ìkótí), red parrot feathers (Ikodídẹ) and brass combs (Òyìyà/Òòyà).		Ìgèdè, Èkìtì. (Home, Source) _______; Ìjùmú, Kogi. (Origin) _______; Òṣogbo, Osun. (Grove)
Ṣàngó	Jákúta; Ọba Kòso	Orisha of thunder and lightning. Associated with virility, masculinity, fire, lightning, stones, Oyo warriors and magnetism. He is said to have the ability to transform base substances into those that are pure and valuable. He was the Oba of Oyo at some point in its history. He derived his nickname Oba Koso from the tales of his immortality. Shango is the Orisha of the thunderbolt, said to have ruled in ancient times over the kingdom of Oyo. Also known as Jakuta (Stone Thrower) and as Oba Koso (The king does not hang). His wives are Oya, Oshun and Oba.		Ọ̀yọ́ Ilé. (Home) _______; Kòso, Kwara. (Site)
Erinlẹ̀	Eyinlẹ̀	A great hunter, fisherman and water lord Orisha had no wife and lived on the bank of the Erinle River. He is also known as a great healer. Some traditions credit him with starting the tradition of chanting Ijala, a traditional oral poetry with a characteristic nasal twang mostly performed by hunters (and mostly associated with Ogun) due to his loneliness. He is represented by smooth black stones from the Erinle River, a tributary stream which empties into the Osun River near Ede, placed in an earthenware filled with water. His objects are a staff of wrought iron with prongs or branches surmounted by birds.		Ajagbusi. _______; Ilobu, Osun State. (Center)
Ọya	Ìyásàán; Àràká; Òrìrí	The third wife of the one time Oba of Oyo called Shango, she is also known to possess a fiery temper similar to Sango and is said to have entered into the River Niger. She is the deity of powerful winds, storms and the tempest, guardian of the cemetery, storms and transformation. She possesses the power to shape shift between human and animal forms and is closely associated with the African buffalo. She is also referred to as the Mother of Nine (Iya-esan) for the nine branches of the river. Due to her personal power and nature as a warrior goddess, she is usually depicted as being in the company of her husband Shango. She is the Orisha of rebirth.		Ìrá, Oyun, Kwara. (Home) _______; Okọ̀rọ̀, Àjàṣẹ́, Benin. (Iya Abessan temple)
Òsanyìn	Àrọ̀nì	Osanyin is the most powerful deity of herbs with dominion over all those who deal with plants and magic. Represented as a one eyed, one-handed, and one-legged figure, he is the Orisha of herbs, plants, magic, potions, charms and healing. Osanyin is often depicted as a homoeopathic Orisha, meaning that he often takes the look or form of the ailment which it is invoked to treat or cure. He also represents the duality and balance of nature and the double facets of herbal power; 'That which can make you better can also harm you if used improperly or if abused'. His object is the Osanyin staff, (Opa Osanyin). The staff is composed of a circle of small birds and a shaft in the middle that elevates a large bird above smaller ones.		Ìsaba, Ìkọ̀lé, Èkìtì state. (Home, Origin).
Ọbalúayé	Ṣọ̀pọ̀ná; Babalú Ayé; Ọmọlú; Olóde; Sapata	Meaning; "Lord/ruler of the earth" and a widely feared orisha, he is also known as Sopona, Omolu or Sapata, the Orisha of diseases and sickness. While he has the power to inflict smallpox, Leprosy, Tuberculosis and other communicable diseases, he is also associated with healing those afflicted. In the early 20th century (1917), Obaluaye in Nigeria was banned by the British colonial Government because its devotees were thought to deliberately spread smallpox. Later writers tended to disapprove of these earlier opinions/suggestions. Shoponna priests prevented the spread of contagious diseases by being responsible for the removal of corpses and belongings of those who died from them. Sopona priests seem to have known of the protective and dangerous nature of the virus and often inoculated people against the disease by skin incisions.		
Yewá	Yeruwa; Iyawa; Iyewa	Orisha of the Yewa River associated with cemeteries, clarity, beauty, dreams and magic. She lives in the cemetery with Oba and Oya. She brings souls to her sister Oya meaning she is the initiator of the beginning of all change that occurs. Explicit or loud speech near her places of worship is not tolerated. There is also a pataki of how this orisha was able to effectively trick death itself. Also, Yewa cannot be venerated near Shango as according to the patakis he molested her. Yewa is also responsible for gifting humans with dreams and imagination. Her name 'Iye wa' or 'Iya wa' translates to mean 'Our Mother.		Ado-Odo, Ogun State. (Associated)
Ọbàtálá	Òrìṣàlá; Òṣàlúfọ́n; Òṣàgìrìyan; Olúwa Ayé; Oṣẹ̀rẹ̀màgbó	Also known as Orisa-nla/Oshala, meaning "the big Orisha," and Orisha Funfun; The white Orisha. He is also known as the Skyfather. He is often equated with purity, and represented by "Ala," or white cloth, and "Ẹfun," white chalk. Most items associated with Obatala are either white or clear. He is regarded as the creator of Earth and the shaper of the human body from clay. He is also known as the protector of the physically challenged/different. His favourite consort was Yemowo (Yèyé Mowò). At his Ifon abode, he is known by the name Oshalufon, while in Ejigbo he goes by the appellation Oshagiyan/Oshagiriyan, two popular avatars of Obatala. His offerings are the African land snails (Ìgbín).		Òde Ìrànjé (Ìdẹ̀ta), Ifẹ̀. (Origin, Home) _______; Ifọ́n, Òṣun. (Associated) _______; Èjìgbò, Òṣun. (Associated)
Aganjù	Aganjùṣọlá	Roughly translating to "darkness of the wilderness," Aganju is very closely related to Sango and is regarded as the Orisha of the forest, the desert, volcanoes, and the wilderness. He was originally a king of the Oyo empire (See; Alaafin Aganju sola) before being deified after his death. He is the patron deity of long-distance travelling, is said to walk with a sword in long strides as if leaping over obstacles, and is said to fight by shooting fire, as opposed to Sango who fights with thunderbolts and lightning while hurling thunderstones (Ẹdun àrá). His object is a double axe similar to Sango's but with a longer handle.		Ọ̀yọ́ Ilé. (Home)
Ọ̀ṣọ́ọ̀sì	Ọ̀ṣọ́wùsì; Ọdẹ Mẹ́ta	He is the Orisha of adventure, hunting and the forest, and is another patron of hunters. He is a master of archery (He is called 'the archer of the Orisha') and is always depicted holding a bow and arrow often with a quiver, (Apó). His power is made manifest in the speed and accuracy of his arrow and his prideful assertion of mental and physical dexterity. His object is a brass iron crossbow (Ọrún) often with strings of cowries hanging down from it, and small iron cylinders filled with miniature arrows (Ọfà)		Ìdó.
Olókun	Malòkun; Ṣẹ̀níadé	A primordial force present at creation, Olokun, meaning "Owner of the ocean" is also known as Imalẹ̀ Òkun, "Deity of the Ocean". Olokun had been present since the beginning of creation as an androgynous Orisha ruling the depths of the ocean and all the waters on earth before Obatala was supposed to come and create dry land. They are the parent of the Orishas Ajé and Ọlọ́sà and represents wealth, healing, and the vastness of the sea.		Ilé Ifẹ̀, Ọ̀ṣun. (Origin, Home)
Ajé	Ṣàlùgá; Ògúgúlùso	Not to be confused with Iyami Aje, she is also called Ajé Ṣaluga. Ajé is the representation and the orisha of wealth and economic success. She is also a patron of traders, businesspeople, and markets. The Yoruba word for Monday, is called Ajé as it is often the first day of the week when markets open.		
Odùduwà	Ọlọ́fin Àdìmúlà; Ọṣìn Ọ̀rà; Ọlọ́fin Ayé	Regarded as the founder of the Yoruba people and the first Oba of Ife, he is also associated with an androgynous orisha of creation. Most Yoruba people, and their monarchs most especially, claim descent from Oduduwa. He is a father or grandfather of Oranmiyan, Sango, Ajaka, Obalufon, and other Obas of Ife. He is also regarded as an ancestor of the Obas of the Benin Empire. He is the Orisha of the Earth and the initiator of the Ogboni which started from the sacred city of Ife and are charged with the maintenance of social order.		Òkè Ọ̀rà. (Origin, Home) _______ Ilé Ifẹ̀. (Home)
Ọbà	Ibu	The first and most senior wife of Shango, she is the Orisha of the Oba River, and also is the Orisha of domesticity, energy, movement, and the flow of time and life. She is most known for being tricked by the other wives of Shango into cutting off her ear and attempting to feed it to her husband Shango. As a part of the female trio associated with Shango, she is associated with the wild clouds that comes with every storm.		
