= Orisha =

Divine beings in the Yoruba religion and its derivatives in the African diaspora

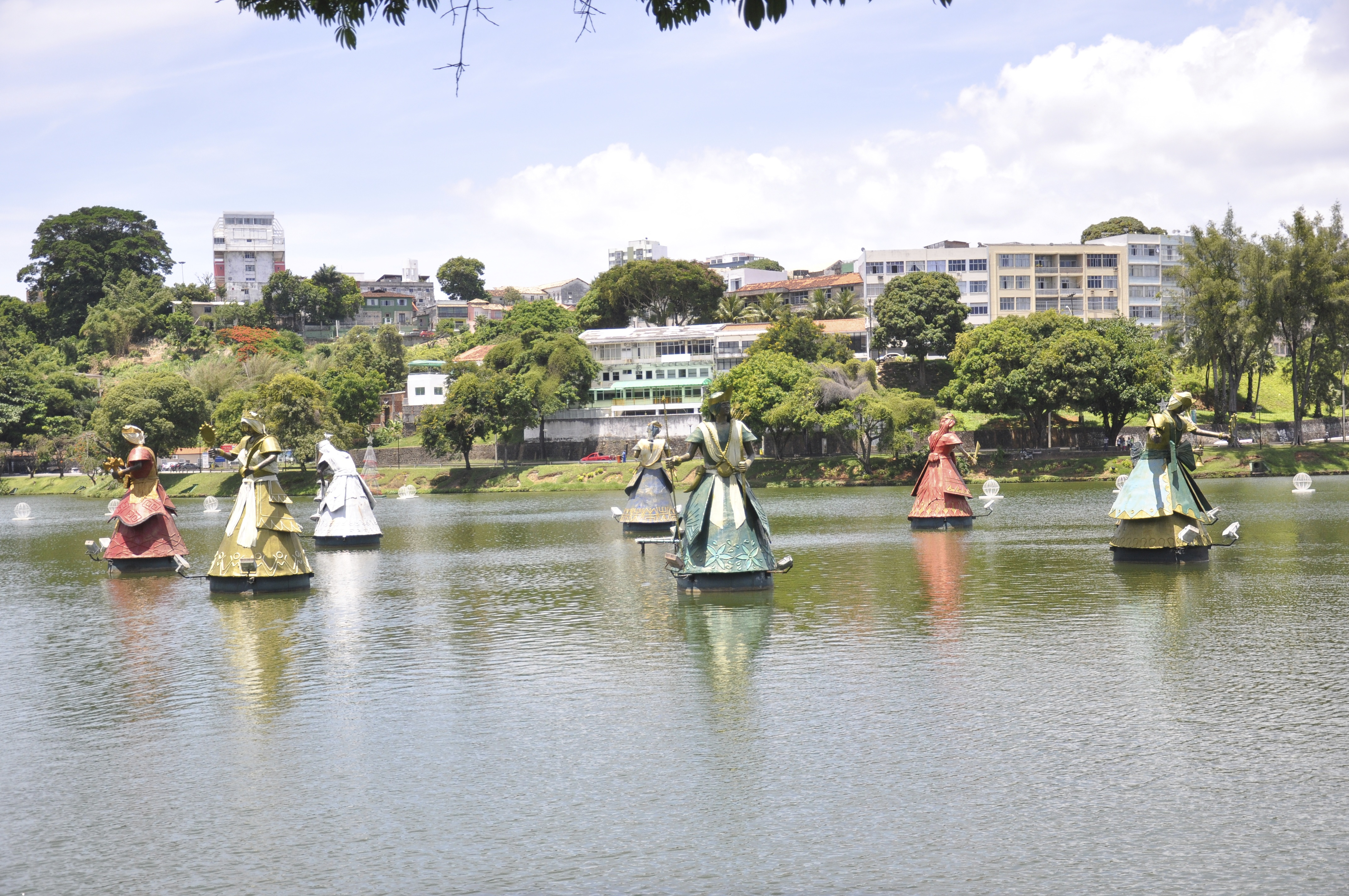
Statues of Orishas in the water at Dique do Tororó Park, Salvador, Bahia, Brazil

Orishas (singular: orisha; plural may also be orisha) are divine spirits that play a key role in the Yoruba religion of West Africa and several religions of the African diaspora that derive from it, such as Haitian Vodou, Cuban Santería, and Brazilian Candomblé. The preferred spelling varies depending on the language in question: òrìṣà is the spelling in the Yoruba language (both singular and plural), orixá in Portuguese, and orisha, oricha, orichá or orixá in Spanish-speaking countries. In the Lucumí tradition, which evolved in Cuba, the orishas are syncretized with Catholic saints, forming a syncretic system of worship where Yoruba deities were hidden behind Christian iconography. This allowed enslaved Africans to preserve their traditions under colonial religious persecution.

According to the teachings of these religions, the orishas are spirits sent by the supreme creator, Olodumare, to assist humanity and to teach them to be successful on Ayé (Earth). Rooted in the native religion of the Yoruba people, most orishas are said to have previously existed in Ọ̀run (the spirit realm) and then incarnated as humans on Earth. These orishas are called Irúnmọlẹ̀. The Irunmọlẹ took upon human identities and lived as ordinary humans in the physical world, but because they had their origin in the divine, they had great wisdom and power at the moment of their creation.

The orishas found their way to most of the New World as a result of the Atlantic slave trade and are now expressed in practices as varied as Haitian Vodou, Santería, Candomblé, Trinidad Orisha, Umbanda and Quimbanda, among others. The concept of òrìṣà is similar to those of deities in the traditional religions of the Bini people of Edo State in southern Nigeria, the Ewe people of Benin, Ghana, and Togo, and the Fon people of Benin.

In diasporic communities, the worship of orishas often incorporates drumming, dance, and spirit possession as central aspects of ritual life. These practices serve to strengthen communal bonds and foster direct spiritual experiences among practitioners.

== Number ==
Yoruba tradition often holds that there are 400 + 1 orishas, which is associated with a sacred number. Other sources suggest that the number is "as many as you can think of, plus one more – an innumerable number". Different oral traditions refer to 400, 700, or 1,440 orishas. This symbolic numbering system reflects the complexity and vastness of the spiritual world in Yoruba cosmology. The phrase "400 + 1" represents the idea that the divine world cannot be fully quantified or comprehended by human minds.

== Beliefs ==
=== Orí ===
Practitioners traditionally believe that daily life depends on proper alignment and knowledge of one's Orí. Ori literally means the head, but in spiritual matters, it is taken to mean a portion of the soul that determines personal destiny.

Offerings, prayers, and self-reflection are all means by which a devotee can align with their Orí, thereby ensuring balance, success, and fulfilment in life. Without proper alignment with one's Orí, even the assistance of the orishas may prove ineffective.

=== Deification ===
Some orishas are rooted in ancestor worship; warriors, kings, and founders of cities were celebrated after death and joined the pantheon of Yoruba deities. The ancestors did not die but were seen to have "disappeared" and become orishas. Some orishas based on historical figures are confined to worship in their families or towns of origin; others are venerated across wider geographic areas.

=== Aṣẹ ===
Aṣẹ is the life-force that runs through all things, living and inanimate, and is described as the power to make things happen. It is an affirmation that is used in greetings and prayers, as well as a concept of spiritual growth. Orìṣà devotees strive to obtain Aṣẹ through iwa pẹlẹ, gentle and good character, and in turn they experience alignment with the ori, what others might call inner peace and satisfaction with life. Aṣẹ is divine energy that comes from Olodumare, the creator deity. For practitioners, aṣẹ represents a link to the eternal presence of the supreme deity, the orishas, and the ancestors. Rituals, prayers, songs, and sacrifices are all ways to invoke or transfer ase. In this way, every action and word becomes potentially sacred, carrying spiritual weight and consequence.

The concept is regularly referenced in Brazilian capoeira. Axé in this context is used as a greeting or farewell, in songs and as a form of praise. Saying that someone "has axé" in capoeira is complimenting their energy, fighting spirit, and attitude.

== Pantheon ==
The orisa are grouped as those represented by the color white, who are characterized as tutu "cool, calm, gentle, and temperate"; and those represented by the colors red or black, who are characterized as gbigbona "bold, strong, assertive, and easily annoyed". Like humans, orishas may have a preferred color, food, or object. The traits of the orishas are documented through oral tradition.

Each orisha governs specific aspects of nature and human experience—for example, Ogun governs iron and war; Ọ̀ṣun, Yemọja, Yewa, Ọ̀tìn, Erinlẹ̀, Ọbà and many more are river deities; while Olókun owns the ocean. Their symbols, offerings, and ritual practices are carefully preserved and transmitted through generations of initiates.

== Orisha worship in Brazil ==
=== Historical context and development ===
While the Orisha exist across various Afro-Diasporic spaces, such as Brazil, Cuba, and Haiti, there are specific elements within Afro-Brazilian belief and worship practices. Historical context is important to understand these practices as well as potential differences compared to other depictions of the Orisha. The development of Afro-Brazilian worship of Orisha ties with historical events involving relocation, adaptation, and survival of religious spaces.

Orishas are divine spirits worshipped in the Candomblé religion, a cosmology introduced and practiced by enslaved and freed Yoruba peoples in various places, including Brazil, Cuba, and Haiti. Accounts describe the establishment of Candomblé around 1830 by three freed African women: Iyá Dêtá, Iyá Kalá, and Iyá Nassô. Like other worshippers, these women preserved their religious practices and created a space of worship that spread across Brazil. Other founders would study in Nigeria to transfer the knowledge of Candomblé back to Brazil. However, slaveholders historically promoted Christianity over Africans' own religions, forcing them toward more 'civilized' beliefs. Even then, enslaved Africans struggled to assimilate and access the imposed religion of their captors. Given Africans' lack of access to the European religious order, the houses of African worship functioned as syncretic and religious resistance to the dominant class. This involved conscious deception of religious worship, especially in the presence of European pressures that discouraged African religions. Africans would disguise their Orishas with Christian saints, making the worship appear as following the European norm. The Africans would also depict the saints as darker-skinned, representing themselves within Christianity while containing their deceptive practices. Additionally, they would attend mass, which many continue to do in Brazil as Candomblé worshippers. The religion's social structure, complexity, and portability appealed to waves of Africans in the African Slave Trade as the cosmology did not tie to objects compared to other religious groups. While worshippers believed the Orisha reside in Yorubaland, displacement of Africans to places like Brazil meant a change of Orishas' inhabitance across different spaces. Specifically, this meant a shift toward portable Orishas that allowed greater access, such as different bodies of water. Through adaptation and perseverance, Africans continued their religion in unfamiliar spaces like Brazil, providing the means for survival of their spiritualities.

=== Brazilian Orisha cosmology ===
The Orisha were believed to have lived during the Earth's creation before they turned into stone. The Orisha's children then kept the ceremonies and practices alive, which allowed the survival of their knowledge and religious inheritance. Scholars estimate at least four hundred Orisha, which provide worshippers with guidance throughout their lives and religious journeys. The total Orisha count may vary when historical and syncretic factors are taken into account, especially with the worship of Orishas and saints. Additionally, different casas hold criticisms about each other regarding their practice authenticity compared to African religions. Even today, there are debates and movements about the authenticity of Orisha worship, which shapes the relationships across different casas and their practices. However, the scholars note a few similarities across branches of Candomblé, specifically in the Orisha. They are said to be part of nature, including water, air, forest, and the earth. Each Orisha holds a role or strength that resonates with natural elements given their relationships with Earth. Within those categories, there are important dichotomies of Orisha descriptions: hot/cold, fire/water, earth/water, fire/sky, and masculine/feminine. Based on their identity, the Orishá are labeled with specific temperaments and physical attributes. This allows for the ranking and role of the deities, creating a hierarchy that worshippers recognize and respect. However, unlike Christianity, there are Orishás depicted as half-male and half-female, which may change their personalities and roles. Orishás hold their own likes and dislikes, such as sacred food, time of worship, iconography, location, offerings, and other specific depictions of themselves that differentiate from other Orisha. Food offerings are usually left out for one to three days, which scholars suggest to be the Orisha eating before worshippers remove it from the terreiro. In this cosmology, Oxalá is considered the father of all the Orisha, which inhabit his land. In relation to Christianity, Oxalá was depicted as Jesus Christ along with other saints and Orisha.

There is also an emphasis on kinship and social belonging, which devotees practice throughout their religious practices. This provides a space for connection and an opportunity to offer items to their Orishas. Worship usually occurs in casas or terreiros, either owned by a pai de santo (head priest) or mãe de santo (high priestess), which women usually hold leadership roles, terreiros, and spaces of worship. However, both genders can generally become religious leaders. Additionally, seniority is an indicator of one's role in worship and leadership.Terreiros are spaces where the axé (sacred energy), which appears within a child's body. Worshippers are usually observed going into a trance state, which is believed to be the Orisha taking over or "mounting" their bodies, especially during Candomblé rituals where people are said to feel the spiritual energy within and around themselves. This is described as a possession of the initiate's body. During initiations, people describe three different scenarios of Orishas taking over people's bodies: passando mal, inheritance of Orisha, and individuals choosing to practice Candomblé later on. Passando mal usually implies an individual or their families experiencing bad luck, which is exhibited physically, psychologically, or outwardly. Familial inheritance implies that the Orisha are passed down across generations of Candomblé worshippers. For infants, Orisha inheritance allows receiving their own at a young age rather than waiting. Similarly, those holding a strong African heritage, identity, or religion can experience this as well. Lastly, initiation may be a choice of the individual, even if they did not have previous experience in Candomblé. A person's Orisha is meant to guide and protect them throughout their lives. Scholars report people feeling a deeper connection to a terreiro, reinforcing their connections to the religion and their Orisha's, which is important to continue participating in that religion's spaces. Individuals connect to their Orisha through celebrations with the high priestess, Aboxa (family celebrant), and adjé (community priest). Each Candomblé temple pays their respects to the deities, providing a concentrated space of worship. However, people also worship them individually as each is believed to hold their own strengths, powers, and personalities.

=== Syncretic elements ===
With a push toward Africans adopting the Catholic faith, Candomblé cultural practices and beliefs were at risk of loss. The Yoruba used aspects of Catholicism and Candomblé, such as the worship of the Christian God and saints, to hide their true religious practices in plain sight. They did this through ceremonies, saint name substitutions, and the appearance of Catholic conversion. There are instances of terreiros requiring Catholic baptisms, attending mass, and other forms of worship to practice Candomblé. In contemporary times, many Candomblé worshippers consider themselves Catholic, even as they continue worshipping Orishas. Scholars point toward the syncretic history of the Orisha and Christianity under colonial control, which is reflected in contemporary practice and interpretations.

Syncretized Saints
Candomblé Name	Christianity Name
Iemanja	Virgin Mary
Exu	Satan
Oxalá	Jesus Christ
Xangô	Saint Peter
Ogun	Saint Anthony
Yansan	Saint Barbara

=== De-syncretization and decolonization movements ===
- International Congress of Orisha Tradition and Culture (COMTOC)

In 1983, the second COMTOC was held in Salvador where petitions pushed the end of Afro-Catholicism and its role in syncretizing African religions. Scholars mention the need for worshippers wanting the connection to be toward Africa rather than slavery, where the syncretization was necessary for religious survival.

- Back to the Roots

While syncretic aspects of Western and African religions persevered over time, scholars have noted movements towards de-syncretization and re-Africanization. One of these movements is called "Back to the Roots", which appeared in the 70s with the goal of bringing the authentic and true African religion back.

=== Our Lady of Navigators ===
This usually takes place in Bahia on February 2 for Iemanjá, the Orisha of the sea. Worshippers wear blue and white clothing along with offerings for her. While scholars are unsure when this festival started, they infer after 1888 after the abolition of slavery in Brazil, which may have allowed them to express their Orisha worship publicly. A similar celebration occurs in Rio de Janeiro in December with similar offerings and iconography processions.

== List of Orisha ==
Name	Deity Of	Ethnic Group	Religion	Homeland
Agemo	Chameleons	Yoruba People	Yoruba Religion	Yorubaland
Aganju	Volcanoes, The Wilderness, Deserts, Fire	Yoruba People	Yoruba Religion	Yorubaland
Ajaka	Peace, Love, Equality	Yoruba People	Yoruba Religion	Yorubaland
Ayangalu	Drummers, Gángan, Drums	Yoruba People	Yoruba Religion	Yorubaland
Ara Ara	The Weather, Storms, Thunder	Yoruba People	Yoruba Religion	Yorubaland
Ayelala	Punishes Crime	Yoruba People (Part)	Yoruba Religion (Part)	Yorubaland (Part)
Aroni	The Beauty Of Nature, Spirit Of The Forest, Herbs, Plants, Trees	Yoruba People	Yoruba Religion	Yorubaland
Alaafia	Peace, Humility, Patience	Yoruba People	Yoruba Religion	Yorubaland
Aje	Wealth, Property, Prosperity, Fortune, Success	Yoruba People	Yoruba Religion	Yorubaland
Ayé	Passion, Environmentalism, Nature	Yoruba People	Yoruba Religion	Yorubaland
Aja	Wild, Herbs, Plants, Leave, Wildlife	Yoruba People	Yoruba Religion	Yorubaland
Biri	Darkness, Night, Midnight	Yoruba People	Yoruba Religion	Yorubaland
Babalu Aye	Smallpox, Epidemic Diseases, Healing	Yoruba People	Yoruba Religion	Yorubaland
Bayanni (Dada)	Children, Dreadheads, Prosperity, Vegetables	Yoruba People	Yoruba Religion	Yorubaland
Ela	Manifestation & Light & Passion For Charity & Giving	Yoruba People	Yoruba Religion	Yorubaland
Erinle	Hunters, Earth, Natural Force Of Universe, Fishing, The Hunt	Yoruba People	Yoruba Religion	Yorubaland
Eshu	Trickery, The Crossroads, Misfortune, Chaos, Death, Travelers, Messenger	Yoruba People	Yoruba Religion	Yorubaland
Ibeji	Twins	Yoruba People	Yoruba Religion	Yorubaland
Iroko	Tree, Wilderness	Yoruba People	Yoruba Religion	Yorubaland
Iya Nla	Primordial Spirit	Yoruba People	Yoruba Religion	Yorubaland
Imole	Sunlight, Soothsayer	Yoruba People	Yoruba Religion	Yorubaland
Logun Edé	War & Hunting	Yoruba People	Yoruba Religion	Yorubaland
Moremi	Saviour	Yoruba People	Yoruba Religion	Yorubaland
Oba	Rivers, homemaking, domestic policies	Yoruba People	Yoruba Religion	Yorubaland
Obatala	Creation	Yoruba People	Yoruba Religion	Yorubaland
Oduduwa	Progenitor, Warrior	Yoruba People	Yoruba Religion	Yorubaland
Ogun	Warriors, Soldiers, Blacksmiths, Metal Workers, Craftsmen	Yoruba People	Yoruba Religion	Yorubaland
Oke	Mountain, Hill	Yoruba People	Yoruba Religion	Yorubaland
Oko	Agriculture, Farming, Fertility	Yoruba People	Yoruba Religion	Yorubaland
Olokun	Water, Health, Wealth	Yoruba People	Yoruba Religion	Yorubaland
Olumo	Mountain	Yoruba People	Yoruba Religion	Yorubaland
Ọranyan	Progenitor	Yoruba People	Yoruba Religion	Yorubaland
Orò	Justice, Bullroarers	Yoruba People	Yoruba Religion	Yorubaland
Oronsen	Progenitor	Yoruba People	Yoruba Religion	Yorubaland
Ọrunmila	Wisdom, Knowledge, Ifa Divination, Philosophy, Fate, Destiny, Prophecy, Babalawo	Yoruba People	Yoruba Religion	Yorubaland
Ori	Beforelife, Afterlife, Destiny, Personal Identity	Yoruba People	Yoruba Religion	Yorubaland
Osanyin	Herb, Plant, Nature, Herbalist, Magician	Yoruba People	Yoruba Religion	Yorubaland
Oshosi	Hunt, Forest, Warrior, Justice	Yoruba People	Yoruba Religion	Yorubaland
Oshun	Goddess of Water, Purity, Fertility, Love, Sensuality, Femininity, Beauty	Yoruba People	Yoruba Religion	Yorubaland
Oshunmare	Rainbow, Serpent, Regeneration, Rebirth	Yoruba People	Yoruba Religion	Yorubaland
Otin	River, Fighter	Yoruba People	Yoruba Religion	Yorubaland
Ọya	Storms, Wind, Thunder, Lightning, Dead	Yoruba People	Yoruba Religion	Yorubaland
Shango	Thunder, Lightning, Fire, Justice, Dance, Virility	Yoruba People	Yoruba Religion	Yorubaland
Yemoja	Water, Moon, The Motherhood, Protection, Nurturing	Yoruba People	Yoruba Religion	Yorubaland
Yemowo	Creation, Sea, Water	Yoruba People	Yoruba Religion	Yorubaland
Yewá	Yewa River	Yoruba People	Yoruba Religion	Yorubaland

== See also ==
- Ajogun
- Alusi, the Igbo pantheon.
- Kami, similar concept in Shinto religion.
- List of Yoruba deities
- Loa
- Nkisi
- West African mythology
- Winti
- Yoruba religion
