= Yoruba calendar =

Calendar used by the Yoruba people

The Yoruba calendar (Yoruba: Kọ́jọ́dá or Kojoda) is a calendar used by the Yoruba people of southwestern and north central Nigeria and southern Benin. The calendar has a year beginning on the last moon of May or first moon of June of the Gregorian calendar. The new year coincides with the Ifá festival.

The traditional Yoruba week has four days. The four days that are dedicated to the Orisha (Òrìṣà) and other supernatural beings go as follow:

- Day 1 is dedicated to Obatala, Ṣọpọna, Iyami Aje, and the Egungun
- Day 2 is dedicated to Orunmila, Esu, and Osun
- Day 3 is dedicated to Ogun and Oshosi
- Day 4 is dedicated to Sango and Oya

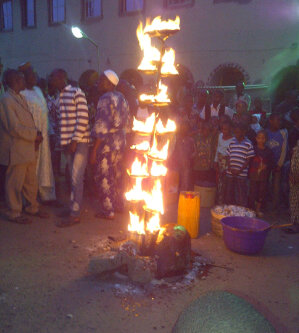
The sacred lamp lit at the beginning of the annual Osun-Osogbo festival, which takes place in Oṣu Ogun (August)

Beier (1959) notes that:

"It is the priests of the Orisa Oko (the farm god) who are responsible for keeping the 'calendar' and the fixing of festival dates is usually done in consultation with them. The priests of Orisa Oko keep count of the months by sacrificing a pigeon at every new moon abd keeping the head of the pigeon in a special calabash."

To reconcile with the Gregorian calendar, Yoruba people also measure time in seven days a week and four weeks a month. The four-day calendar was dedicated to the Orishas and the seven-day calendar is for doing business.

The seven days are: Ọjọ́-Àìkú (Sunday), Ọjọ́-Ajé (Monday), O̩jọ́-Ìṣẹ́gun (Tuesday), Ọjọ́rú (Wednesday), Ọjọ́bo̩ (Thursday), Ọjọ́-E̩tì (Friday) and O̩jọ́-Àbamé̩ta (Saturday).

Time (Ìgbà, àsìkò, àkókò) is measured in ìṣẹ́jú-àáyá (seconds), ìṣẹ́jú (minutes), wákàtì (hours), ọjọ́ (days), ọ̀sẹ̀ (weeks), oṣù (months) and ọdún (years).

There are 60 seconds (ọgọ́ta ìṣẹ́jú-àáyá) in 1 minute (ìṣẹ́jú kan); 60 minutes (ọgọ́ta ìṣẹ́jú) in 1 hour (wákàtì kan); 24 hours (wákàtì mẹ́rìnlélógún) in 1 day (ọjọ́ kan); 7 days (ọjọ́ méje) in 1 week (ọ̀sẹ̀ kan); 4 or 5 weeks (ọ̀sẹ̀ mẹ́rìn tàbí márùn-ún) in one month (oṣù kan); 52 weeks (ọ̀sẹ̀ méjìléláàádọ́ta), 12 months (oṣù méjìlá), and 365 days (ọjọ́ mẹ́rìndínláàádọ́rinlélọ́ọ̀ọ́dúnrún) in 1 year (ọdún kan).

== Calendar examples ==
The Yoruba traditional calendar is called “KỌ́JỌ́DÁ” 'Kí ọjọ́ dá,' meaning: may the day be clearly foreseen.

KỌ́JỌ́DÁ 10053(2053CE)/ CALENDAR 2011-2012
ÒKÙDÚ 10053(2053CE) / June 2011
Ọsẹ̀	91st	1st	2nd	3rd	4th	5th	6th	7th	8th
Ọjọ́-Ṣàngọ́/Jàkúta		2	6	10	14	18	22	26	30
Ọjọ́-Ọ̀rúnmìlà/Ifá		3	7	11	15	19	23	27	
Ọjọ́-Ògún		4	8	12	16	20	24	28	
Ọjọ́-Ọbàtálá	1	5	9	13	17	21	25	29	

The traditional Yoruba calendar (Kọ́jọ́dá) has a 4-day week, 7-week month and 13 months in a year. The 91 weeks in a year added up to 364 days. The Yoruba year spans from 3 June of a Gregorian calendar year to 2 June of the following year. According to the calendar developed by Remi-Niyi Alaran, the Gregorian year 2026 AD is the 10,068th year of Yoruba records of time. With the British colonial and European cultural invasions, came the need to reconcile with the Gregorian calendar: Yoruba people also measure time in seven days a week and 52 weeks a year.

== Calendar terminologies ==
ỌSẸ̀ (Ọjọ́ ỌSẸ̀- Days of the Week) in Yoruba calendar	Day in Gregorian calendar
Ọjọ́-Àìkú (Day of Immortality)	Sunday
Ọjọ́-Ajé (Day of Wealth/Money)	Monday
Ọjọ́-Ìṣégun (Day of Victory)	Tuesday
Ọjọ́rú (Day of Confusion & Disruption)	Wednesday
Ọjọ́bọ̀ (Day of Rituals)	Thursday
Ọjọ́-Ẹtì (Day of Postponement & Delay)	Friday
Ọjọ́-Àbámẹ́ta (Day of the Three Suggestions)	Saturday

Oṣù in Yoruba calendar	Months in Gregorian calendar
Òkúdù	June
Agẹmọ (Month of the Agemo festival of the Ijebus)	July
Ògún (Month of the òrìṣà Ògún and Ogun festivals)	August
Ọwẹ́wẹ̀ or Owewe	September
Ọ̀wàrà or Ọ̀wààrà (Month of the many Rain Showers)	October
Bélú	November
Ọ̀pẹ (Month of the Palm Tree)	December
Ṣẹrẹ	January
Èrèlé (Month of Blessings of the Home)	February
Ẹrẹ́nà	March
Igbe (Month of Proclamation)	April
Ẹ̀bìbì (Month of the Ẹ̀bìbì festival of the Ìjẹ̀bú)	May

== Worship of the Òrìṣà in specific months ==
=== Ṣẹrẹ (January) ===
- Dedicated to Obatala.

=== Èrèlé (February) ===
- Dedicated to Olóòkun (Òrìṣà of òkun, the deep seas or oceans), patron of sailors, and guardian of souls lost at sea.

February 21–25

=== Ẹrẹ́nà (March) ===
- Annual rites of passage for men

March 12–28

- Dedicated to Oduduwa "Iyaagbe," Òrìṣà of Earth and matron of the Ayé (the world), father of the Yoruba people

March 15–19

- Also dedicated to Ọ̀ṣọ́ọ̀sì (Òrìṣà of Adventure and the hunt).

March 21–24:

=== Igbe (April) ===
- Onset of rainy season

=== Èbìbí (May) ===
- Dedicated to Egúngún (Commemoration of the Ancestors, including community founders and illustrious dead).

=== Òkúdù (June) ===
- June 3: Onset of the Yoruba New Year (2026 is the 10,068th year of Yoruba culture). Ọrúnmilà / Ifá = Òrìṣà of Divination and custodian of the Ifá. It includes a Mass gathering of the Yoruba in the city of Ife, regarded as the center of creation.
- Sopona – Òrìṣà of Disease and smallpox, also known as Obaluaye. Ṣọ̀pọ̀na is also the word for smallpox disease.
- Ọ̀sanyìn – Òrìṣà of Plants, magic, Medicine, and patron of the healing professions
- Òkúdù 10–23: Annual rites of passage for women
- Òkúdù 18–21: Yemoja = mother of the Òrìṣà, Òrìṣà of fertility, women, and water).

=== Agẹmo (July) ===
- Agẹmo: first and second weeks in July
- Oko (Agriculture) – Harvests & worship of the Òrìṣà of Farming Oko
- Dedicated to Èṣù "Ẹlégba" – one who has power to seize. He is the great Communicator and Messenger of the will of Olódùmarè.
- Dedicated to Ṣàngó "Jakuta" – the Òrìṣà of Energy, àrá (Thunder), and Mànàmáná/Mọ̀nàmọ́ná (lightning)

=== Ògún (August) ===
- The annual Ọ̀ṣun-Òṣogbo festival occurs in August
- Dedicated to Ọ̀ṣun – Òrìṣà of Fertility and custodian of the female essence who guides pregnancies to term.
- Dedicated to Ogun – Òrìṣà of iron/metals (i.e. a smith), war crafts, hunting, technology and engineering. The custodian of truth and executioner of justice, as such patron of the legal and counselling professions who must swear to uphold truth while biting on a piece of metal. (last weekend of August)

=== Ọwẹ́wẹ̀ (September) ===
- It is the month in which festivals such as New Yam Festivals, are being celebrated and it is a month of blessing. It celebrates the richness of Yoruba culture.
- September 8th the day of mama oshun

=== Ọ̀wàrà/Ọ̀wààrà (October) ===
- Ọ̀wàrà refers to the intense rain showers that occur during the month
- Dedicated to Oya (Òrìṣà of the river Niger whose is the guardian of gateway between the physical realm (Aye) and the spiritual realm (Òrún).
- Also dedicated to Ṣìgìdì – Òrìṣà of nightmares.
- Also the onset of the dry season

=== Ọ̀pẹ (December) ===
- Dedicated to Ọbalúayé (Òrìṣà of disease & healing).
- Onset of the Harmattan Season – "Ọyẹ́"
