= Osanyin staff =

An Osanyin staff

The Osanyin staff (Yoruba: Ọ̀pá Ọ̀sanyìn) is an object, a type of 'medicine staff' used by Yoruba herbalists and priests who enlist the aid of Osanyin, the deity of herbal medicines, in their work against different sorts of illness caused by malevolent forces. It is closely related to the Osun staff (Ọ̀pá Òsùn / Ọ̀pá Ọ̀rẹ̀rẹ̀) in structure and function.

The Yoruba believe the power of Osanyin is vested in the wrought iron staff staff, that is usually placed upright on altars to this Orisha. It is the direct precursor to the Asen staff used in the religious traditions of the Fon and other Gbe-speaking peoples to the southwest of Yorubaland, where the associated Osanyin is known as Age (Ague), and the form, name and meanings of the Osun staff have likewise been borrowed and incorporated as Asen.

== Description ==
The staff is composed of a circle of small birds and a shaft in the middle that elevates a large bird above smaller ones. Babatunde Lawal suggests that the reason for this division could be to suggest the relaying of metaphysical powers from the celestial to the terrestrial realm. Lawal evokes the Yoruba reference to Osanyin as "The one who sees everything, like Olodumare," allowing him a vantage point from which he can protect all of humanity below.

According to a quote of the Odu Ifa, there are sixteen different styles of the wrought iron staff of Osanyin. One kind carries only one bird at its summit; another, two; yet another, three; and so forth — until the staff that carries sixteen birds is reached. The last is the most prestigious.

Osanyin staff images

Osanyin staff

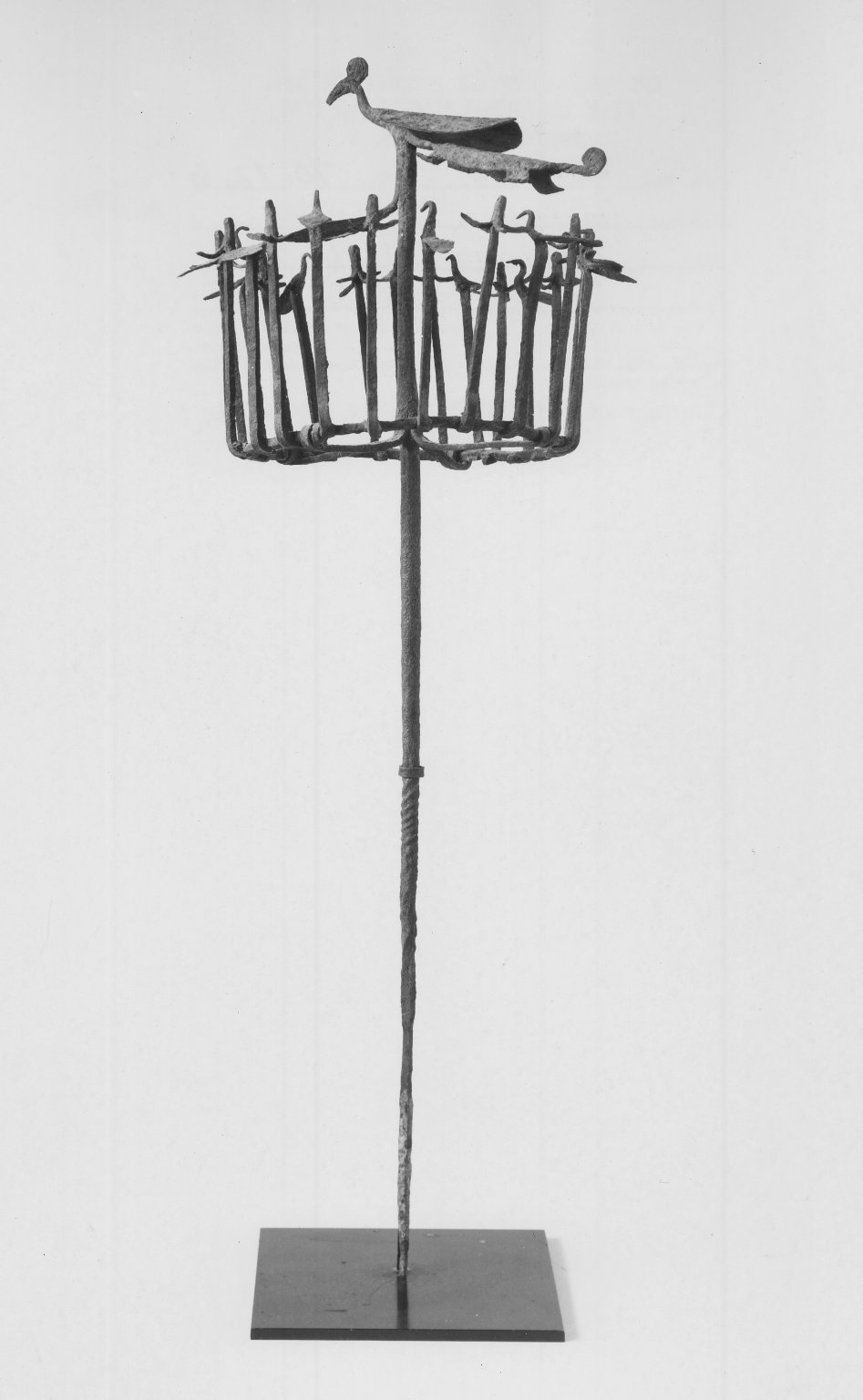
Staff topped by birds

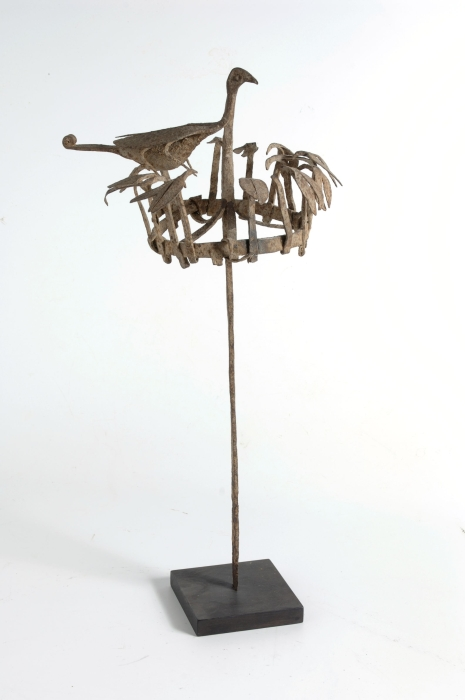
Osanyin staff

Opa Osanyin

The birds, emissaries of Ogun, refer to the herbalist's understanding of and power over these malevolent people. There are typically sixteen birds, invoking the most sacred number of divination, surrounding and confronting the central bird, which represents the smallpox god, Babalu Ayé.

The birds on Osanyin staffs suggest an iconographic link with the birds on Obas' crowns.
