= Letra del año =

The letra del año (Spanish) or letra do ano (Portuguese) (English: "letter of the year") is an annual proclamation of predictions and advice by babalawos for the coming year, usually issued every December 31 (New Year's Eve on the Gregorian calendar). In Yorubaland, it is issued by a council of babalawos during the Odun Ifá Festival in June (New Year according to the Yoruba calendar). In most of Latin America, a national council of babalawos is usually responsible for the announcements of predictions. In Cuba, however, at least two national councils (one of which is state-sponsored) offer letras del año. A particular controversy arose in 2009–2010, when one of the Cuban national councils of babalawo issued a letra which predicted fights for power and an unusually high number of deaths of political leaders in the world, which many media outlets outside Cuba interpreted as being directed to Cuba's own political apparatus.

== Some well known babalawo councils ==
=== Cuba ===
- Cuban Council of Great Priests of Ifá
- Miguel Febles Padrón Commission Organized for the Reading of the Year

=== United States ===
- Tata Gaitan Commission Organized for the Reading of the Year
- Council of Babalawos of California

=== Puerto Rico ===
- Temple Yoruba Omó Orisha
- Yoruba Afro-Caribbean Orisha Ayé Association

=== Venezuela ===
- Civil Cultural Association of Priests of Ifá

=== Panama ===
- Ilé Ifá Ifá Lola Alfonso Díaz
- Ilé Ifá Gerardo Carrillo

=== Mexico ===
- Yoruba Society of Mexico

=== Spain ===
- Ilé Iré Esulona

=== Brazil ===
- Associação Ifá Ni L'Órun

=== France ===
- Yoruba Cultural Association of Cuba in France
