= Babalú-Ayé =

Deity of healing and disease in the Yoruba religion

- Healing and disease
- Member of Orisha
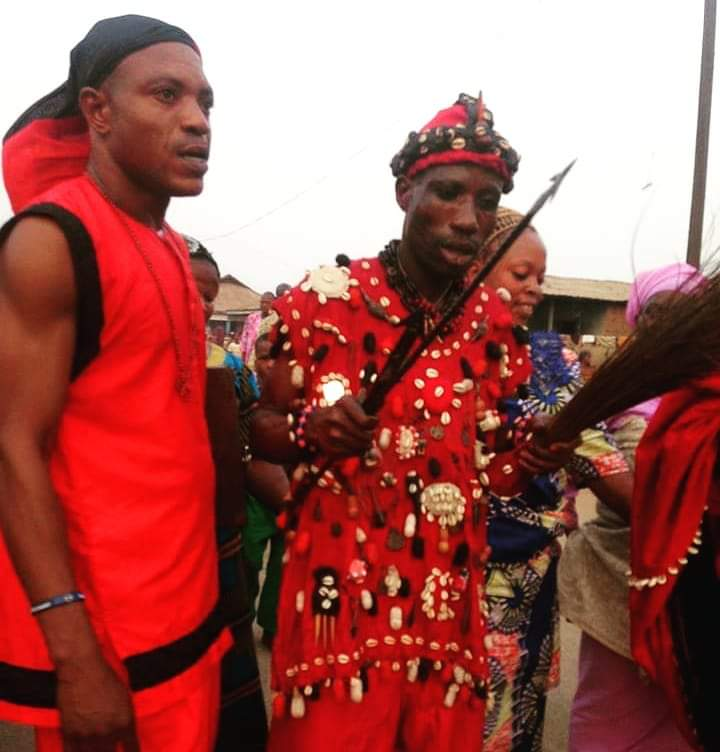
- Babalu-Ayé manifested in a human at the Obaluaye Festival in Ibadan, Oyo State, Nigeria.
- Other names: Ọbaluaye or Sopona
- Venerated in: Yoruba religion, Candomble, Santeria, Haitian Vodou, Folk Catholicism
- Day: The first day of the Kọjọda week
- Region: Nigeria, Benin, Latin America
- Ethnic group: Yoruba

Babalú-Aye (from Yoruba Obalúayé; also called Oluaye, Omolu, Ṣọpọna, Ayé in Trinidad Orisha, or Obaluaiye) is one of the Oriṣa or manifestations of the Supreme Deity Olodumare in the Yoruba religion of West Africa. Babalú-Aye is a spirit of the Earth and is strongly associated with healing and illness.

He promotes the cure for illnesses. He is always close to Iku (the force responsible for taking life), as he promotes healing for those who are close to death. However, some fear Obaluaye because he is believed to bring disease upon humans, including smallpox, for which he is known as Ṣọpọna.

His cult powers and spells are used against all kinds of diseases, but particularly against skin diseases, inflammation, and airborne diseases that can cause epidemics. They are also used to cure people with seizure problems, epilepsy, and catalepsy.

Heat is also a property of Babalu-Ayé. Fever, the body heating up to expel a disease, is believed to be Babalu-Ayé acting on the human body, as well as the heat that comes from the depths of the earth. Therefore, any kind of sacrifice or offering to this oriṣa must be done during the day, when the temperature is higher. Usually considered hobbled by disease, he universally takes grains as offerings.

== In Africa ==
=== Yoruba ===
Venerated by the Yoruba, O̩balúayé is usually called Sopona (Shopona) and is said to have dominion over the Earth and smallpox. He demands respect and even gratitude when he claims a victim, and so people sometimes honor him with the praise name Alápa-dúpé, meaning “One who kills and is thanked for it”. In one commonly recounted story, Ṣopona was old and lame. He attended a celebration at the palace of Obatala, the father of the orishas. When Ṣopona tried to dance, he stumbled and fell. All the other orishas laughed at him, and he in turn tried to infect them with smallpox. Obatala stopped him and drove him into the bush, where he has lived as an outcast ever since.

=== Fon ===
Venerated by the Fon, the spirit is most commonly called Sakpata. He owns the Earth and has strong associations with smallpox and other infections. His worship is very diverse in Fon communities, where many distinct manifestations of the spirit are venerated. Because the dead are buried in the Earth, the manifestation called Avimadye is considered the chief of the ancestors.

=== Ewe ===
Venerated by the Ewe, there is a similar figure with the praise name Anyigbato who is closely associated with sickness and displaced peoples. He is believed to wander the land at night, wearing a garment of rattling snail shells; the snail shells are also a key feature of his fetish.

== In Latin America ==
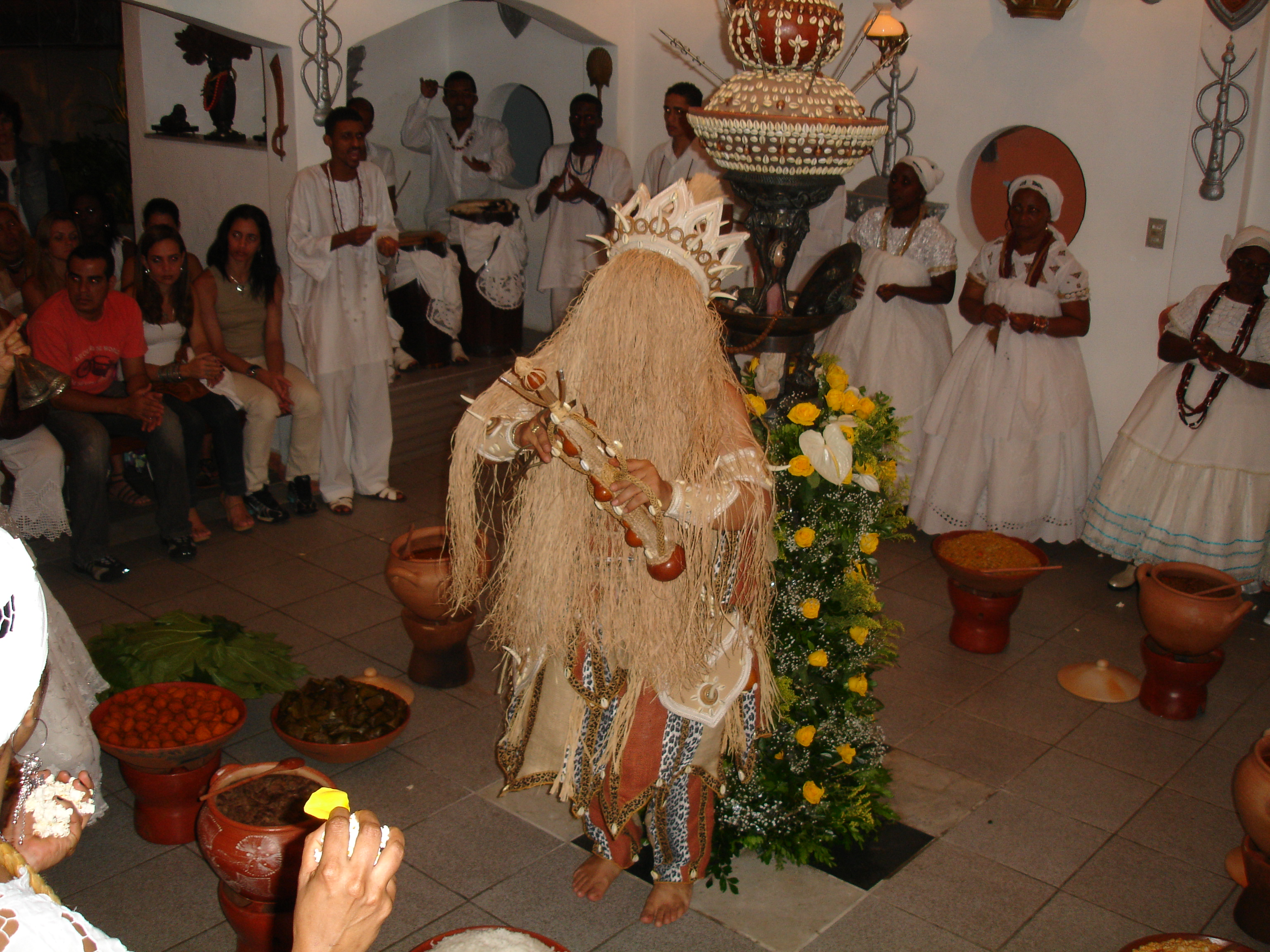
Omolu, in candomblé of "Ile Ase Ijino Ilu Orossi".

In Santería, Babalú-Ayé is among the most popular orishas. Syncretized with the Catholic saint Lazarus of Bethany, and regarded as particularly miraculous, Babalú-Ayé is publicly honored with a pilgrimage on December 17, when tens of thousands of devotees gather at the Leprosarium-Church of San Lázaro in El Rincón in the outskirts of Santiago de las Vegas, Havana. Arará believers in Cuba and its diaspora honor the spirit as Asojano. Both traditions use sackcloth in rituals to evoke his humility. The spirit also appears in Palo as Pata en Llaga.

In Candomblé, his face is so beautiful after his illness is cured that no one is worthy to look at him, that's why it is covered with palm straw. He also manifests in Umbanda and Macumba.

== In Ifá and Dilogun divination ==
Through divination, he often speaks to his devotees through the Ifá signs (Odu Ifá) Ojuani Meyi and Irete Meyi, though as a sickness, he can manifest in any divination sign. In cowrie-shell divination (Dilogun), he is also strongly associated with the sign called Metanlá (13 cowries).

== Relationship to other orisha ==
There are several, sometimes contradictory, accounts of Babalú-Ayé's genealogical relationships to other orisha. Babalú-Ayé is often considered the son of Yemoja and the brother of Shango. However, some religious lineages maintain that he is the son of Nana Buluku, while others assert that he is her husband.

Some lineages of Candomblé relate myths that justify Babalú-Ayé being the child of both Yemoja and Nana Burukú. In these myths, Nana Burukú is Babalú-Ayé's true mother who abandons him to die of exposure on the beach where he is badly scarred by crabs. Yemoja discovers him there, takes him under her protection, nurses him back to health, and educates him on many secrets.

Because of his knowledge of the forest and the healing power of plants, Babalú-Ayé is strongly associated with Osain, the orisha of herbs. Oba Ecun (an ornate in La Regla de Ocha) describes the two orisha as two aspects of a single being, while William Bascom noted that some connect the two through their mutual close relationship with the spirits of the forest called ijimere.

== Themes in the worship of Babalú ==
The narratives and rituals that carry important cultural information about Babalú-Ayé include various recurring and interrelated themes.

- Earth: Babalú-Ayé’s worship is frequently linked to the Earth itself, and even his name identifies him with the Earth itself.
- Illness and suffering: Long referred to as the “god of smallpox,” Babalú-Ayé certainly links back to disease in the body and the changes it brings. Because Babalú-Ayé both punishes people with illness and rewards them with health, his stories and ceremonies often deal with the body as a central locus of experience for both human limitations and divine power. Similarly, his mythical lameness evokes the idea of living in a constant state of limitation and physical pain, while people appeal to him to protect them from disease.
- The permeable nature of things: In the Americas, Babalú-Ayé vessels always have various holes in their lids, allowing offerings to enter but also symbolizing the difficulty in containing illness completely. These holes are often explicitly compared to sores that pock the orisha’s skin. This permeability also appears in the sackcloth and raffia fringe called mariwó used to dress the orisha.
- Secrecy and revelation: The contrast between silence and speech, darkness, and light, and secrecy and revelation permeate the worship of Babalú-Ayé. According to the tradition, certain things must remain secret to sustain their ritual power or their healthy function. In turn, inappropriate revelation leads to illness and other negative manifestations. Conversely the appropriate revelation of information can provide important teaching and guidance.
- Wickedness and righteousness: Represented in sacred narratives as a transgressor in some instances, Babalú-Ayé himself is condemned to exile because he breaks the social contract. The physical pain of his lame leg transforms into the emotional pain of exile. Only after spending much time in isolation does he return to society. In other contexts, he is lauded as the most righteous of all the orishas. Similarly, he is often referred to as punishing the offense of human beings.
- Exile and movement: Strongly associated with the forest and the road itself, the key stories and ceremonies related to Babalú-Ayé involve movement as an antidote to stagnation. In Lucumí and Arará ceremonies in Cuba, his vessel is ritually moved from place to place in important initiations. But through this movement through different spaces, Babalú-Ayé regularly appears as a complex, even liminal, figure who unites various realms. Strongly associated with powerful herbs used for poisons and panaceas, he is sometimes associated with Osain and the powerful acts of magicians. Strongly associated with the Earth and the ancestors buried within it, he is sometimes ritually honored with the dead. At the same time, he is widely included as an orisha, or a fodún as the Arará traditionally call their deities in Cuba. Similarly the dogs strongly associated with Babalú-Ayé move from the house, to the street, to the forest, and back with relative facility.
- Death and resurrection: Last but not least, Babalú-Ayé's journey of exile, debilitation, and finally restoration addresses the cyclic nature of all life. While this theme of transcendence plays a much more prominent role in the Americas than in West Africa, it is also present there in narratives about epidemics befalling kings and kingdoms, only to find relief and remedy in Babalú-Ayé.

== See also ==
- Ayé
- "Babalú" (Cuban song)
- "BaBalu" (studio album)
- Church of Lukumi Babalu Aye
- List of Yoruba deities
- Sopona

== General and cited references ==
- Brown, David H. (2003). Santería Enthroned: Art, Ritual, and Innovation in an Afro-Cuban Religion. Chicago: University of Chicago Press.
- Buckley, Anthony D. (1985). Yoruba Medicine. Oxford: Clarendon Press.
- Ecun, Oba (1996). Ita: Mythology of the Yoruba Religion. Miami: ObaEcun Books.
- Ellis, A. B. (1894). The Yoruba-speaking peoples of the Slave Coast of West Africa. Their religion, manners, customs, laws, language, etc. London: Chapman and Hall.
- Friedson, Steven M. (2009). Remains of Ritual: Northern Gods in a Southern Land. Chicago: University of Chicago Press.
- Herskovits, Melville (1938). Dahomey: An Ancient West African Kingdom. New York: J.J. Augustin.
- Idowu, E. Bolaji (1962). Olodumare: God in Yoruba Belief. London: Longmans, Green, and Co.
- Lele, Ocha'ni (2003). The Diloggun: The Orishas, Proverbs, Sacrifices, and Prohibitions of Cuban Santeria. Rochester, Vt.: Destiny Books.
- Lovell, Nadia (2002). Cord of Blood: Possession and the Making of Voodoo. London: Pluto Press.
- Lucas, J. Olumide (1996). The Religion of the Yoruba: Being an Account of the Religious Beliefs and Practices of the Yoruba People of Southwest Nigeria. Especially about the Religion of Egypt. Brooklyn, NY: Athelia Henrietta Press. [Originally published in 1948 in London by the Church Missionary Society Bookshop.]
- Mason, Michael Atwood (2009, 2010, 2011, 2012). Baba Who? Babalú! Blog. http://baba-who-babalu-santeria.blogspot.com/
- McKenzie, Peter (1997). Hail Orisha! A Phenomenology of a West African Religion in the Mid-Nineteenth Century. Leiden, the Netherlands: Brill.
- Ramos, Miguel "Willie" (1996). "Afro-Cuban Orisha Worship". In A. Lindsey, ed., Santería Aesthetics in Contemporary Latin American Art, pp. 51–76. Washington, DC: Smithsonian Institution Press.
- Rosenthal, Judy (1998). Possession, Ecstasy, and Law in Ewe Voodoo. Charlottesville: University of Virginia Press.
- Thompson, Robert F. (1993). Face of the Gods: Art and Altars of Africa and the African Americas. The Museum for African Art. p. 334. ISBN 978-0-945802-13-6.
- Verger, Pierre F. (1957). Notes sur le culte des orisa et vodun a Bahia, la Baie de tous les Saints, au Brésil, et à l’ancienne Côte des Esclaves en Afrique. Dakar: IFAN.
- Voeks, Robert A. (1997). Sacred Leaves of Candomblé: African Magic, Medicine, and Religion in Brazil. Austin: University of Texas Press.
- Wenger, Susanne. 1983. A Life With the Gods in their Yoruba Homeland. Wörgl, Austria: Perlinger Verlag.
