= Sopona =

Orisha of smallpox and aspect of Babalu Ayé in the Yoruba religion

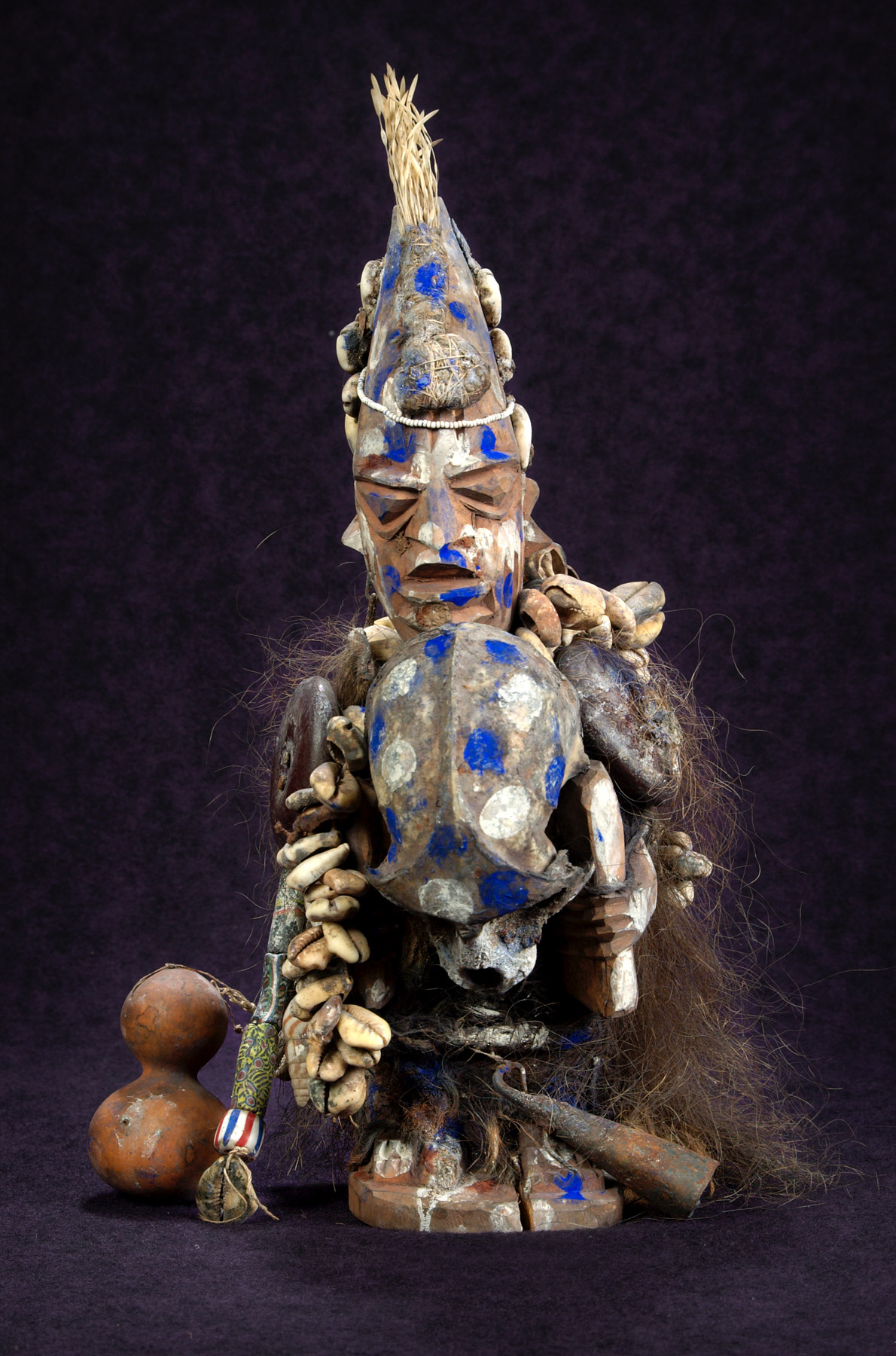
This carved wooden statue of Sopona was one of approximately 50 created by a traditional healer as commemorative objects for the CDC, WHO, and other public health experts attending a 1969 conference on smallpox eradication. It is adorned with layers of meaningful objects such as monkey skulls, cowrie shells, and nails.

Ṣọ̀pọ̀na (or Shapona) is the god of smallpox in the Yoruba religion. The Yoruba people took their traditions about Shapona to the New World when they were transported in the slave trade. He is seen as a vengeful aspect of the Yoruba deity Ọbaluaye and has become known as Babalú-Ayé, among many other names, in the Orisha-based religions that developed in the Americas.

Within the traditional religion of the Yoruba people of Nigeria, smallpox was believed to be a disease foisted upon humans due to Shapona's “divine displeasure.” Formal worship of the god of smallpox was highly controlled by specific priests in charge of shrines to the god. Prior to the early 20th century, people of this religion believed that if the priests were angered, they were capable of causing smallpox outbreaks through their intimate relationship with Shapona. The name "Ṣapona" (alt. Shapona, Saponna, etc.) is considered a secret and taboo name, not to be spoken aloud in respect for the power of the Lord of Infectious Disease. For this reason, the deity has a number of other names and titles which have been in use since the pre-modern period, such as Omolu.

Ṣapona is the traditional, sacred and protected name of the Orisha euphemistically known as Babalú-Ayé or Omolu. Speaking his true name is avoided so as to not invoke the power of disease.

Dr. Oguntola Sapara suspected that the priests were deliberately spreading the disease, and surreptitiously joined the cult. He discovered that the priests were causing the disease through applying scrapings of the skin rash of smallpox cases. Based on this information, the British colonial rulers banned the worship of Shapona in 1907. Worship continues, however, with the faithful paying homage to the god even after such activities were prohibited.

== Dahomey religion/Gbe religion ==
In Dahomean religion Sopono is known as Sakpata, Shakpana or similarly Sopono. He is the divinity of the earth, wellness, smallpox, and can heal or inflict both insanity and disease on humans. It is known as Sakpata among other Gbe speaking people such as Ewe, Fon and Adja. Their territory stretches from south western Nigeria to the Volta Region of Ghana. Oral history has it that this disease decimated their ancestors during their sojourn at Adja Tado until they were cured by a Yoruba man known as Torgbui Anyi. Sakpata is one of the most worshiped deities among them.

== Candomblé ==
Sopona is known in the Afro-Brazilian tradition of Candomblé as Sakpata or Sakpata-Omolu in the (Jejé nation). He is associated with the colors red, black, and white, as in Africa. Insects associated with him are Sakpata-Omolu beetles, black butterflies, flies, and mosquitoes. A skirt and hood made of straw that covers the entire body is the clothing associated with Sakpata-Omolu followers and worship. In the Jejé tradition, Kpo and Loko are also associated with straw clothing. The xaxará, a broom with palm or straw bristles, is used in Sakpata-Omolu rituals. Small gourds, white cowry shells, a black necklace (laguidibá) are all accessories associated with Sakpata-Omolu. He is seen to have both the power to inflict and cure skin disease and other contagious diseases. In present times this includes HIV/AIDS.

== Trinidad Orisha ==
In the Trinidad Orisha tradition, Sopona is known as Shakpana or Ṣakpanna, and is similarly a ferocious god associated with healing smallpox. In a survey of Orisha shrines on Trinidad, James Houk found that flags to Ogun are found in almost every location. Those to Shakpana and Osain (Osanyin) closely follow in popularity.

== Literature ==
- Bader, Richard-Ernst: Sopono, Pocken und Pockengottkult der Yoruba. Erster Teil. Medizinhistorisches Journal 20 (1985) 363-390 (German)
- Bader, Richard-Ernst: Sopono, Pocken und Pockengottkult der Yoruba. Zweiter Teil. Medizinhistorisches Journal 21 (1986) 31-91 (German)
- Idowu, E. Bolaji. 1962. Olodumare: God in Yoruba Belief. London: Longmans, Green, and Co.
- McKenzie, Peter. 1997. Hail Orisha! A Phenomenology of a West African Religion in the Mid-Nineteenth Century. Leiden, the Netherlands: Brill.
