= Yemowo =

Water deity and wife of Ọbatala in Yoruba religion

- Water; Creation; Maternity
- Member of Orisha
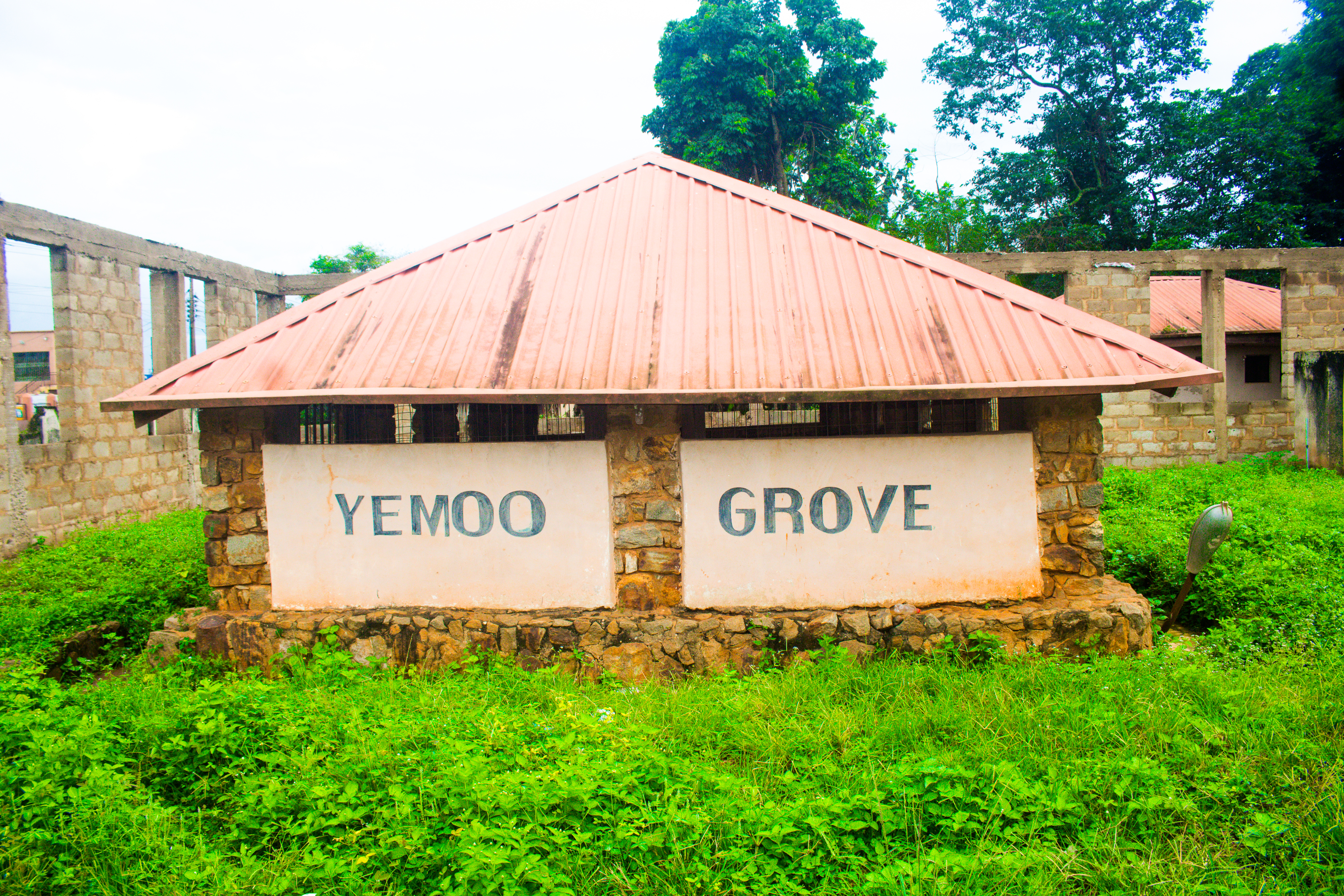
- Yemòó Shrine, Ifẹwara, Ile-Ife.
- Other names: Yemòó, Iyemowo, Yèyé Mòwó
- Venerated in: Yoruba religion
- Major cult center: Ile-Ife
- Symbol: Sea, mother of pearl
- Color: white, sky blue
- Region: Yorubaland
- Ethnic group: Yoruba
- Consort: Ọbatala

In Yoruba religion, Yemowo (Yoruba: Yemòwó; or Yemòó) is an oriṣa of water, maternity and creation, and her consort is Ọbatala.

== Etymology ==
From the Yoruba words iye/iya (“mother”) and mòwó, literally “Mother Mòwó”.

== Worship ==
Yemòwó's role in the modern Yoruba religion has been severely relegated to only Ifẹ despite the widespread worship of her husband Ọbatala. This is probably because many other female deities have taken her role. (Note: For example, Yemòó is usually replaced by Yemọja as the consort of Ọbatala and the deity who aided Ọbatala in creating humans in stories.)

== See also ==
- Ọbatala
- Yemọja
- Mawu
