= Ọrun =

Spirit World in the Yoruba religion

Ọrun (Yoruba: Ọ̀run; "The place of origin", also called Ikole Orun or Ode Orun), is the celestial place that serves as both an afterworld for the deceased and the abode of the divinities in the Yoruba religion. It was created and is ruled by Olodumare, the Supreme Deity. It is the place of origin for all humans where souls are made, and where humans return to after death. The sky is sometimes called Oju Ọrun which literally means "face of Ọrun".

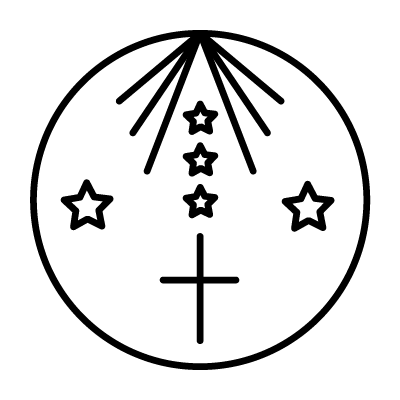
Veve of Obatala, king of the Oriṣa, who in the Yoruba creation story is said to have descended from Ọrun to create the Earth.

The universe in Yoruba cosmology is described as a metaphysical calabash (igba), whose top half represents the spiritual world, Orun and bottom half represents the physical world, Ayé. The physical world is also described as "a marketplace [we visit], while the otherworld is home". The term Orun Rere (lit. 'Good Heaven') is used by Yoruba Christians and Muslims to refer to Heaven and Jannah, while Orun Apaadi (lit. 'Heaven of clay potsherds') is used to refer to Hell and Jahannam.

== Etymology ==
Ọ̀run is a compound Yoruba noun composed of two elements: the nominalizing prefix ọ̀ and the verb run which means "to originate". Thus, Ọ̀run literally means "the place of origin". Yoruba words such as orirun ("the source of the soul") and orisun ("the source of water") are also closely related in etymology with ọ̀run.

== Cultural practices ==
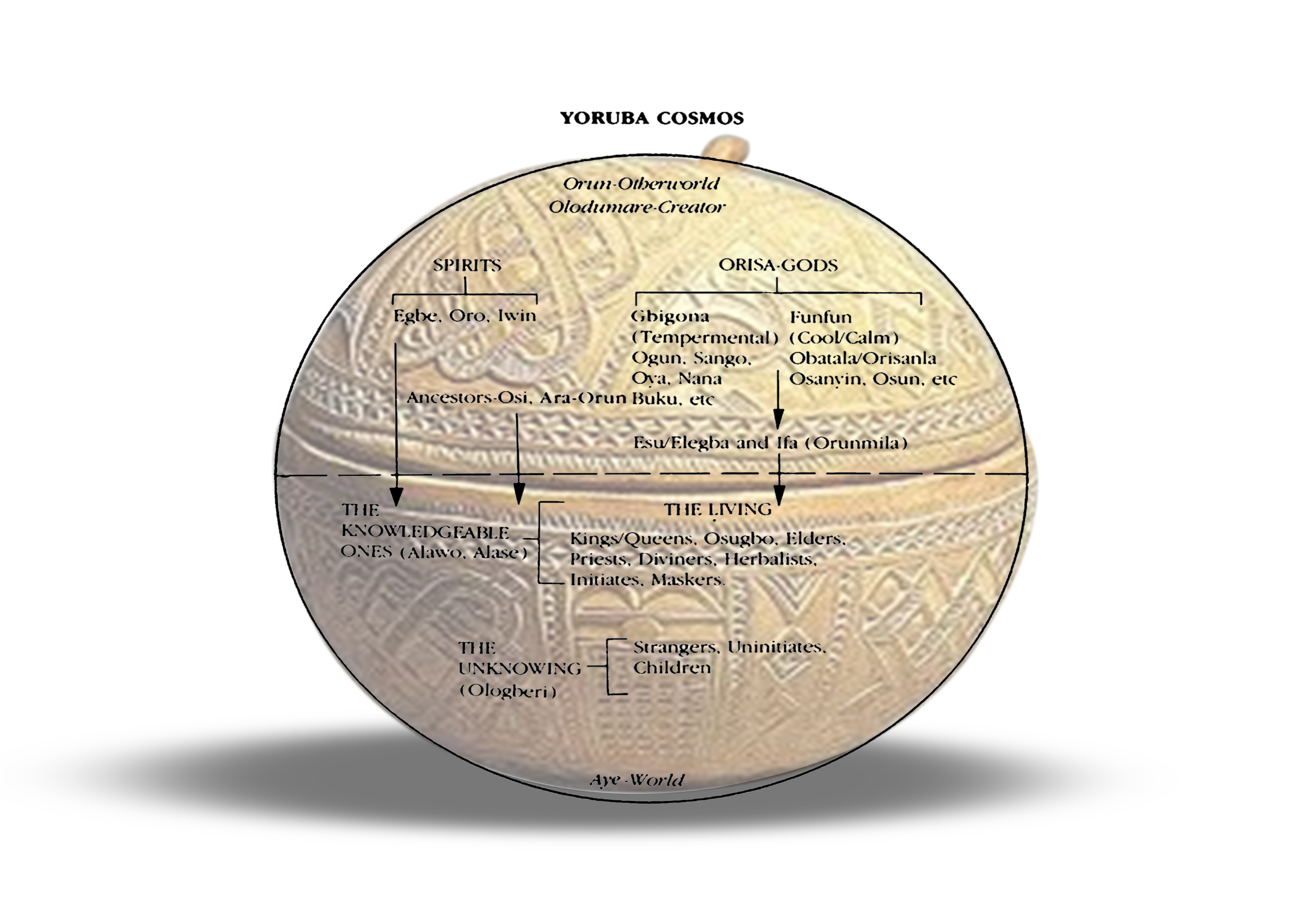
Representation of the universe in Isese

The belief in Ọ̀run led to several cultural practices associated with death and commemoration among the Yoruba and other related groups.

=== Ara Ọ̀run/Egungun ===
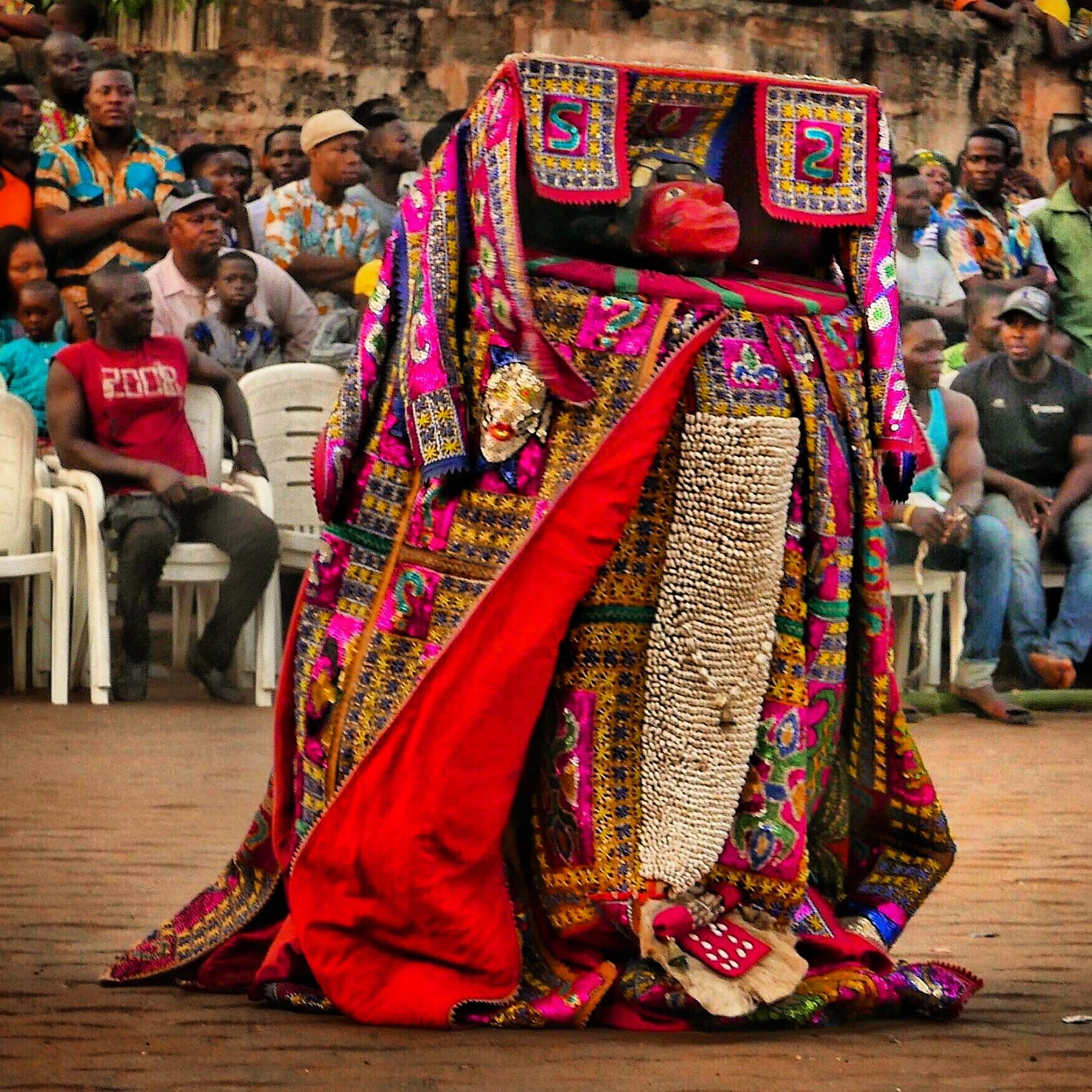
An Egungun

Ancestors in Orun are referred to as Ara Ọ̀run and their physical manifestations are called Egungun. It is believed that ancestors have the power to watch over their descendants. Therefore, people make an effort to remember their ancestors on a regular basis. This is ancestor veneration, which some have wrongly labelled ancestor worship. It is believed that the love that exists between a parent and a child here on earth should continue even after death. And since the parent has only ascended to another plane of existence, it should be possible for the link to remain strong. Masquerade festivals for ancestor reverence are also called Egungun.

=== Orúkọ Àmútọ̀runwá ===
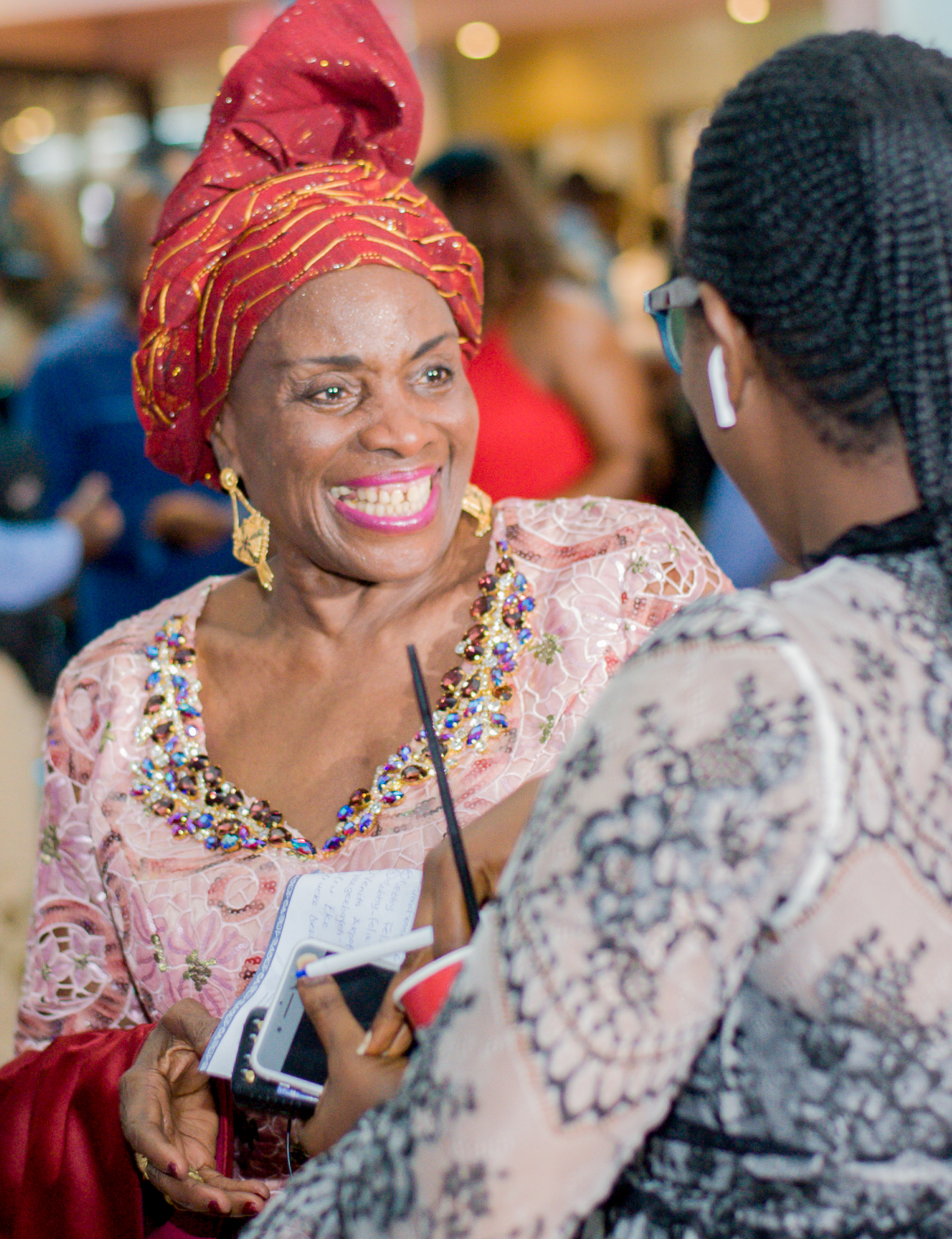
Taiwo Ajai-Lycett, a Nigerian poet with the orúkọ amutọ̀runwa "Taiwo"

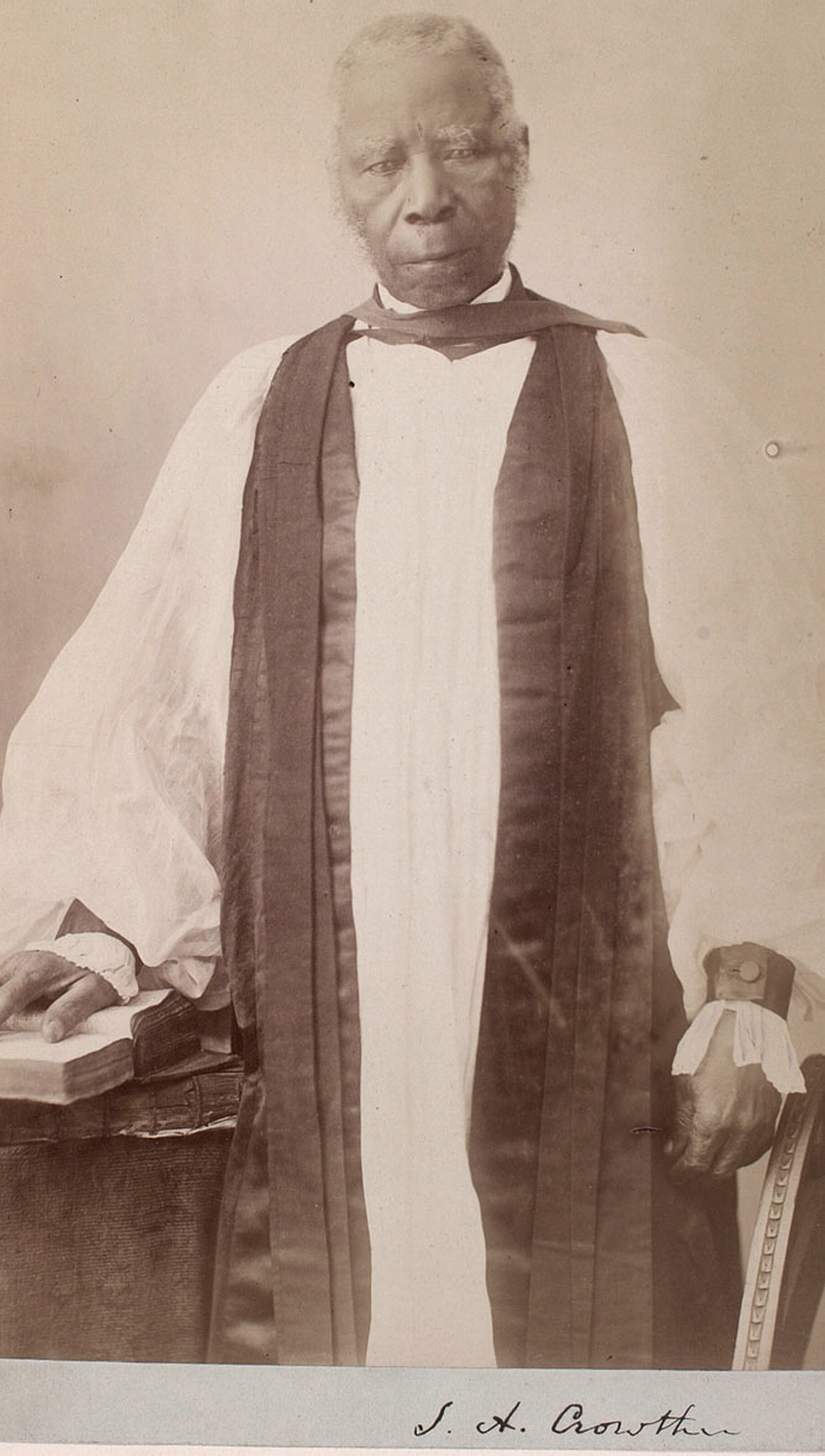
Samuel Ajayi Crowther, a Nigerian linguist with the name Ajayi, an orúkọ amutọ̀runwa, in 1867

Yoruba believe that a baby may come with a pre-ordained name, known as orúkọ àmútọ̀runwá (which means "name brought from Orun"). Twins (ibeji) are believed to be sacred and have orùkọ àmútọ̀runwá. The first to be born of the twins is named Tayewo (which means "taster of ayé"). It is believed that the first twin is sent by the other one from Orun to taste the world. If he/she stays there, it follows that it is not bad, and that would send a signal to the other one to start coming. Hence the second to arrive is named Kehinde ("late arrival"). Other orúko àmútọ̀runwá include Alaba, Idogbe, Ige, Ojo/Aina, Dada, Ajayi and multiple others.

== Modern influence ==
- Apaadi is the name of a 2009 Nigerian film. It is the first epic film by the popular filmmaker and director Funke Akindele.
- Orun Mooru is the name of a 1982 comedy film directed by Ola Balogun and produced by Moses Olaiya.
- Orun is the name of a song by Ayra Starr.
- Orun x Designers was a fashion event held during the Africa Fashion Tour in September 2025. It was hosted by a Pan-African organisation called Orun.

== See also ==
- Ọlọrun
- Ayé
- Celtic Otherworld
- Heaven
