= Ọbatala =

King of the Orisha in Yoruba religion

- King of the Oriṣa; Wisdom; Creation; Sky; Purity; Heaven
- Member of Irunmọlẹ
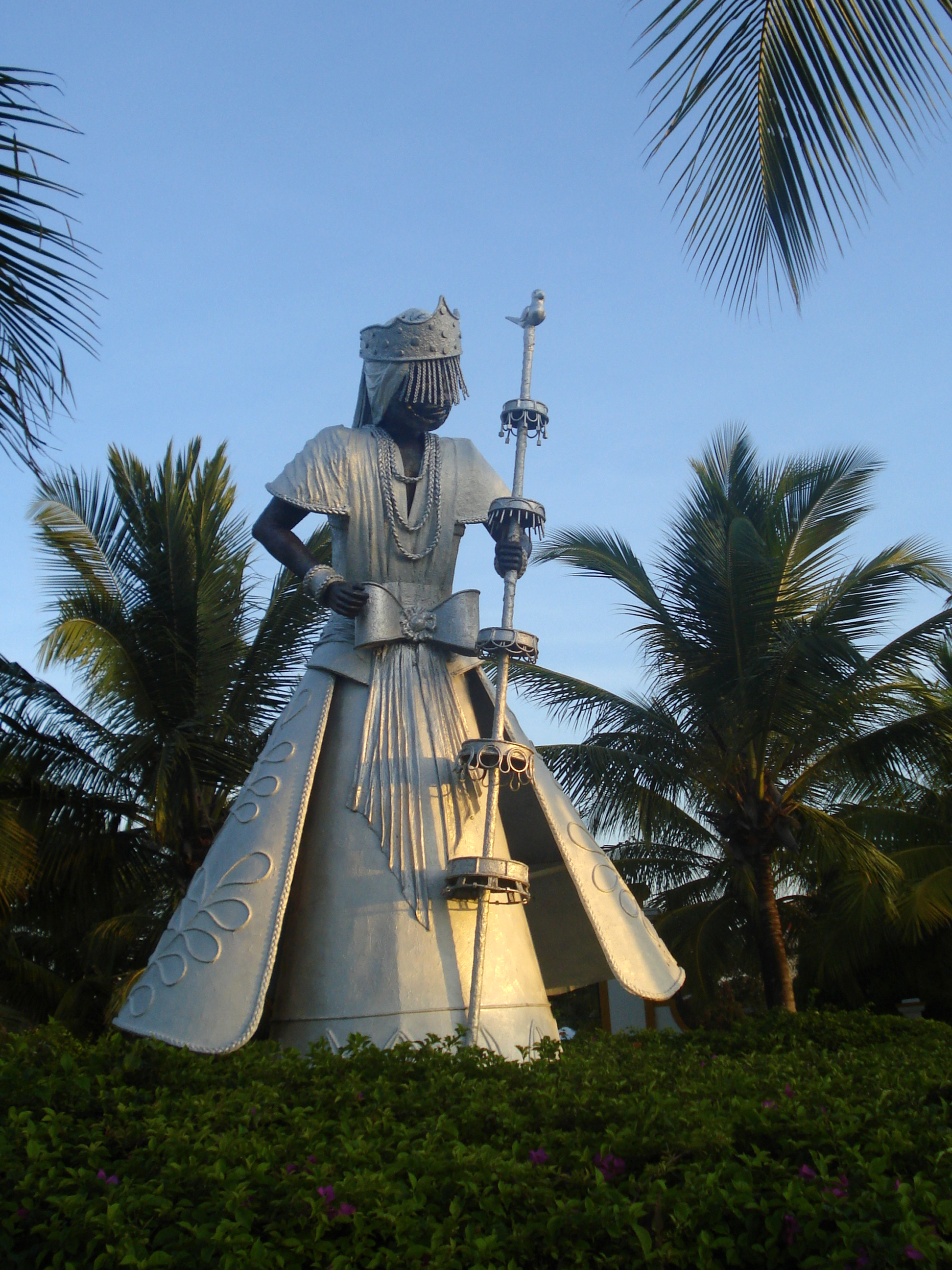
- Statue of Obatala in Costa do Sauípe, Bahía
- Other names: Obatala or Obatalá; Ooṣala or Ochala or Oxalá; Oriṣa or Abarịṣa; and Oriṣanla or Orichalá or Orixalá
- Venerated in: Yoruba religion
- Major cult center: Ile-Ife
- Symbol: Opasoro, white doves, white cloth, Oba's crown
- Day: The first day of the Kọjọda week; Sunday
- Color: White
- Region: Yorubaland, Latin America
- Ethnic group: Yoruba
- Festivals: World Ọbatala Festival

Genealogy
- Spouse: Yemòó (Ile-Ife, modern-day Nigeria); Yemọja (Americas)
- Offspring: Oloja of Iranje-Idita, Olufon, Obalesun, Obalale, Ogiyan (of Ejigbo), Akalako or Apetumodu (of Ipetumodu) etc. (earthly); Yewá (divine)

Obatala (lit. 'King of White Cloth') also known as Oriṣanla (lit. 'The Great Orisha') is the king of all oriṣa in the Yoruba religion, believed to have created the Earth (Ile Ayé) and humans. In some versions of the story, he failed the task by being drunk on palm wine after being tempted by the trickster deity Eshu and was outperformed by his little brother Oduduwa. He was instead given the job of creating human beings. This was authorized by the Supreme Deity, Olodumare which gave Obatala the name "sculptor of humankind".

"Obatala descended from Heaven on a chain to mold the first humans and now molds every child in the womb, according to the Yoruba. Obatala created the world and humanity, whereas Ọlọrun breathed life into humanity. Ọbatala is therefore considered the father of humanity and owner of all the heads where human souls reside."

Obatala had worked on his task with the assistance of Yemòó. (Note: In some versions, Yemòó is replaced with the water deity Yemọja or Oṣun.) He is believed to be successful at creating human beings with water and clay.

According to the oral traditions of Ifẹ, the mortal Obatala was the founder and king of Ife during its classical period. His position as the King was challenged by Oduduwa who assumed leadership of the town for a brief moment. However, Obatala was able to emerge victorious in the contest and it led to the murder of his rival Oduduwa and the retrieval of his throne.

While there exists an Obatala in the Yoruba pantheon, the understanding of the qualities of the deity Obatala was merged into the human Obatala that ruled in Ifẹ upon his posthumous deification. Thus, the human Obatala who was the king at Ife was admitted to the Yoruba pantheon as an aspect of the primordial divinity of the same name.

== Mythology ==
According to Yoruba mythology, Obatala is the oldest of all of the orishas and was granted authority to create the Earth. Due to Obatala being drunk, in some versions of the story, Oduduwa took this opportunity to show his worth to Olodumare. He took the satchel that Olodumare had given Obatala to aid him in creation and used it to create land on the primeval ocean. Oduduwa did such a great job that Olodumare granted him the title "God of the Earth."

Obatala was then given the task to create human beings. With this task he took a "long gold chain, a snail's shell filled with sand, a white hen, a black cat, and a palm nut" and climbed down to the end of the chain.

He released the white hen which spread the sand from the shell onto the ocean to create mountains and valleys. He also planted the palm nut to create a forest.

After being content with what he created, he started to mold human beings from clay. During this creative progress, he was drinking a large amount of palm wine, created from the palm nut forest, which caused him to create deformed figures in his drunken state.

When he became sober and realized what he had done, he vowed to never drink again and protect people with disabilities.

After he successfully created the human being figures, they were given aṣẹ, a copper knife, and a wooden hoe. They were able to prosper.

== In Africa ==
=== Primordial Obatala ===
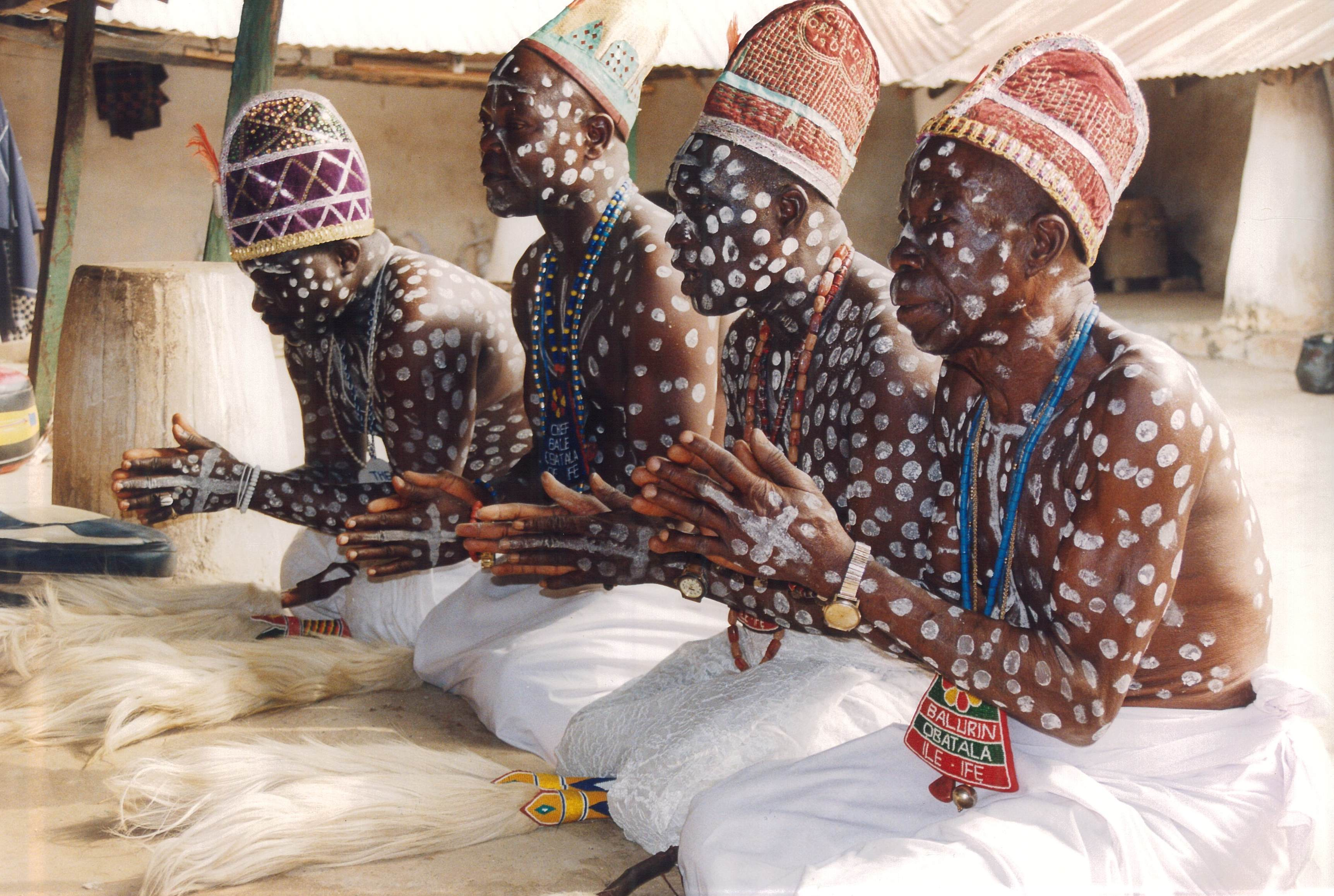
Obatala priests praying in their temple in Ile-Ife

According to the tenets of the Yoruba religion, Obatala is the oldest of all of the orishas and was granted authority to create the Earth. A tradition states that before he could return to heaven and report to Olodumare, Oduduwa usurped his responsibility (due to Obatala's being drunk at the time). He took the satchel that Olodumare had given Obatala to aid him in creation and used it to create land on the primeval ocean. A great feud ensued between the two siblings. However, an assessment of Yoruba traditional religion shows that each of the 201 deities are understood by their descendants and adherents to have carried out the creation of the earth. This suggests the beginning of the world is an aspect of Yoruba cosmogenesis associated with numerous deities in Yoruba pantheons beyond Obatala or Oduduwa.

=== Mortal Obatala ===
Oba Obatala was the founder and the King of Ile-Ife, hence the appellation, Olufe. His reign was disrupted by an usurpation led by Oduduwa and his supporters such as Obameri, Obadio, Aloran, Ejio and Apata. However, Obatala was able to facilitate the death of Oduduwa and retrieve his throne as the king of Ile-Ife with the assistance of his support base consisting of Oluorogbo, Orunmila, Akire, Obalufon Ogbogboinrin (Obamakin), Owa Ilare and numerous others. This is re-enacted every year in the Obatala festival in Ife and the coronation rites of Ooni which indicate Obatala's ownership of the crown, throne and authority. Ultimately, following the war between Obatala on the one hand and Oduduwa on the other, the latter lost and his support base dispersed, leading to a rotated rulership between the lineages of Obatala and Obalufon Ogbogbodinrin (Obamakin) who succeeded him. This was in effect till a coup conducted by Lajamisan, a descendant of Oranfe, disrupted the ruling structure.

== In the Americas ==
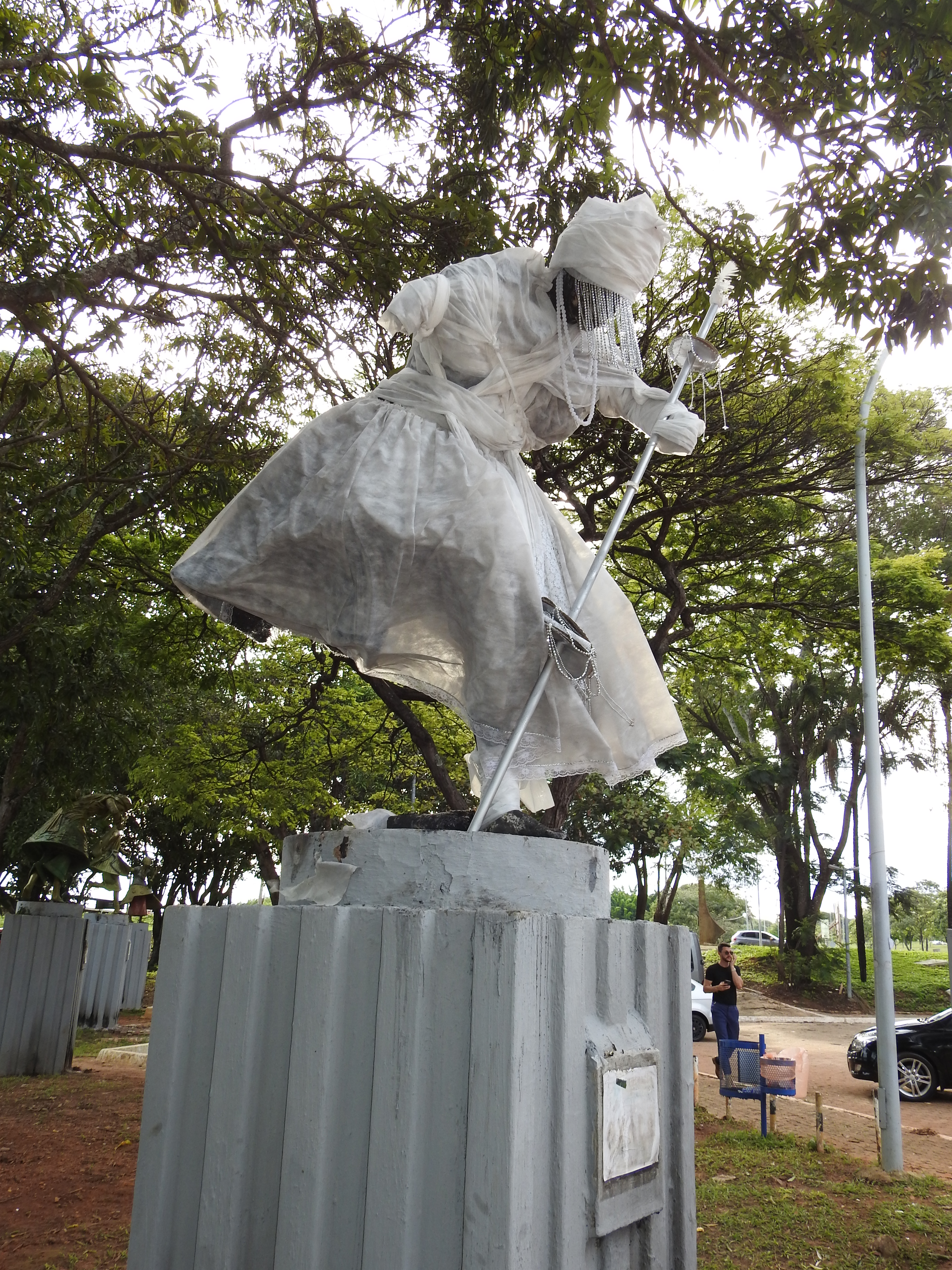
Oxalá statue, Brazil.

=== Santería ===
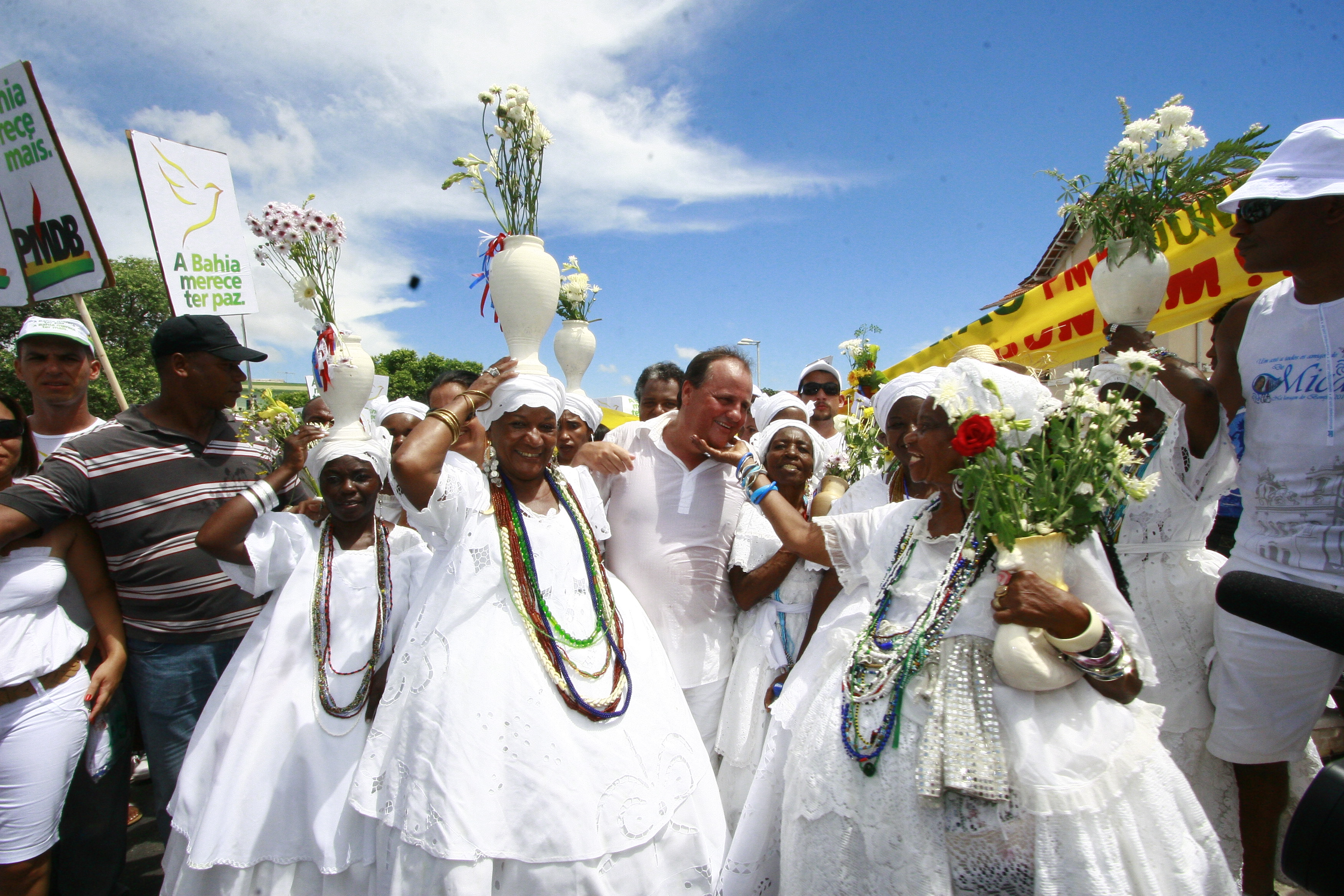
Festa do Bonfim, Bahia.

Obatalá is the oldest "orisha fúnfún" ("white deity"), referring to purity, both physically and symbolically as in the "light" of consciousness. In Santería, Obatalá is syncretized with Our Lady of Mercy and Jesus Of Nazareth. Obatalá is said to have an equal number of male paths as female paths, but more often crowns women in part because men are traditionally crowned in Ifá in many lineages.

=== Candomblé ===
In Candomblé, Oxalá (Obatalá) has been syncretized with Our Lord of Bonfim; in that role, he is the patron saint of Bahia. The extensive use of white clothing, which is associated with the worship of Oxalá, has become a symbol of Candomblé in general. Friday is the day dedicated to the worship of Oxalá. A large syncretic religious celebration of the Festa do Bonfim in January in Salvador celebrates both Oxalá and Our Lord of Bonfim; it includes the washing of the church steps with a special water, made with flowers.

=== Snails ===
The snail Achatina fulica is used for religious purposes in Brazil as an offering to Obatala. It is seen as a substitute for the African giant snail (Archachatina marginata) that is used in Yorubaland because they are known by the same name (Igbin, also known as Ibi) in both Brazil and Yorubaland.

== Offerings and rituals ==
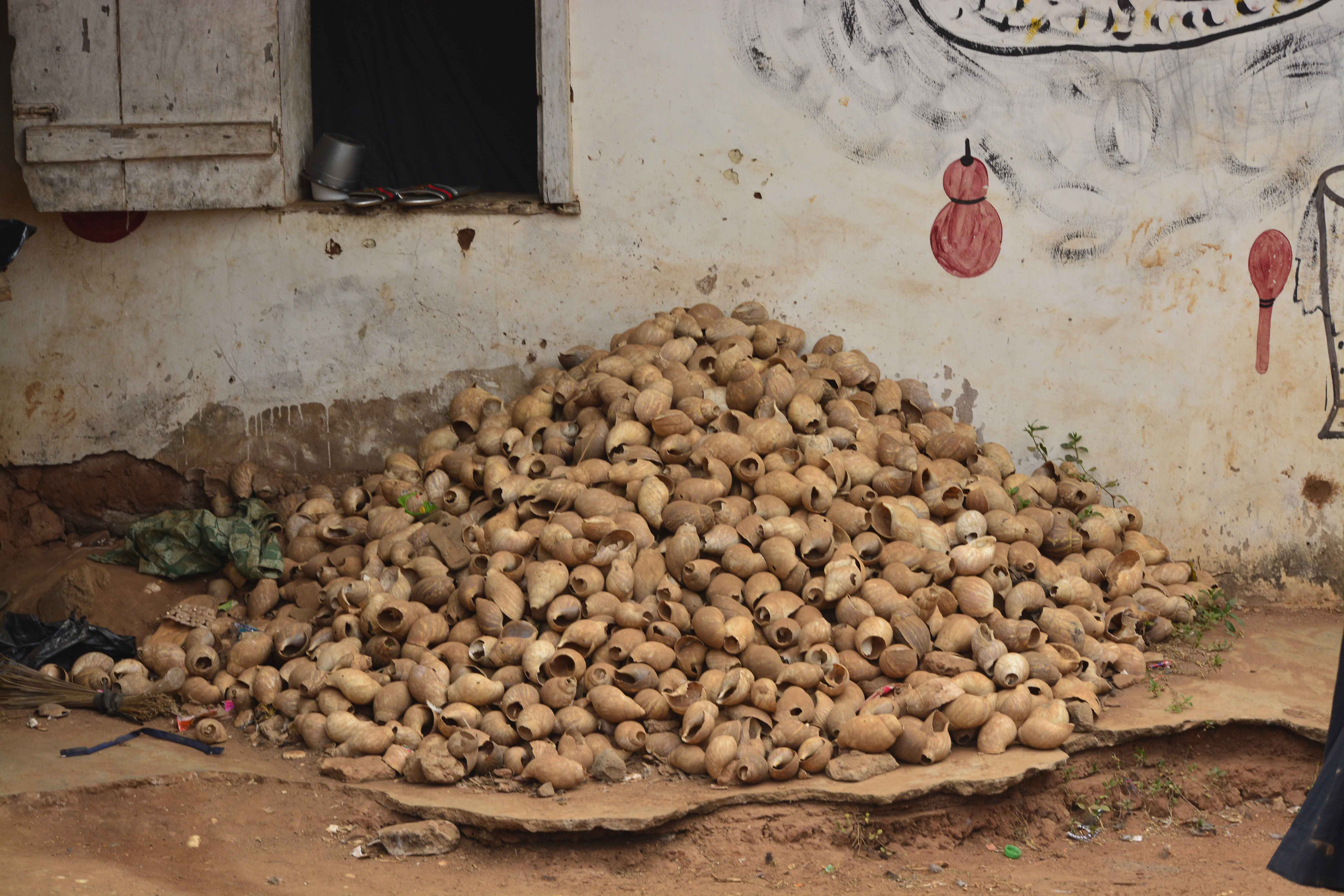
Obatala shrine in Ota, Ogun, Nigeria

In terms of offering to orishas, female orishas (Iabás) "eat" female animals, while male Orishas (Borós) "eat" male animals. However, Obatala is the only male orisha who "eats" in the Iabás circle, thus accepting sacrifices of female animals in his honor. Bastide commented on the androgynous characteristics of Obatala as an explanation of why this orisha accepts female animals as offerings. According to some priests, however, Obatala does not have a sex, since, according to the myths, he is the Father of Creation. Obatala is therefore the equivalent of God in the catholic syncretism who also does not have a specific sex.

Unlike other Orisha, Obatala only accepts offerings cooked in honey, as he has a distaste for dende oil.

Like any other Orisha, Obatala does not specifically eat the offering himself, but consumes the energy of the offering, or Axé. The expression "eat" is used as a symbolism for a spiritual form of feeding. Orishas do not "come down" from the spiritual plane to eat (literally speaking) the animal being offered.

Traditionally speaking, for sacrificial offerings to Obatala, considered an orixá-funfun (literally "white orisha"), the animals or their parts should be completely white, such as the white blood of the mollusk called Igbin (Achatina fulica).

== Epithets (or Oriki) ==
- Oluwa Ayé - Lord of the Earth
- Alabalashe - He who has divine authority (he who owns wishes, and grant them)
- Baba Arugbo - Old Master or Father (Ancient Father/Master)
- Baba Arayé - Master or Father of all human beings
- Oriṣanla (also spelled Orishanla, Orishainla or Oshanla) - the arch divinity
- Olufẹ - King of Ife or Lord of Ife
- Oseremagbo - King of Ugbo

== See also ==
- Olorun
- Oriṣa
- Oduduwa
- King of the gods

== Bibliography ==
- Idowu, E. Bolaji: Olodumare: God in Yoruba Belief, London 1962.
- Elebuibon, Yemi: Adventures of Obatala, Pt. 2.
- Lange, Dierk: "The dying and the rising God in the New Year Festival of Ife", in: Lange, Ancient Kingdoms of West Africa, Dettelbach 2004, pp. 343–376.
- Marins, Luiz L. Obatala e a Criação do Mundo Ioruba, São Paulo, 2021 [2013]. Author's Edition. ISBN 978-85-914441-0-6.
