= Yemọja =

Major water Orisha in the Yoruba religion

- Water, Moon, Motherhood, Aquatic life, Creation (Note: She is believed to be a creator deity by some of her worshippers) and Protection
- Member of Orisha
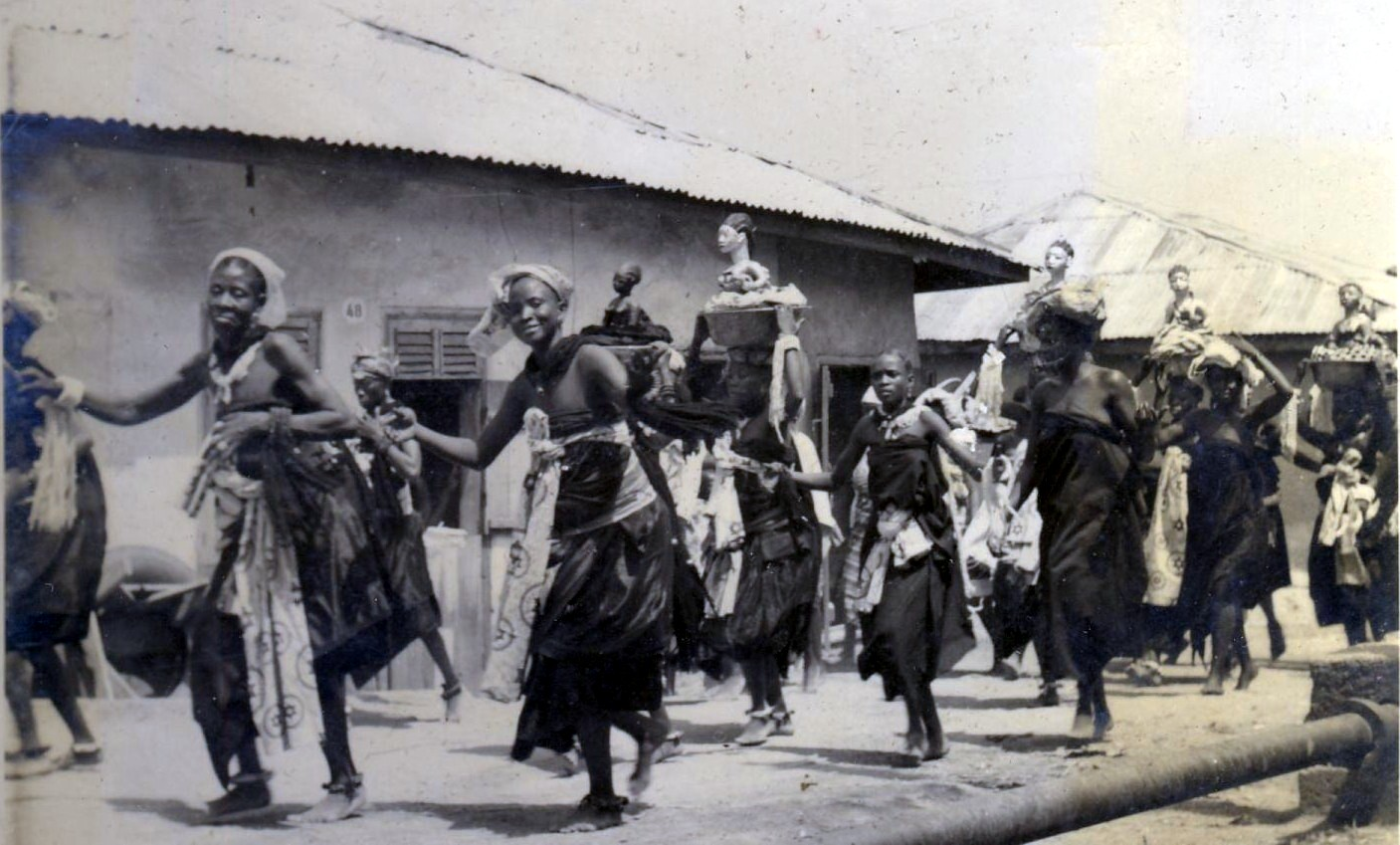
- Procession of Yemoja devotees in Abeokuta, Nigeria, 1961
- Other names: Yemonja • Yemaya • Yemaja • Iemanja
- Venerated in: Yoruba religion • Umbanda • Candomblé • Santeria • Haitian Vodou • Dominican Vudú
- Major cult center: Abeokuta
- Symbols: water • the moon • cowrie shells
- Day: 2 February; 31 December; 8 December; 7 September
- Color: Blue and White/Crystal beads
- Number: Seven
- Region: Yorubaland • Brazil • Cuba
- Ethnic group: Yoruba people

Equivalents
- Greek: Selene
- Roman: Luna • Ceres
- Bakongo: Nzambici
- Igbo: Ala

Yemọja (also: Yemaja, Yemanjá, Yemoyá, Yemayá; there are many different transliterations in other languages) is a major water deity in the Yoruba religion. She is an oriṣa, and the patron spirit of rivers, particularly the Ogun River in Nigeria, and of oceans in Cuban and Brazilian Orisha religions. She is often syncretized with either Our Lady of Regla in the Afro-Cuban diaspora or various other Virgin Mary figures of the Catholic Church, a practice that emerged during the era of the Trans-Atlantic slave trade. Yemọja is said to be motherly and strongly protective, and to care deeply for all her children, comforting them and cleansing them of sorrow. She is said to be able to cure infertility in women, and cowrie shells represent her wealth. She does not easily lose her temper, but when angered she can be quite destructive and violent, as the flood waters of turbulent rivers. This makes her sometimes associated with another major water deity, Olokun. Some of the priests of Yemọja believe that she used her fresh water to help Ọbàtálá in the molding of human beings out of clay.

Yemọja is often depicted as a mermaid by a number of devotees, and is associated with water, feminine mysteries, and the moon in some diaspora communities. She is the protector of women. She governs everything pertaining to women; parenting, child safety, love, and healing. According to some beliefs, when her waters broke, it caused a great flood creating rivers and streams and the first mortal humans were created from her womb.

== Name variants ==
- Yoruba: Yemọja, Yemaja, Iyemọja, Yemọnja, Iyemọnja, Iyemẹja or Yemẹja in some Yorùbá dialect variants
- Portuguese phonetic spellings of Brazil: Yemanjá, Iemanjá, Janaína, Mãe da Água
- Spanish phonetic spelling of Cuba, Puerto Rico, and other Spanish speaking countries: Yemayá, Yemallá
- French terms for mermaid spirits: La Sirène, Mère de L'Eau
- Pidgin/Creole Languages: Mami Wata
- Trinidad Orisha: Emanja, Yemonjá
- Louisiana Voodoo: Yemeya

== Africa ==
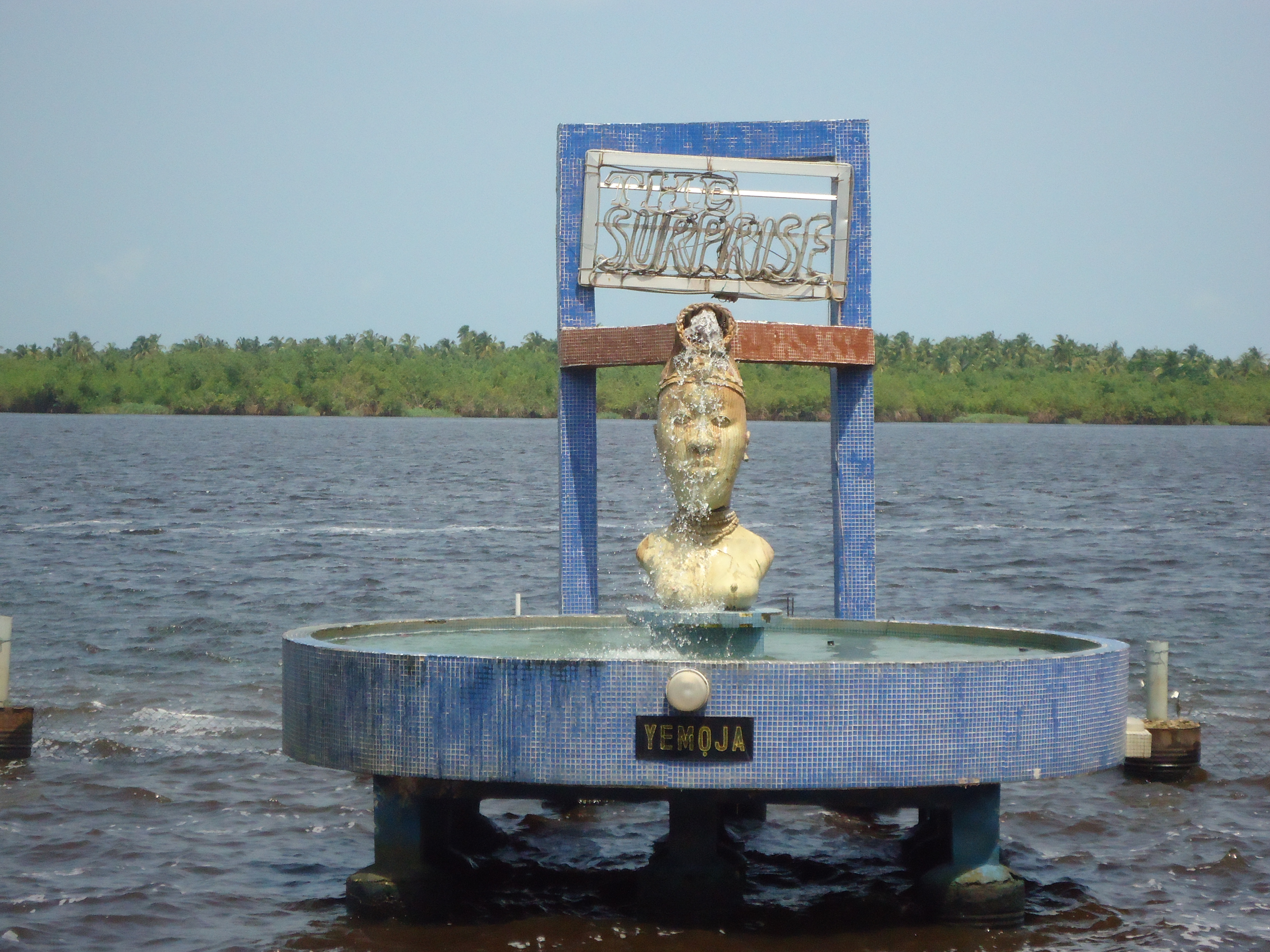
A Yemọja statue at Badagry, Nigeria

In traditional Yoruba culture and spirituality, Yemọja is a mother spirit; patron spirit of women, especially pregnant women; she is the patron deity of the Ogun river (Odò Ògùn) but she has other rivers that are dedicated to her throughout Yorùbáland. In addition, she is also worshipped at almost any stream, creek, springs in addition to wells and run-offs.

Her name is a contraction of the Yoruba words Iye, a dialect variant of "ìyá" meaning "mother"; ọmọ, meaning "child"; and ẹja, meaning "fish"; roughly translated the term means "mother of fish children". This represents the vastness of her motherhood, her fecundity, and her reign over all living things.

The river deity Yemọja is often portrayed as a mermaid, even in West Africa, and she can visit all other bodies of water, but her home and the realm she owns are rivers and streams, especially the Ogun River in Nigeria.

River deities in Yorubaland include Yemo̩ja, Ọ̀ṣun (Oshun), Erinlè̩, Ọbà, Yewá, etc. It is Olókun that fills the role of sea deity in Yorubaland, while Yemọja is a leader of the other river deities.

== Americas ==
In West Africa, Yemọja is worshipped as a high-ranking river deity, but in Brazil and Cuba she is worshipped mainly as a sea/ocean deity.

=== Brazil ===
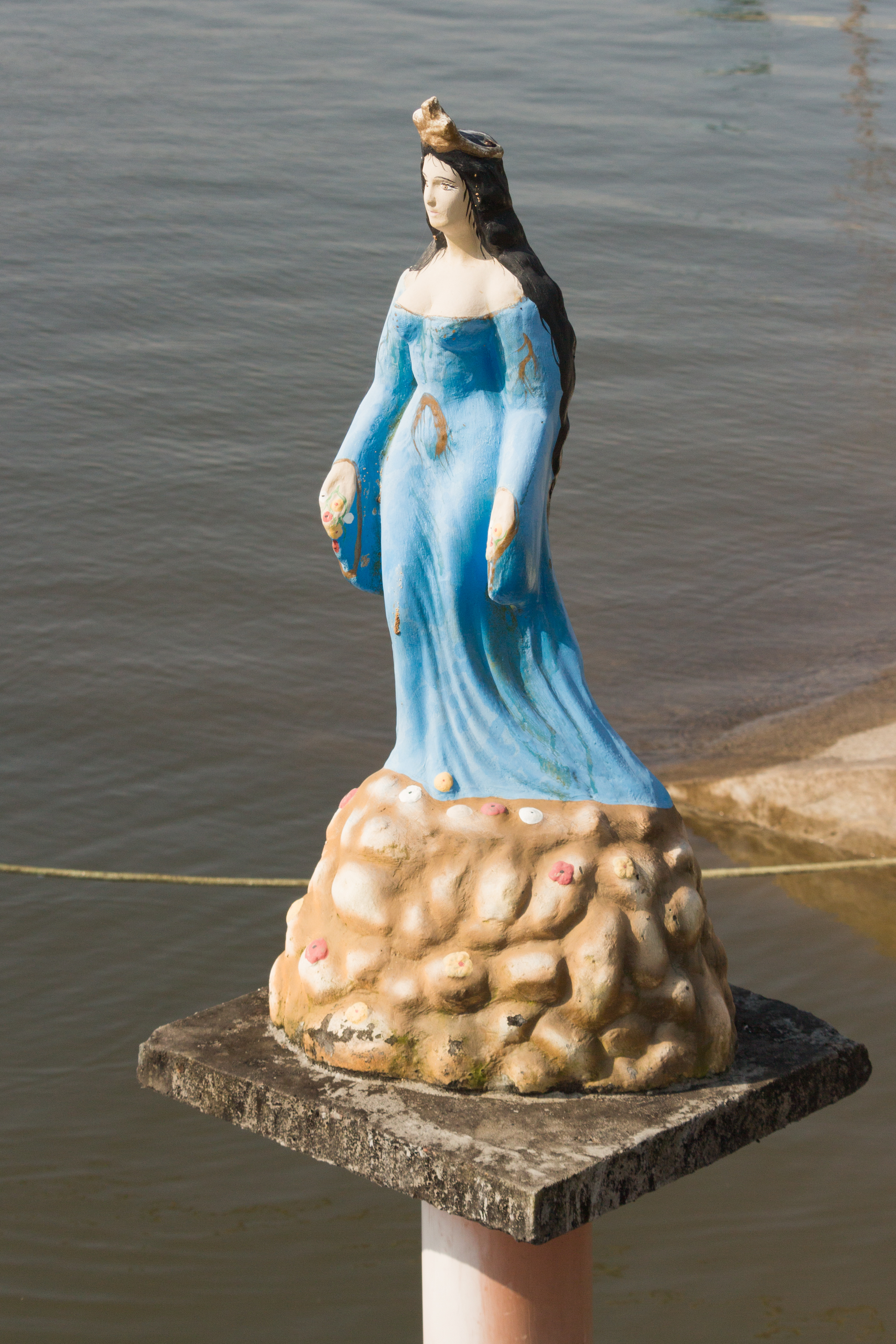
Iemanjá statue, Iguape, Brazil.

An Afro-Brazilian celebration in honour of the sea goddess Iemanjá in Maceió, Brazil

In Candomblé and Umbanda, Yemanjá is one of the seven Orixás. White roses are used as a ritual offering. She is the Queen of the Ocean, the patron spirit of the fishermen and the survivors of shipwrecks, the feminine principle of creation, and the spirit of moonlight. Saturday is the consecrated day of Yemanjá.

- Colors: light blue and crystal
- Ritual garment color: light blue
- Ritual jewelry or necklace: crystalline beads
- Ritual salutation: Odô-Iya, Erù-Iya, Odôfiaba
- Symbols: shells, sea stones

==== Syncretism ====
In Brazil, Yemanjá is syncretized with Our Lady of Navigators (Nossa Senhora dos Navegantes) and Our Lady of the Conception (Nossa Senhora da Conceição).

==== Sacred objects ====
Sacred objects associated with Yemanjá that are placed in the pegi, the room or space dedicated to an orixá, include:

- Dishes and porcelain
- Earthen basins
- Fruits: obi (Cola acuminata) and the bitter kola nut (Garcinia kola)
- White jars or pitchers
- White medals or coins

==== Ritual sacrifice ====
Guinea fowl, ducks, hens, she-goat are sacrificed ("orô") on festival days associated with Yemanjá in the Candomblé tradition. Animals sacrificed to Yemonja must be thrown in the water for their disposal.

==== Ritual foods ====
- Angu, manioc or maize flour boiled in water or milk
- Corn meal
- Lelé, a drink of white corn meal boiled in coconut milk
- Obi, the fruit of Cola acuminata
- Onion, referred to as alubaça
- Rice
- White corn

==== Festivals ====
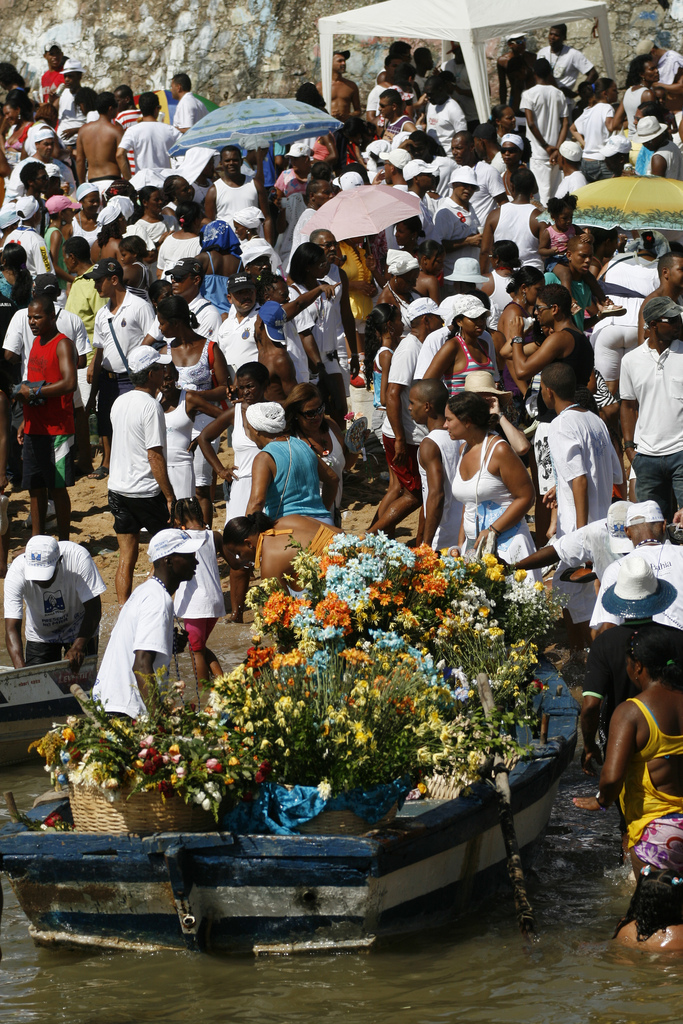
Offerings for lemanjá in Salvador, Brazil

- In Salvador, Bahia, Iemanjá is celebrated by Candomblé on the same day consecrated by the Catholic Church to Our Lady of Seafaring (Nossa Senhora dos Navegantes). Every February 2, thousands of people line up at dawn to leave their offerings at her shrine in Rio Vermelho. Gifts for Iemanjá include flowers and objects of female vanity (perfume, jewelry, combs, lipsticks, mirrors). These are gathered in large baskets and taken out to the sea by local fishermen. Afterwards a massive street party ensues.
- In Pelotas, Rio Grande do Sul State, on February 2, the image of Nossa Senhora dos Navegantes is carried to the port of Pelotas. Before the closing of the Catholic feast, the boats stop and host the Umbanda followers that carry the image of Iemanjá, in a syncretic meeting that is watched by thousand of people on the shore.
- Iemanjá is also celebrated every December 8 in Salvador, Bahia. The Festa da Conceição da Praia (Feast to Our Lady of Conception of the church at the beach) is a city holiday dedicated to the Catholic saint and also to Iemanjá. Another feast occurs on this day in the Pedra Furada, Monte Serrat in Salvador, Bahia, called the Gift to Iemanjá, when fishermen celebrate their devotion to the Queen of the Ocean.
- In São Paulo State, Iemanjá is celebrated in the two first weekends of December on the shores of Praia Grande city. During these days many vehicles garnished with Iemanjá icons and colors (white and blue) roam from the São Paulo mountains to the sea littoral, some of them traveling hundreds of miles. Thousands of people rally near Iemanjá's statue in Praia Grande beach.

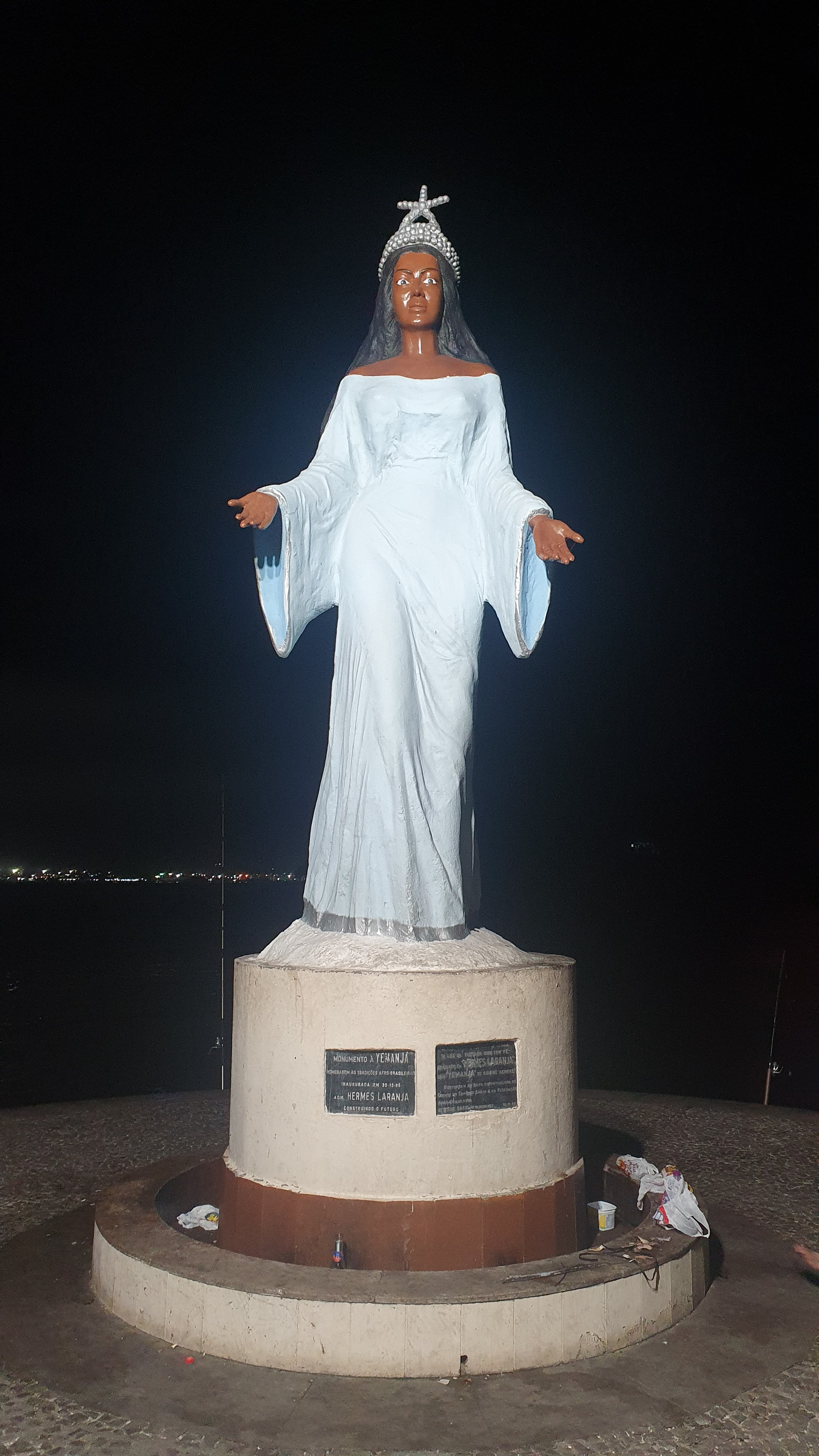
A Yemanjá statue at Píer de Iemanjá (Iemanjá Pier), Vitória, Espírito Santo, Brazil

- On New Year's Eve in Brazil, millions of Brazilians, of all religions, dressed in white gather on the beaches to greet the New Year, watch fireworks, and throw white flowers and other offerings into the sea for the goddess in the hopes that she will grant them their requests for the coming year. Some send their gifts to lemanjá in wooden toy boats. Jumping seven waves is also common. Paintings of lemanjá are sold in Rio shops next to paintings of Jesus and Catholic saints. They portray her as a woman rising out of the sea. Small offerings of flowers and floating candles are left in the sea on many nights at Copacabana.

=== Cuba ===
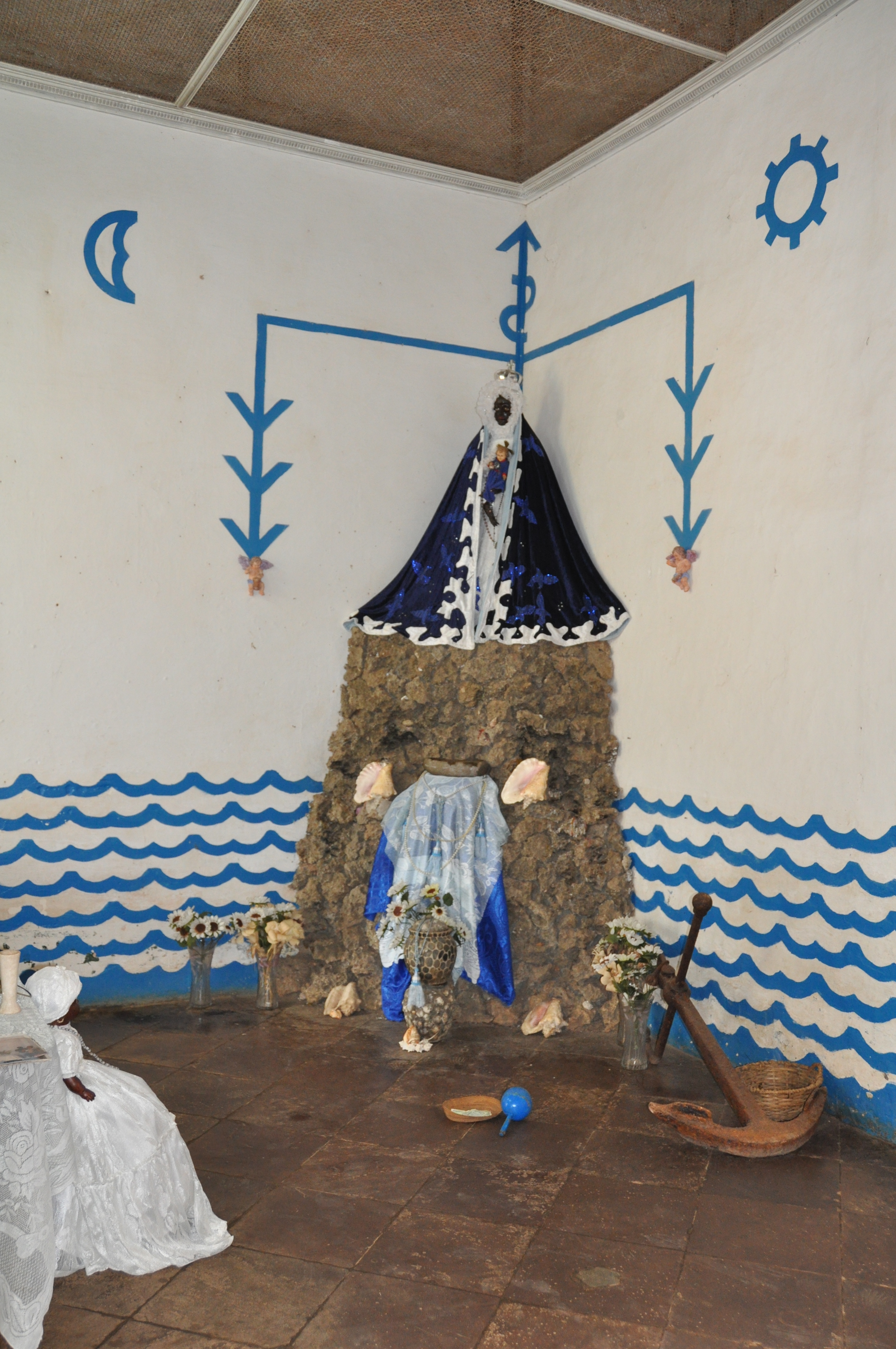
Temple of Yemayà in Trinidad, Cuba.

In Santería or regla de ocha, Yemayá is the mother of all living things as well as the owner of the oceans and seas.

- Colors: There are many roads to Yemayá, Okute, Asesú, Achabá and Mayelewo are some of them, and each one has a color combination having all blue as a common denominator.
- Ritual garment color: Blue.
- Ritual number: Seven.
- Ritual jewelry or necklace: Seven blue beads followed by seven crystalline beads.
- Ritual salutation: Omío Yemayá
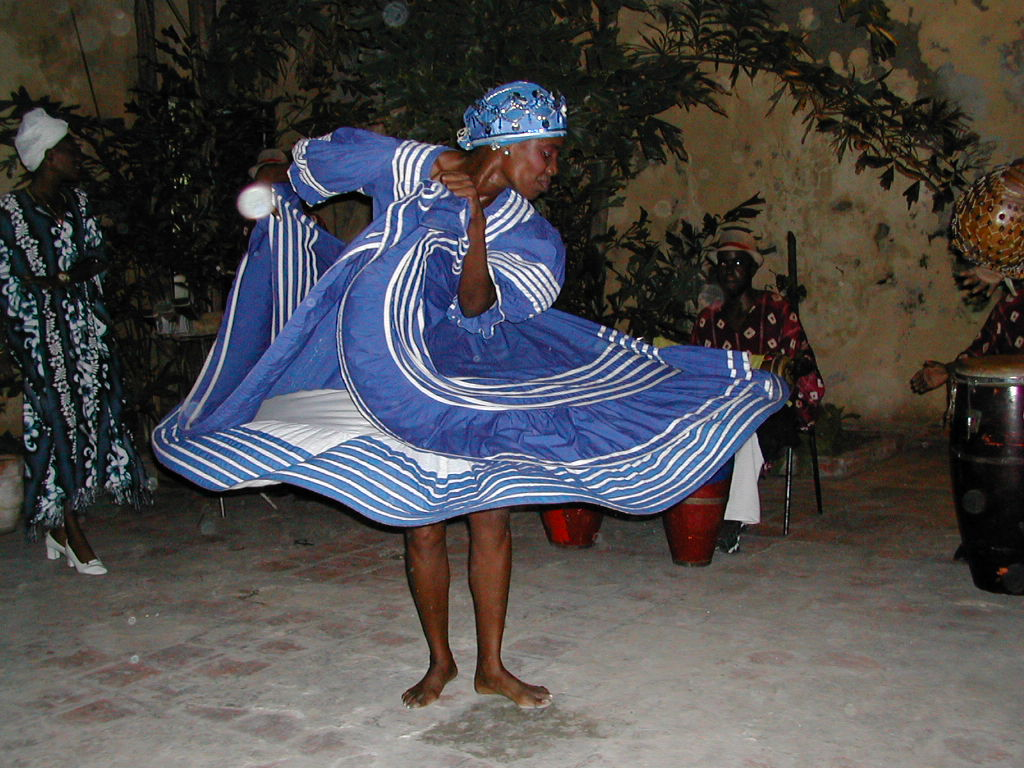
- A performer portraying Yemaya in Cuban dance.
  Symbols: Shells, sea stones, fish, fishnets, anchors, everything that pertains to the sea.

==== Ritual sacrifice ====
Ducks, roosters and rams.

==== Ritual foods or adimús ====
- Cane syrup, called melado in Spanish.
- Watermelon.
- Malarrabia, a Cuban dessert.
- Gofio, flour made from roasted grains.
- Pork rinds.

==== Festivals ====
- In Havana, Cuba, Yemayá is celebrated on 7 September. There is a procession in the municipality of Regla, home of Our Lady of Regla Church, which takes place around that date, which is a tradition that was initiated by slaves Cabildos and their descent, namely Susana Cantero -Omí Toké- and Pepa Herrera -Echu Bí-.
- It is common for regla de ocha initiated priests and priestess to keep a vigil for Yemayá on September 6 which is called vísperas.

=== Uruguay ===
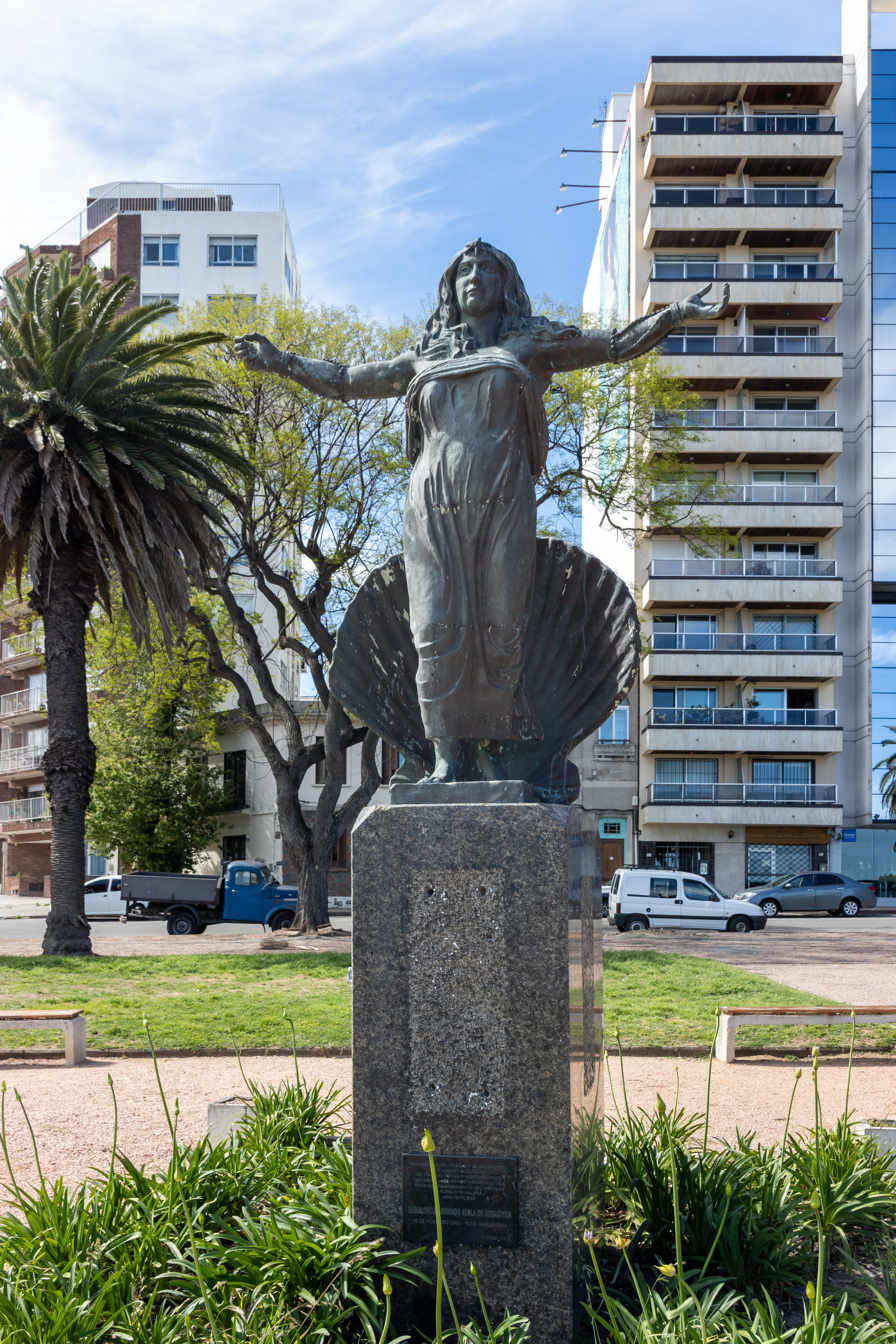
Statue of Iemanjá at Montevideo, Uruguay.

In Montevideo, worshippers gather on Ramírez Beach in the Parque Rodó neighborhood every February 2 to celebrate Iemanjá Day. Hundreds of thousands sit waiting for the sunset before they launch small boats with offerings into the ocean.

In 2015, the Uruguayan government estimated that 100,000 people had visited the beach for the celebrations.

== In popular culture ==
- In Smite, Yemoja is a playable character, part of the Yoruba pantheon.
- In the fifth episode of the third season of American Gods, Bilquis is enlightened by Yemoja.
- In Ishmael Reed's Mumbo Jumbo, the character Earline is supposedly possessed by Yemanjá.
- On his album Phantom Navigator (1987), saxophonist Wayne Shorter recorded a track titled "Yamanja".
- In the CD by the Bobby Sanabria Big Band, Afro-Cuban Dream: Live & In Clave!!! (2000), the song "Olokun" is dedicated to the violent aspect of Yemaya who is chained down in the depths of the ocean and is suddenly awakened.
- During the Miss Universe 2016 beauty pageant, Miss Venezuela Mariam Habach wore a national costume entitled "Reina encantada del mar", inspired by the myth of Yemayá. The costume, which weighed more than 18 kilos and was made of 120 meters of organza with hundreds of pearls and crystals, was so huge that it hampered her movements and forced her to constantly kick her dress forward, to the point that she got stuck in the fabric and had to be assisted off stage.
- In the 2021 fantasy novel Skin of the Sea by Natasha Bowen, Yemoja is the creator of the Mami Wata.
- In the song "Think of You" by French-Cuban musical duo Ibeyi, the lyrics include mention of orishas Moyuba, Oshun, Shango and Yemaya. The song "Yemaya" by Alfredo Rodriguez and featuring Ibeyi is named after the spirit.
- In the 2021 play cullud wattah by Erika Dickerson-Despenza, character Reesee prays to the goddess Yemoja to help bring back clean water to their town of Flint, Michigan, during the Flint water crisis.

== See also ==
- Oṣun
- Olokun
- Yemowo
- Mami Wata
- List of Yoruba deities
