= Yewá =

Yoruba deity of death, chastity and decomposition

- Yewa River; Purity; Decomposition; Dreams; Chastity; Death; Cemeteries; Modesty
- Member of the Orisha
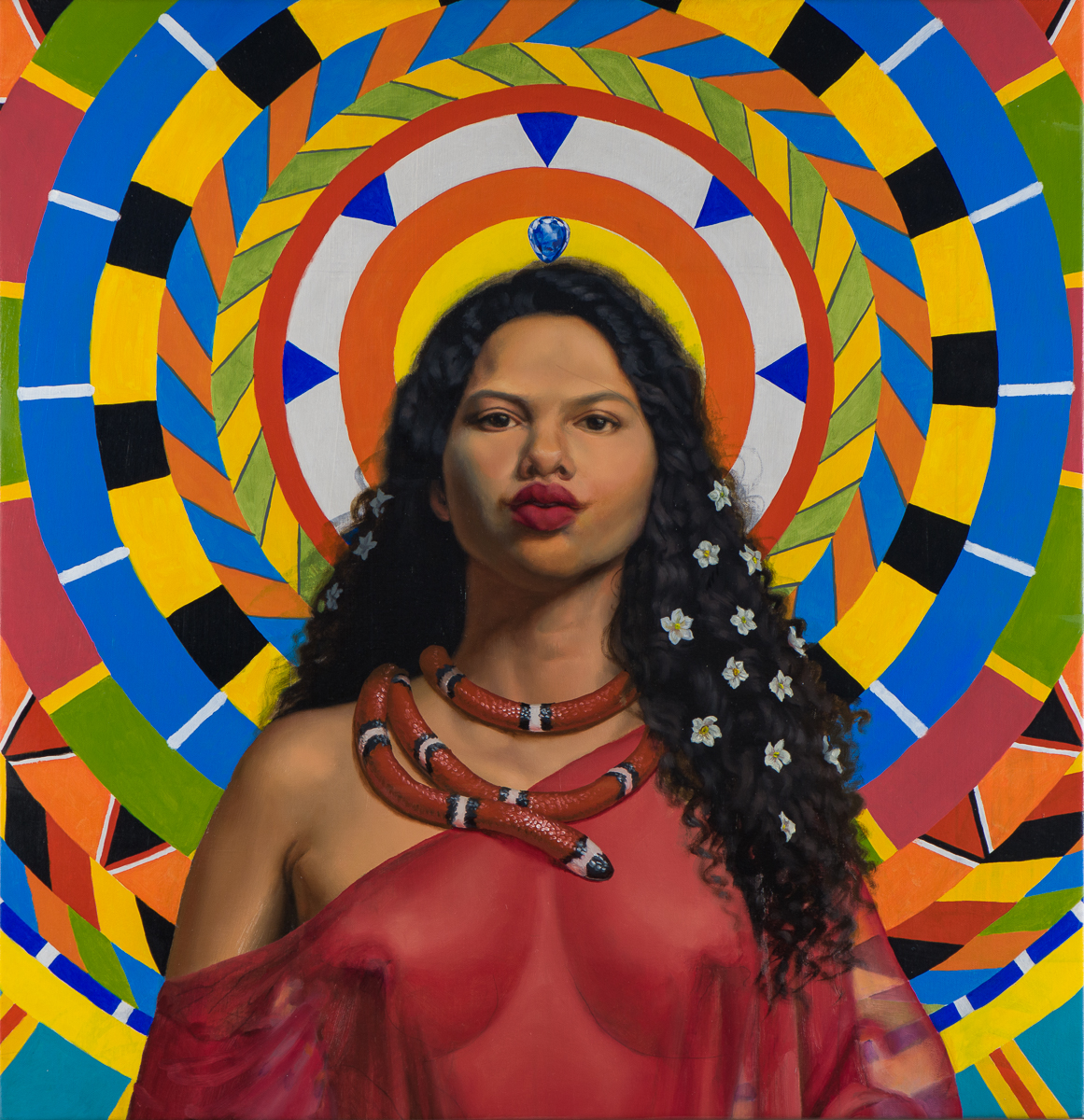
- Ewá by Marcelo Jorge
- Other names: Ewá, Iyewa, Iyawa
- Venerated in: Yoruba religion, Santería, Candomblé
- Animals: Snake
- Symbols: Ofá (spear or harpoon), bow and arrow, scepter with tail hair of a bull or buffalo, curved dagger, palm leaf fan
- Color: Pink, coral, red, white
- Region: Nigeria, Benin, Latin America, Cuba
- Ethnic group: Yoruba people

Genealogy
- Parents: Ọbatala (father)

Yewá (Yorùbá: Yewá, also called Ewá, Iyewa, or Iyawa, lit. 'Our Mother') is an Orisha of death, dreams, purity, chastity, decomposition and the Yewa River in the Yoruba religion and other syncretic religions.
