= Ayé =

Physical world in Yoruba cosmology

Ayé (Yoruba: Ayé, lit. 'life' or 'earth') is the personification of the Earth or the physical realm and an oriṣa in Yoruba religion. As the physical realm, it is also referred to as Ile Ayé or Ikole Ayé. It is believed to have been created by Ọbatala, the King of the oriṣa, who descended from the spirit realm, Ọrun, following directions from the Supreme Being Olodumare.

== See also ==
- Ọrun
- Yoruba cosmology
- Babalú-Ayé
