= Ọsanyìn =

Deity in the Yoruba religion

- Herb, Plant, Matter, Nature, Herbalist, Magic, Civilization, Enlightenment
- Member of Orisha
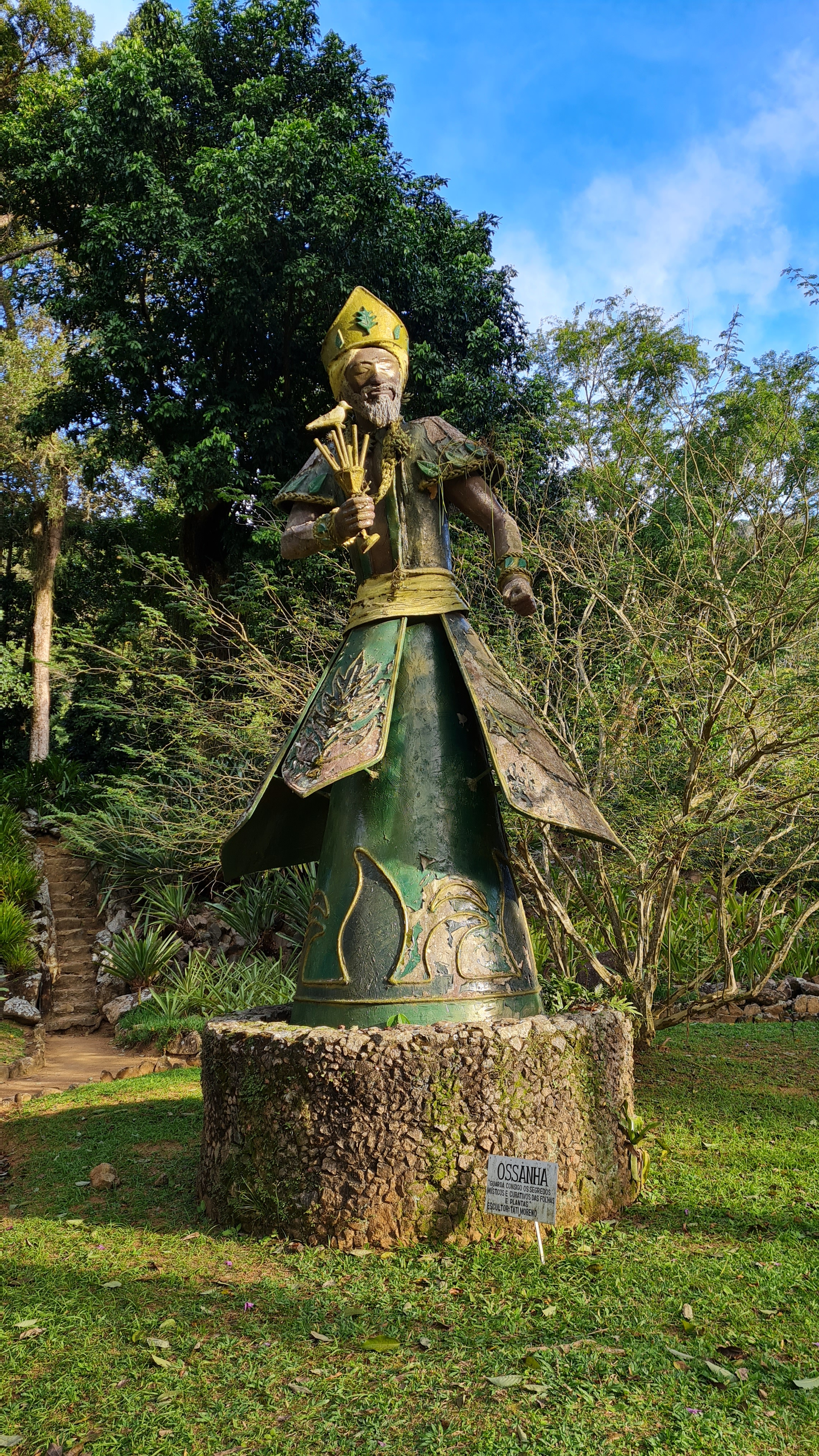
- Other names: Osanyin, Ossanha, Ossanhe, Ossain, Ozain
- Venerated in: Yoruba religion, Umbanda, Candomble, Santeria, Haitian Vodou, Folk Catholicism
- Abodes: Forest and Air
- World: Yorubaland
- Weapon: Osanyin staff
- Animals: Bird
- Symbol: Leaf, Herb
- Adherents: Oniṣegun
- Color: Green
- Mount: Ekiti Mountain
- Gender: Male
- Region: Nigeria, Benin, Latin America
- Ethnic group: Yoruba
- Associated deities: Ọrunmila
- Consort: Aroni, Aja

Ọsanyin (Yoruba pronunciation: [ɔ̀.sã̄.jĩ̀] rendered Osaín/Ossain/Ossaím in Latin America and known as Age (Ague) in Fon, is the orisha who has the omniscient knowledge of leaf, herb and matter. He is also known for healing, displaying magic, creating technological tools, and is popularly considered a herbalist, magician, and technologist. He is the creator of the concept of Oniṣegun, and is strongly associated with birds.

Ọsanyin is believed to be a powerful wizard and master of all spells and crafts found in the wild and untamed areas of nature. In the Americas, he is syncretized with Saint Joseph. Ọsanyin is described as embodying the features of leaf and herb, representing healing, curse, magic, knowledge, and many other attributes found within leaf and herb.

== Objects ==
According to a quote of the Odu Ifa, there are sixteen different styles of the wrought iron staff of Osanyin. One kind carries only one bird at its summit; another, two; yet another, three; and so forth — until the staff that carries sixteen birds is reached. The last is the most prestigious

== Ventriloquism ==
Ventriloquism or 'voice throwing' through effigies that "vocalize" in tiny squeaky voices as well as bird imagery are common features of the activities associated with Osanyin related practices. Certain groups in Yorubaland attribute this to the sound of the little birds that represent Osanyin.
