= Aṣẹ =

Yoruba religious concept

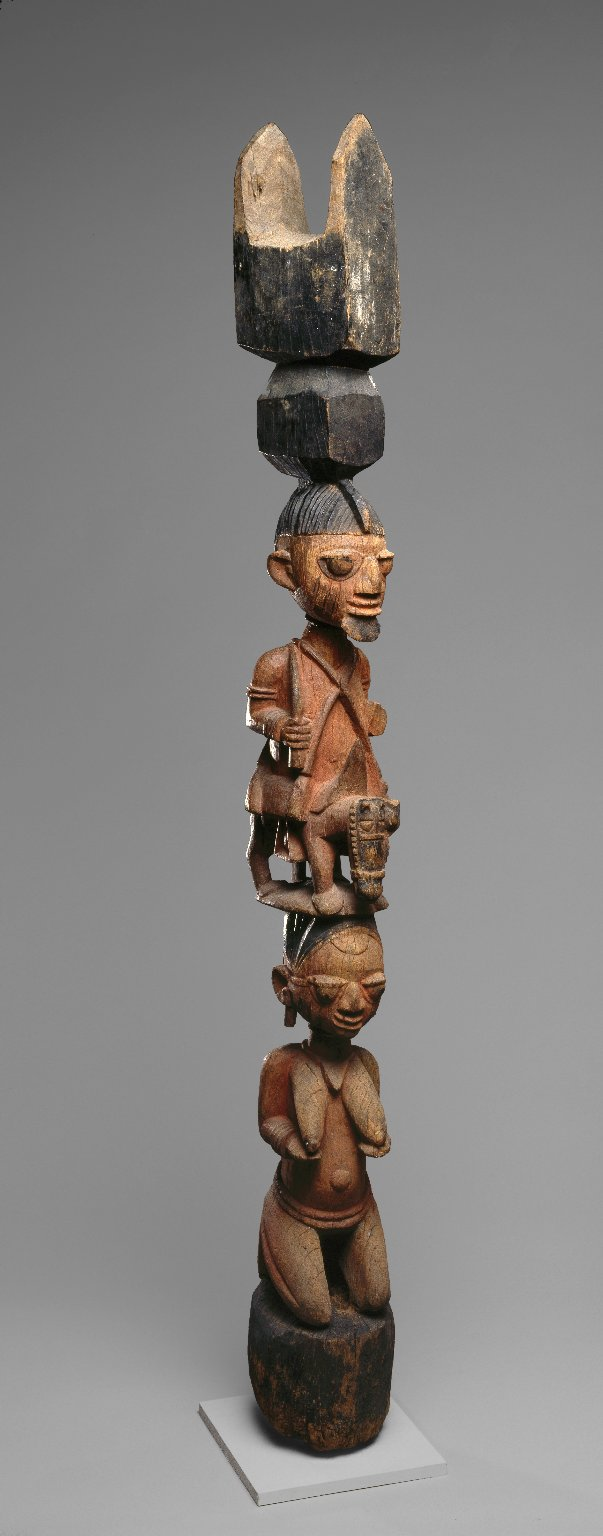
Yoruba veranda post, Brooklyn Museum

In Yoruba religion, aṣẹ, àṣẹ, aṣe, ase, or ashe is a postulated natural force or power that creates, catalyzes or facilitates change in the natural world depending on interpretation. It is believed to be given by Olódùmarè to everything — gods, ancestors, spirits, humans, animals, plants, rocks, rivers, and voiced words such as songs, prayers, praises, curses, or even everyday conversation. Existence, according to Yoruba thought, is dependent upon it.

In addition to its sacred characteristics, àṣẹ also has important social ramifications, reflected in its translation as "power, authority, command." A person who, through training, experience, and initiation, learns how to use the essential life force of things to willfully effect change is called an aláàṣẹ.

Rituals to invoke divine forces reflect this same concern for the autonomous ase of particular entities. The recognition of the uniqueness and autonomy of the ase of persons and gods is what structures society and its relationship with the other-world.

== Àṣẹ and Yoruba art ==
The concept of ashe influences how many of the Yoruba arts are composed. In the visual arts, a design may be segmented or seriate - a "discontinuous aggregate in which the units of the whole are discrete and share equal value with the other units." Such elements can be seen in Ifá trays, Iroke, and bowls, veranda posts, carved doors, and ancestral masks.

Regarding composition in Yoruba art as a reflection of the concept of àṣẹ , Drewal writes:

Units often have no prescribed order and are interchangeable. Attention to the discrete units of the whole produces a form which is multifocal, with shifts in perspective and proportion... Such compositions (whether representational or not) mirror a world order of structurally different yet autonomous elements. It is a formal means of organizing diverse powers, not only to acknowledge their autonomy but, more importantly, to evoke, invoke, and activate diverse forces, to marshal and bring them in to the phenomenal world. The significance of segmented composition in Yorùbá art can be appreciated if one understands that art and ritual are integral to each other.

== The head as the site of ase ==
The head, or orí, is vested with great importance in Yoruba art and thought. When portrayed in sculpture, the size of the head is often represented as four or five times its normal size in relation to the body in order to convey that it is the site of a person's ase as well as his or her essential nature, or iwa. The Yoruba distinguish between the exterior (òde) and inner (inú) head. òde is the physical appearance of a person, which may either mask or reveal one's inner (inú) aspects. Inner qualities, such as patience and self-control, should dominate outer ones.

The head also links the person with the other-world. The ìmorí ceremony (which translates to knowing-the-head) is the first rite that is performed after a Yoruba child is born. During imori, a diviner determines whether the child comes from his or her mother's or father's lineages or from a particular òrìṣà. If the latter is the case, then the child will undergo an orisa initiation during adulthood, during which the person's ori inu becomes the spiritual vessel for that òrìṣà's àṣẹ. To prepare for these ceremonies, the person's head is shaved, bathed and anointed.

== Various types of ase ==
- Máyẹhùn
- Àfọ̀ṣẹ
- Gbétùngbétùn
- Olúgbohùn

== Modern usage in the diaspora ==
Since at least the time of the Afrocentricity movement in the Anglophone diaspora during the late 20th century, the term "Àṣẹ" has become a relatively common term in the United States, with the general connotation being of affirmation and hopeful wishes. It has also come to be used in the Black Christian religious context as an equivalent (or replacement) of the word "Amen."

== In popular culture ==
- Actress Viola Davis formed a company called "Àṣẹ Audio" which signed a deal with Audible for podcast.

== See also ==
- Energy (esotericism)
- Qi
- Itutu
