= Iroke Ifá =

Yoruba ceremonial religious tool

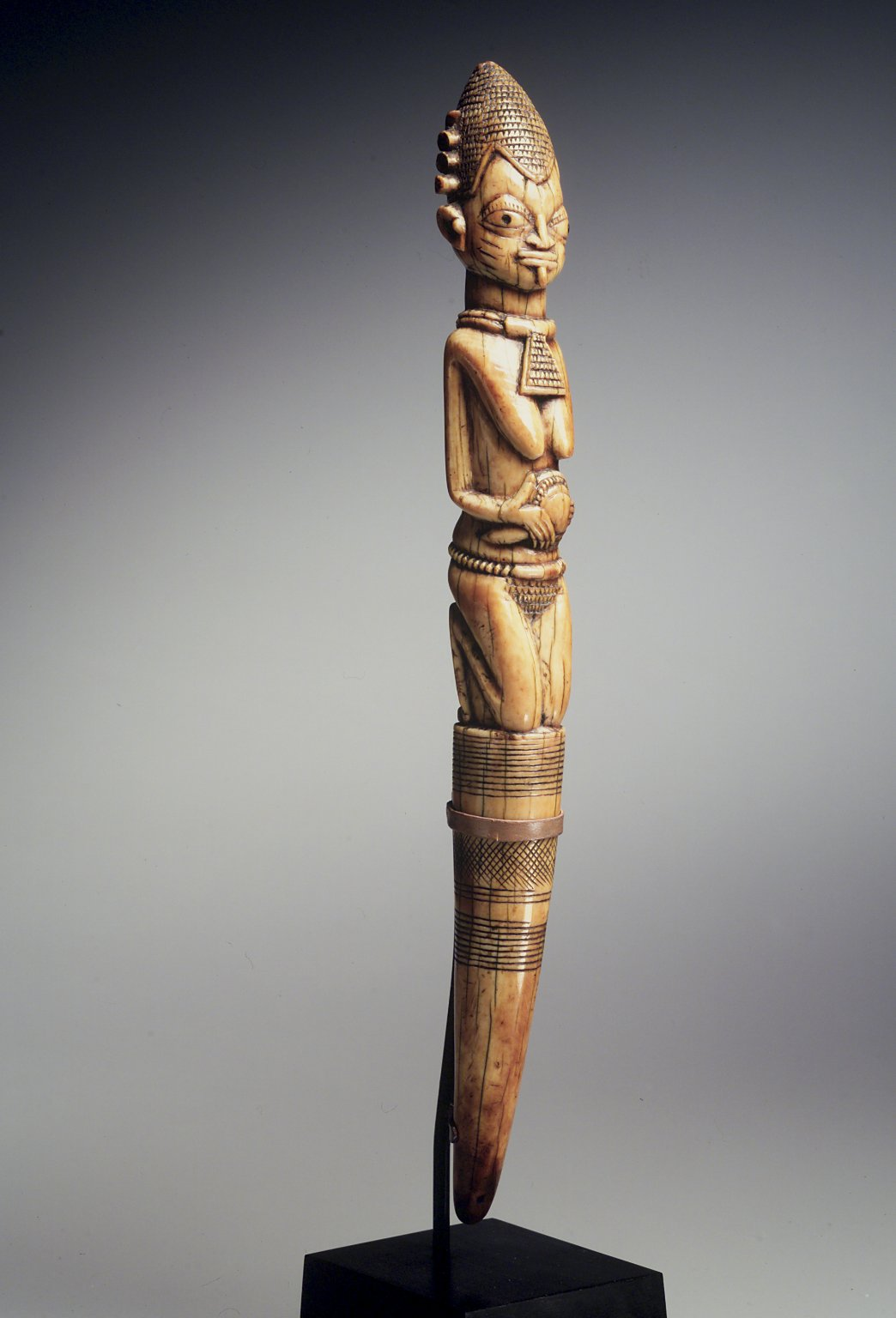
An 18th century Ivory Iroke Ifa from the collection of the Brooklyn Museum

The Iroke Ifá (Yoruba: ìrọ́kẹ́ Ifá) lit.: Ifa divination tapper, is a central ritual implement used by Babaláwo in the Ifá divination system of the Yoruba people.

== Ritual Functions ==
The Iroke Ifá is used at the start of a divination session to invoke Ọ̀rúnmìla, an Òrìṣà believed to know the secrets of the world and the prenatal destiny (Note: Àyànmọ́ - That which is affixed to one (Prenatal Destiny)) of every individual. Other Òrìṣà also receive salutations. The Babalawo taps the Iroke rhythmically against the edge of an Ọpọ́n Ifá (divination board), producing a sharp, percussive sound that is intended to keep the attention and participation of forces called into any issue at hand. This tapping also provides rhythmic accompaniment to the chants and recitations of Odù Ifá by the Babaláwo. Alongside the Opon Ifá, Ikin Ifá, and other Ifá items—the Iroke helps create a multisensory ritual environment that bridges the physical and spiritual worlds, enabling the Babalawo to interact with forces, diagnose problems, and prescribe solutions.

Beyond invocation, the Iroke acts as an insignia of the diviner's office and authority. Some are especially made for display rather than ritual use. They can be wrapped in beads and carried as a marker of identity and professional expertise.

== Design ==
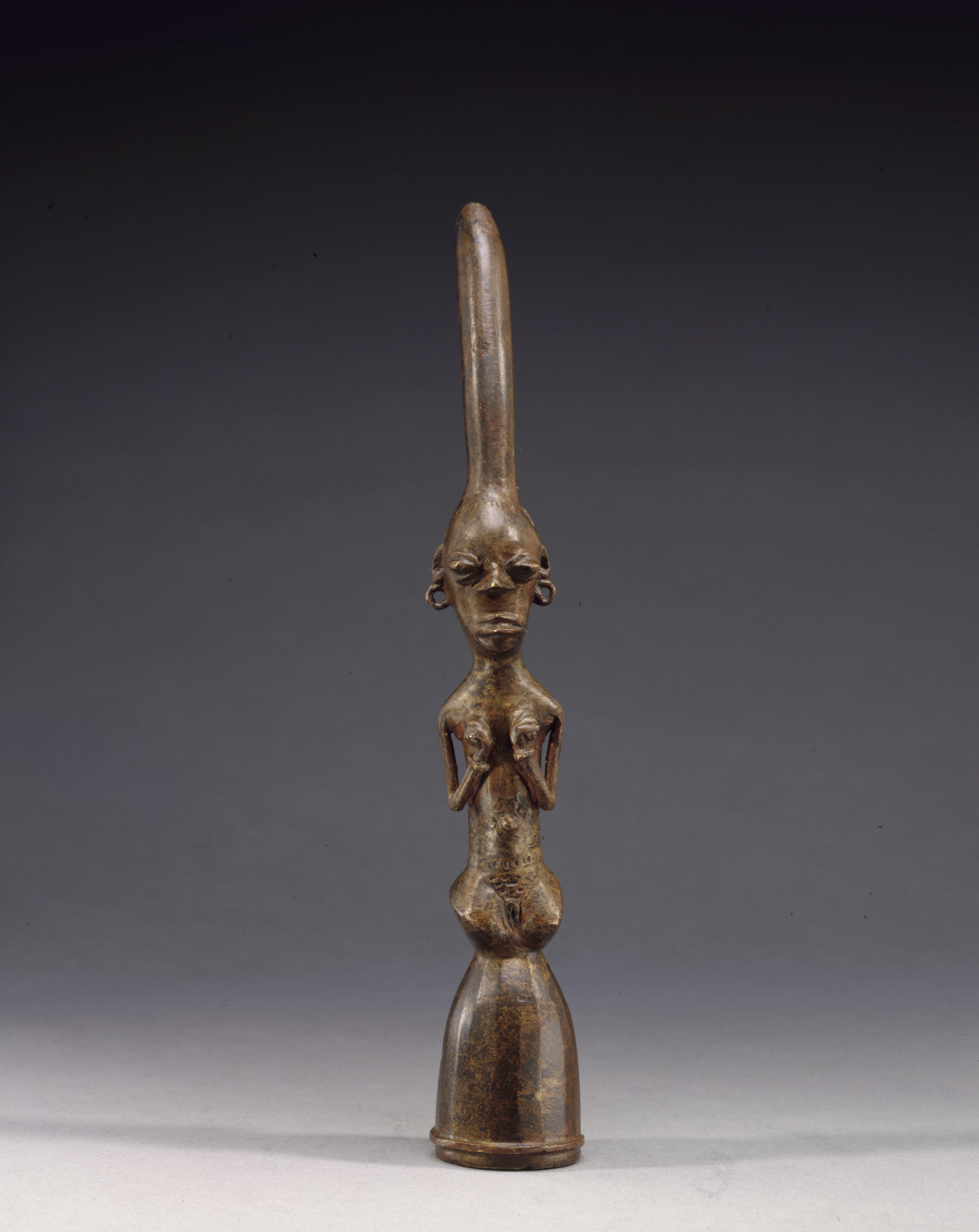
A Brass Iroke Ifa, capturing a female figure with her hands on her breasts, seated on a bell

An Iroke can range from 8 to 12 inches in length, and are often divided up into three parts, but there can be more or less. The topmost part which is the long pointed end, is generally without any intricate design. In the middle section, Yoruba carvers are at liberty to choose and decorate the object within a limited repertoire of images, the most common being either a human head or a nude kneeling female holding her breasts. The bottom doesn’t always have a subject matter but it often pairs to complete the image of the middle section, sometimes accompanied by a rattle bell.

=== Religious Symbolism ===
While forms vary, the topmost part of the typical 3 segmented design of the Iroke is said to symbolize the Ori. A protrusion rests atop a physical head in such a way that the head cannot see it. According to Art historian Rowland Abiodun, this creates a psychological distinction between the Ori ode (the visible head) and the Ori inu (the inner head) in which the idea of one’s inner destiny is conveyed by the long conical appendage. The attachment of the Ori inu to the Ori ode, here—represented by the union of segments—is therefore seen as the physical representation of a concept known as Àyànmọ́. This is the most important part of the Iroke, making it a standard for use in divination rituals.

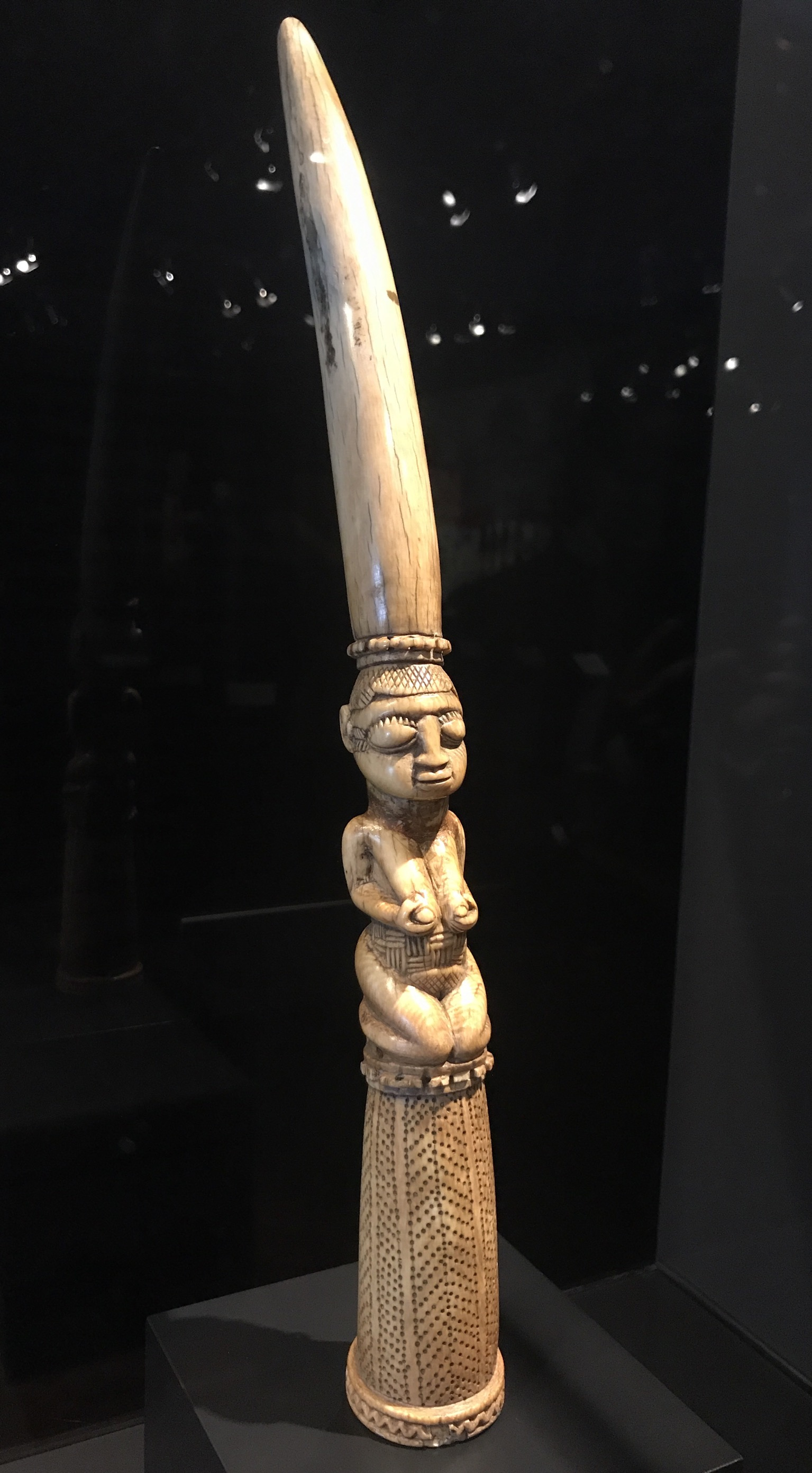
19th century Ivory Iroke Ifa

This arrangement also recalls a Traditional Yoruba myth on dealing with Àjàlá Mópìn, the great molder of Ori and assistant to Ọbàtálá in the Ọrun. The tradition holds that the choosing of the Ori is the most important event in the creation of a human before birth, and the kneeling position is seen as the most appropriate way to salute the Òrìṣà, who are also termed Àkúnlẹ̀bọ. (Note: Àkúnlẹ̀bọ (Orisa) - That which must be reverenced kneeling down) In the myth, another reference to Ori is Àkúnlẹ̀yan. (Note: Àkúnlẹ̀yan (Ori) - That which is chosen kneeling down)

Thus when Babalawo are using the Iroke to invite or salute numerous Oriṣa in a divination session—such as Olódùmarè (the Supreme Being), the alálẹ̀ (owners of the land), àwon àgbà (the elders), àwon baba ńlá (the progenitors), and various ancient Babalawo—the kneeling female figure, which is sometimes associated with the reverential state of Ikunle abiyamo, (Note: Ìkúnlẹ̀ Abiyamọ - The kneeling posture of a woman experiencing the pains of childbirth) is seen as a very effective iroke symbol for the invocation of their good will. Some sitting figures also have a bird on top of them, and the bird is said to represent the power and authority (Aṣẹ) of Orunmila.

While not as popular, designs also come with male figures. A kneeling hunter holds a bow and a crocodile in one example, others include the mounted warrior motif, which is intended to express dominance.

Artisans traditionally carve iroke Ifá from wood or ivory, though rarer examples exist in bronze or brass. Wood is more common and accessible, while ivory versions signify prestige and are highly valued for their luster. These materials are chosen not only for workability but also for their resonance, as the type and specie of material can alter the sound of the rattle.

Various Iroke Ifa

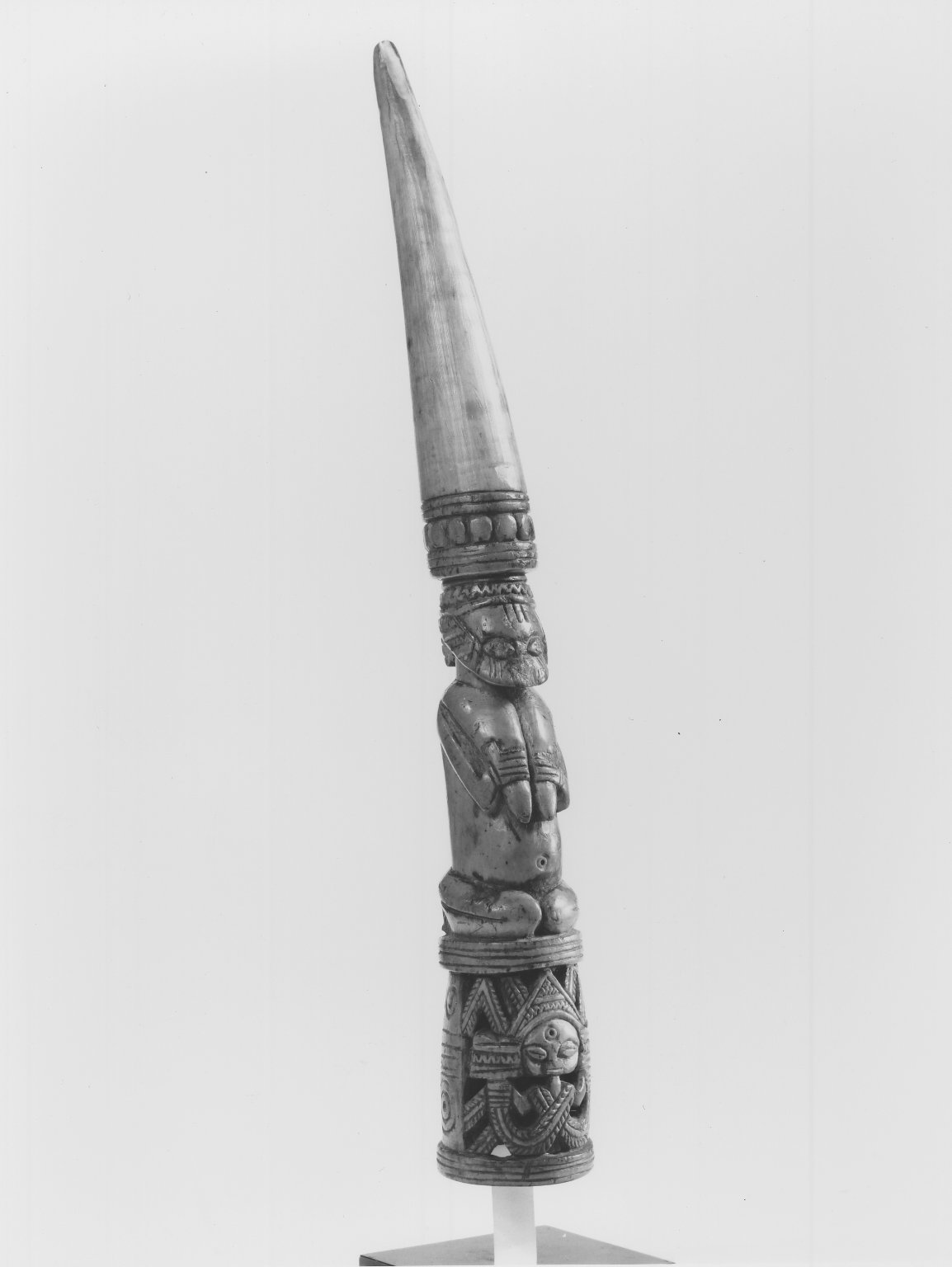

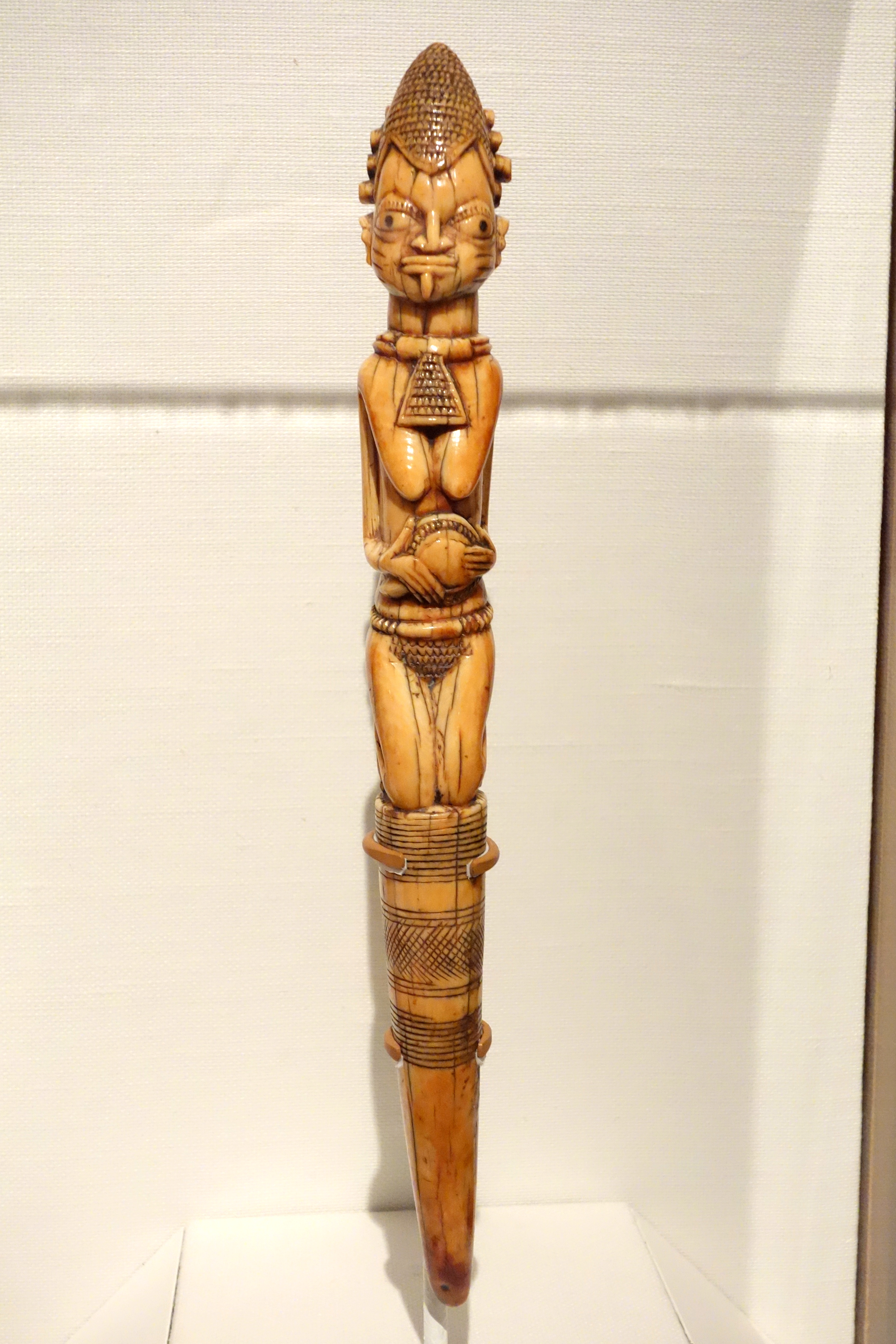

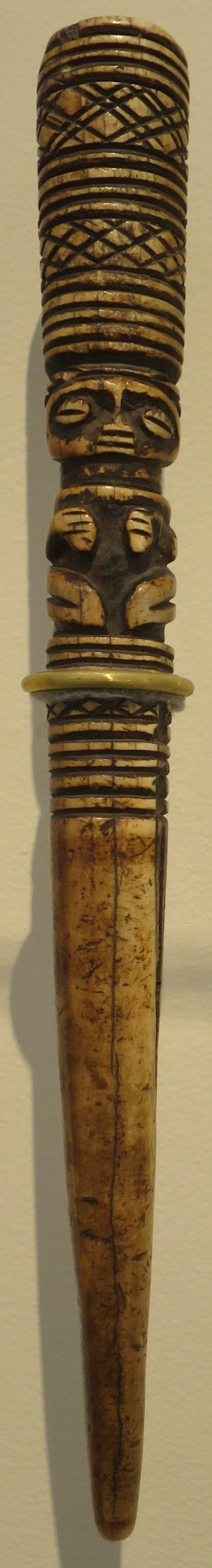

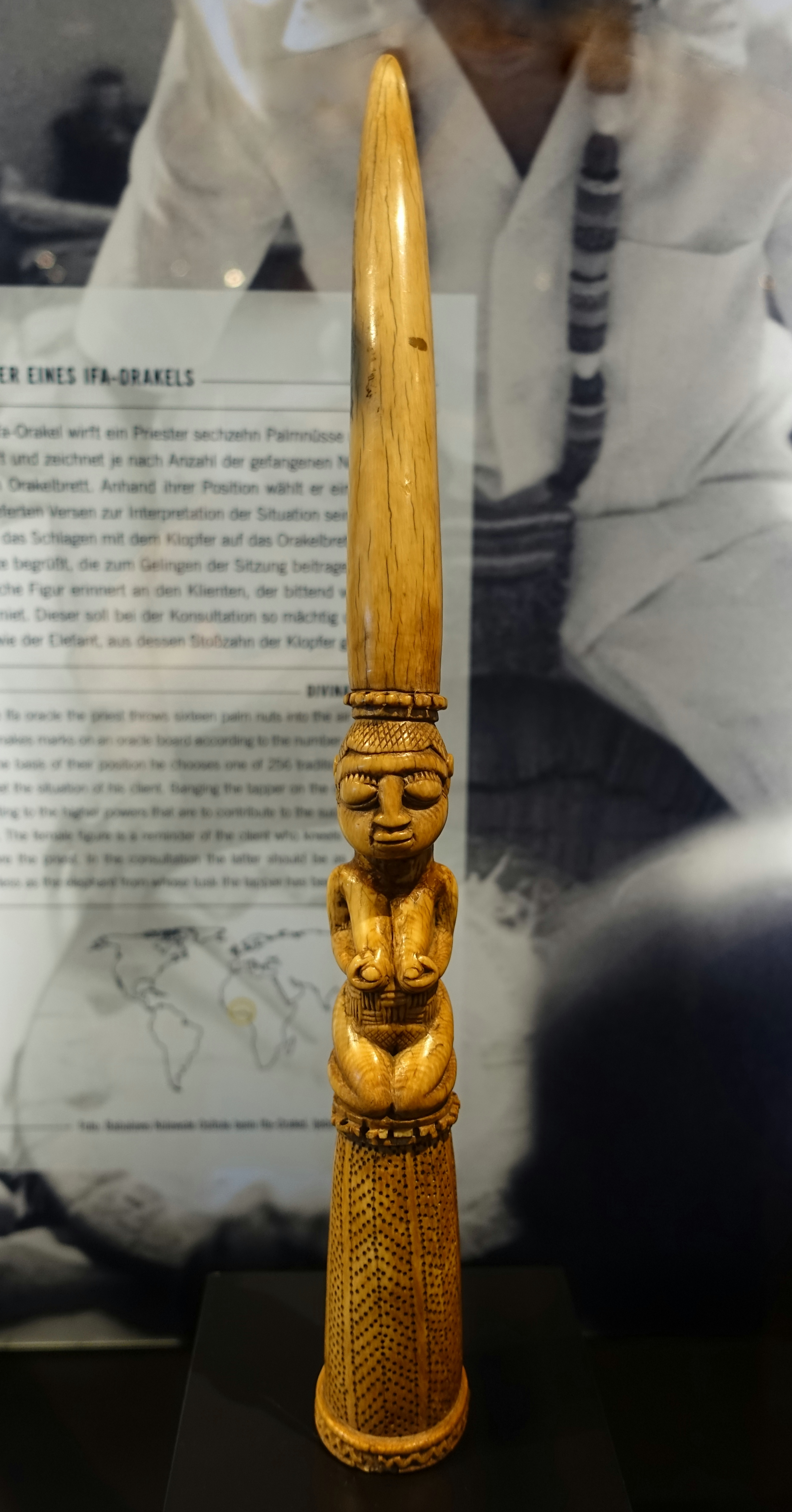

== See also ==
- Opon Ifá
- Odu Ifa
- Yoruba religion
- Divination
