= Iyami Aje =

Yoruba term of respect

Iyami Aje is a Yoruba term of respect and endearment used to describe a woman who is considered to be an ajẹ, a woman who wields myriad arcane biological, spiritual, and cosmic powers. The term Ìyá mi literally means "my mother" in the Yoruba language.

== Etymology ==
In Yoruba language, Ìyá mi literally means "my mother". In Yoruba cosmology, the mother's roles as the force of creation and the sustainer of life and existence elevates her to the realm of the divine. Consequently, Ìyá mi - with alterations in tones - becomes Ìyààmi or Ìyàmi, which can be translated as "the super-powerful ones" or "My Mysterious Mother." Àjẹ́ is a Yoruba word that signifies the biological and spiritual power of African women that has myriad potential, including but not limited to powers of elemental, biological and artistic creation; healing; destruction; spiritual and physical development and fortification; and political organization and empowerment. In The Architects of Existence: Àjẹ́ in Yoruba Cosmology, Ontology, and Orature, Teresa N. Washington defines àjẹ́ as "a force that is beyond definition, but English approximations for Àjẹ́ would be Power, Creation, Cosmos, All."

== Praise names ==
Iyami Aje are known by many praise names which include, but are not limited to, Iyami Osoronga, Awon Iya Wa (Our Mothers), Eleye (Owner(s) of the Sacred Bird), Iyanla, Awon Agbalagba (The Wise and Formidable Elders), Elders of the Night, Old and Wise One(s), the "Gods of Society," Ayé (Earth), Yewájọbí (The Mother of All the Òrìṣà and All Living Things), and Àjẹ́, as the latter term signifies both the power and the individual wielding it.

== Description ==
In Yoruba cosmology, the orisha Odù is the creator of the universe and all that thrives within it. She is the originator of existence and the womb of all origins: Yoruba spiritualist Samuel M. Opeola states, "Àjẹ́ actually is Odù." African women, the direct biological and spiritual progeny of Odù, are said to all inherently bear various aspects of her signature force: àjẹ́. Àjẹ́ is primarily associated with women because of their essential roles in conceiving, carrying, birthing, and nurturing children; however, African men, including African gods, can also have and be àjẹ́. Opeola states that "any Òrìṣà regarded [as essential] in creation, childbirth, protection of a town also possesses the power of Àjé" (including Ọbàtálá, Ọbalúayé, Ògún, to name a few orisha). However, with its origins cosmically in Odù, the womb of existence, and biologically in the menstruating, conceiving, birthing wombs of existence, African women are the owners and controllers of àje.

Because of its scope and power, àje is feared and revered by many. Àje has been translatied as "witch," but in a 1958 article Ulli Beier disputed this translation, saying that it was not an "accurate translation of Aje since Aje 'represents rather the mystic powers of womanhood in their more dangerous destructive aspect.'" Henry and Margaret Drewal wrote, "Any elderly woman, her longevity implying secret knowledge and power, may be regarded as an aje, as are all who hold important titles in cults for the gods and ancestors. The feeling is that in order to fulfill her role properly she must possess such power." Using the term "witch" is especially dangerous because in many African communities the accused can be ostracized or lynched because of false accusations. Ayo Adeduntan's article, "Calling Àjẹ́ Witch In Order To Hang Her: Yoruba Patriarchal Definition and Redefinition of Female Power," analyzes the impact of the misuse of the term witch in Yoruba societies and the necessary usage of culturally appropriate and accurate Yoruba terms. In some cases, to protect the bearers of power and avoid confusion, terms such as "Elders of the Night," Ayé, and Awon Iya Wa may be used euphemistically.

== History ==
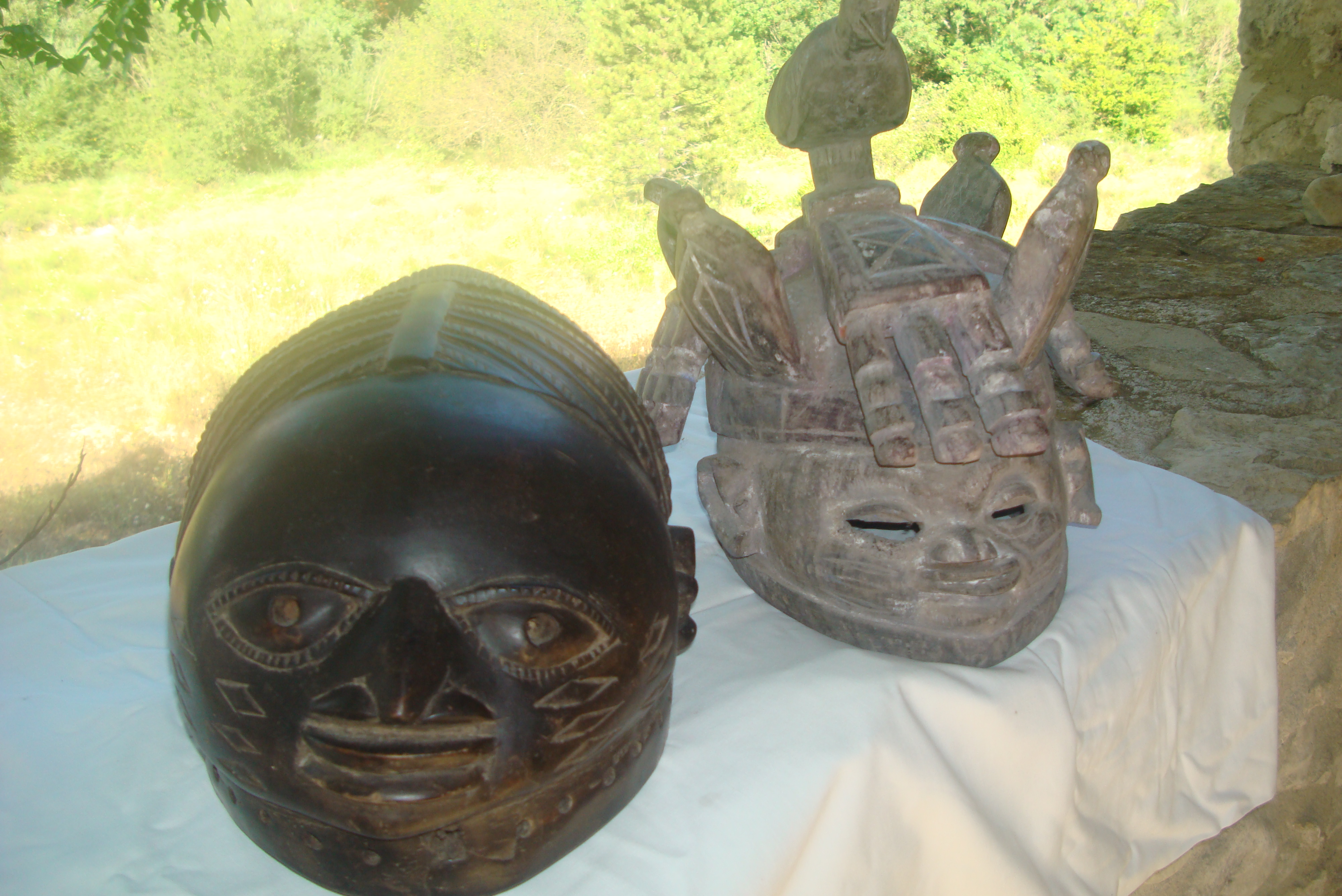
Gelede Mask

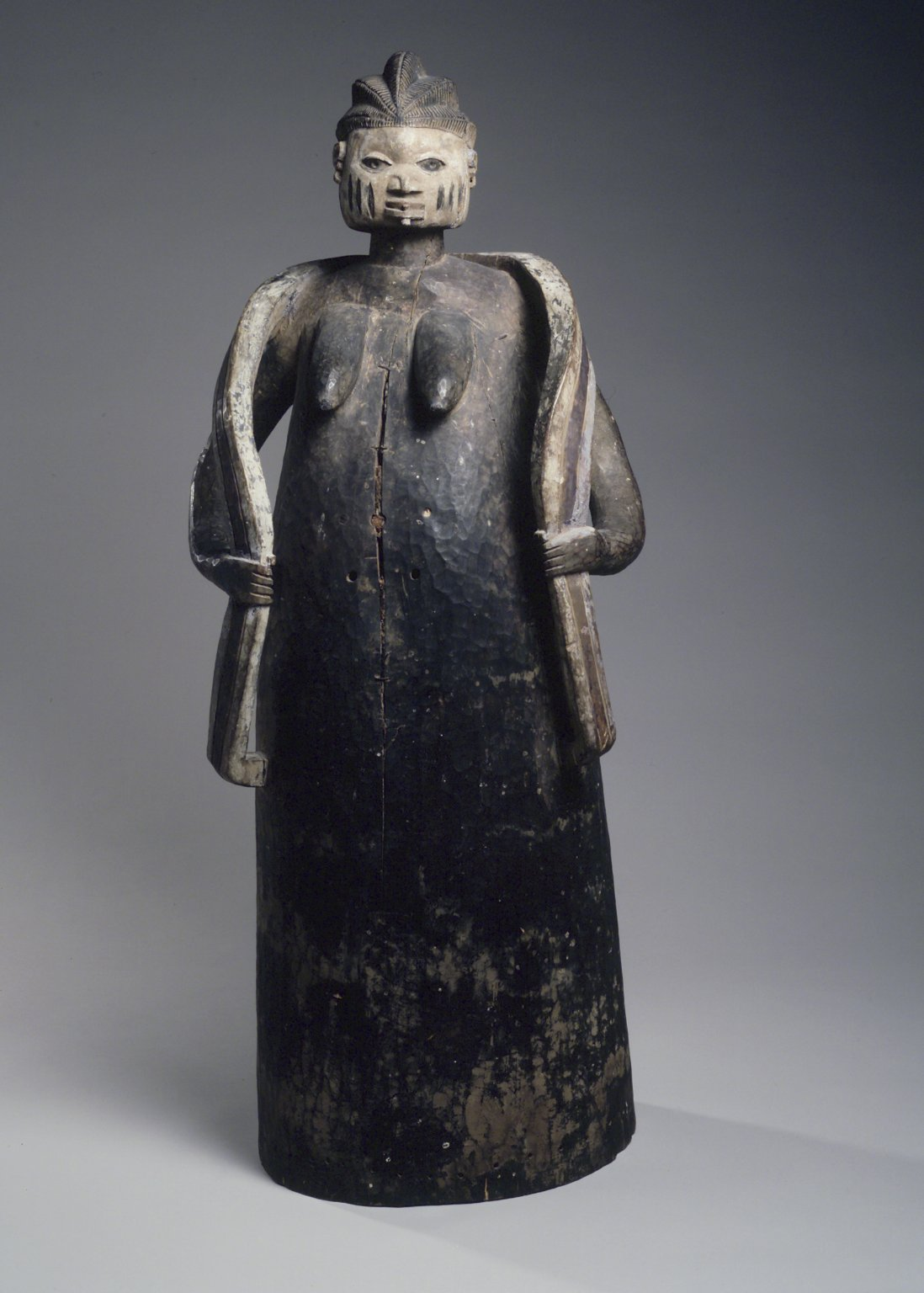
Iya Nla Gelede

The history of àje begins with existence. The gods who are synonymous with àje are Odù and Odùduwà, and in Olodumare: God in Yoruba Belief, E. Bolaji Idowu defines Odùduwà as the "self-existent . . .Chief who created being. In his article "The Spider, the Chameleon and the Creation of the Earth," Oduyoye finds that Odùduwà means "oracular utterance created existence." In The Architects of Existence: Aje in Yoruba Cosmology, Ontology, and Orature, Teresa N. Washington states that "as the galactic Mother of All, Odù is logically the source of all ìwà (identity, character, existence) which finds its origin and apex in the undiluted power of pure cosmic darkness (Dúdú)." Washington defines the meaning of Odùduwà, as "The Immense Womb or Pot (Odù) of Infinite Depths and Darkness (Dúdú) that contains all Attributes, Characteristics, and Identities."

Àje is an ancient force that predates the concepts of "Yoruba" and "Ifa" by millennia; however, the Odu Ifa also include various texts about àje. The men failed and it was only when they included Ọṣun that the world could be formed. In as ese Ifa of Osa Meji Odu or Oduduwa is the only female among three other male divinities and being given the power of motherhood and Aje by Olodumare, which carries inherent power that must be respected. Other origin texts suggest that Yemoja is the leader of Iyami as well as the founder and owner of Gelede, a society devoted to Iyami.

While the town of Ota, Nigeria is the town most readily associated with àje, Àje has always flourished in Africa and in the lands of the diaspora to which the Yoruba traveled either by their own volition or as victims of slavery. Àje are known to preside over the market, and the iyalode serves as the head of commerce and business in most Yoruba towns and cities. Iyami Àje also continue to occupy essential positions of power in Yoruba sacred societies and political institutions.

Iyami became demonized as more patriarchal regimes came into power under Abrahamic faiths, causing many to go into secrecy to avoid persecution and possible death. The influx of Abrahamic faiths and the European witch-hunts of Europe during the 1700s coincided with the influx of Islamic and Christian colonialism and the slave trade in West Africa. Traditional ceremonies once performed by women became the domain of men; in some cases, rulers prohibited women from attending festivals to ensure that they would not participate.

The Gelede festivals helped to ensure the reverence and praise of Iyami Àje would not be vanquished or silenced. During these festivals, entire communities gather to thank and praise the Iyami Aje for their protection and support of the community. The Gelede festival reveres Iyami as gods and ancestral mothers, and one of the most heralded aspects of Iyami Àje in Gelede is Iyami Osoronga, who is also honored as Iya Nla (Great Mother), and is represented by a white mask during the Gelede festival. According to Babatunde Lawal in The Gelede Spectacle, Iya Nla is Yewajobi, Iyami Iya (The Mother of All and the Mother of Mothers).

== Principles, functions, and roles ==
Samuel M. Opeola states that àjẹ́ is rooted in three primary principles:

1. Do not dabble in herbalism (do not use herbs without thorough knowledge of their nature, use and divine authorization).
2. Do not display wealth.
3. Share everything.

Opeola asserts that àjẹ́ are "against class systems" and "exploitation." From a position rooted in acknowledgement of equality, Àjẹ́ work to ensure societal, political, and cultural balance and harmony. One of the many praise names for the àjẹ́ collective is Ẹgbẹ́ Ọ̀gbà, which means "a collective of equals."

That àjẹ́ is rooted in equality illustrates key differences between contemporary Yoruba ontology and that of the autochthonic inhabitants of Ile-Ife. The aboriginal inhabitants of Ile-Ife distinguished themselves from their Yoruba migrant-guests by calling themselves Onímọlẹ̀, which means "owner of the land." The Onímọlẹ̀ (also known as Imọlẹ̀ and Mọlẹ̀) way of life was grounded and structured by àjẹ́, balance, and reciprocity rather than the hierarchical stratification and ritual obeisance for which many African cultures, including that of the contemporary Yoruba, are known. In The Architects of Existence, Teresa N. Washington discusses the significance of Ẹgbẹ́ Ọ̀gbà worldview on what is known today as the Yoruba culture:

Ẹgbẹ́ Ọ̀gbà also appears to signify the original Mọlẹ̀ way of life and worldview which are rooted in egalitarianism. The significance of social equality is evident in the founding of Ògbóni, in which all members of the nation, without distinction, were collectively initiated; in the rules that Àjẹ́ must "share everything" and must not engage in displays of wealth; in the edict that babaláwo are in service to their communities and cannot use their [spiritual] gifts to generate personal wealth; and in the monarchical façade that shields the careful labors of an intricately interconnected network of Àjẹ́-rich power wielders. The Mother-son dynamic of Àjẹ́ also signifies egalitarianism, because Mother has milk, love, and protection for all of her offspring, and all of her progeny, ọmọ Onílẹ̀, are working for the fortification and glorification of Onílẹ̀, who fortifies and glorifies humanity.

Because of the millennia-long interweaving of the two cultures—Onimole and Yoruba—some laypersons have assumed that Àjẹ́ is structured hierarchically in ways similar to Yoruba culture, but that is not the case. There are no priests or priestesses of Àj̣ẹ́, no "godmothers" and "godfathers" of Àj̣ẹ́, and there is no color-coded hierarchy within Àjẹ́. Yoruba cultural historians Bade Ajuwon and Samuel M. Opeola confirm that before the colonization of Africa, with its attendant racism and religious hypocrisy, there was no concept of hierarchically tiered "white," (funfun) "red," (pupa) or "black" (dudu) Àjẹ́. Washington finds that the concept of color-coded Àjẹ́ was created and used by people and organizations to protect themselves from racist religious and political persecution.

Àjẹ́ is considered to be a genetic, biological, and spiritual endowment that manifests itself uniquely in each of its bearers not unlike an individual's orí (destiny), àṣẹ (personal spiritual authority), and ìwà (existence, character). Consequently, Àjẹ́ work together, as a collective, to learn, teach, evolve, expand, and restructure on personal and communal levels. The work of àjẹ́ is that which fortifies the lives of community members and strengthens society as a whole. They are the gynecologists, obstetricians, general practitioners, counselors, psychologists, diviners, physicists, mathematicians, architects, scientists, navigators, and agriculturalists of their communities. However, the role they are most feared for is that of enforcer of justice. This is undertaken by a collective (ẹgbẹ́) that includes members of Ògbóni, a Yoruba sacred society of elders intricately connected with àjẹ́, and Oṣó, empowered males who may or may not have àjẹ́. Oṣó are described as the "husbands of Àjé." Àjẹ́, Ògbóni, and Oṣó have been described as "partners of progress," and their individual and collective works are all overseen by Ẹdan, the Orisa of justice, whose eyes never close and, thus, bear witness to everything, and Onílẹ̀, the Owner of the Earth or the Mother of the Earth, who is also known as Ayé. The fact that àjẹ́ are also known as Ayé, Earth, highlights the seamless nature of the mothers' cosmic and terrestrial interrelationships. Because of the seriousness of the Ẹgbẹ́ Àjẹ́'s work, the secrecy and silence that shields the Ẹgbẹ́, and the formidable checks and balances that ensure the accurate dispensation of justice, Yoruba historian and artist Adebayo Faleti describes Àjẹ́ as "the most disciplined cult in the world.

Àjẹ́ cannot be bought, sold or commodified. Similarly, the Ẹgbẹ́ Àjẹ́, a timeless consortium with unimaginably deep responsibilities, does not publicize, solicit, recruit, or advertise: it is necessarily both a secret and a sacred society. It is described as being at once invisible and ubiquitous. In Ìgbàgbọ́ àti Ẹ̀sìn Yorùbá, C. L. Adeoye states that the Ẹgbẹ́'s members take their work so seriously that they all adhere to the following diktat: "That the eyes should see / That the ears should hear / That the mouth should be silent."

== Additional attributes ==
Like mother gods in other cultures, they have a triune function as creators, sustainers, and destroyers of life. Historically the role of resurrecting the dead to determine cause of death when it was in question was assigned to them.

Because of the relationship to Mother Earth, Iyami Àje are also known for their extensive use of natural resources such as herbs and animals for healing and empowerment. All birds especially owls, vultures, and parrots (particularly the African Grey) are associated with Iyami.

== Community perceptions ==
While àje is largely associated with women and female gods, Opeola's revelation that "any Òrìṣà regarded [as essential] in creation, childbirth or the protection of a town also possesses the power of Àjé" makes it clear that it is vital for certain men - divine and terrestrial - to have àje. Indeed, Washington and Opeola concur that "to undertake certain duties and fulfill certain roles, certain males must have Àjẹ́." The significance and ubiquity of àje in the Yoruba world is such that a common Yoruba saying observes, "You have Aje; I have Aje; We all have Aje in our pockets." This acknowledgement of a communal inheritance of a power that is diverse and as unique as each individual bearer is what prompts Olatubosun Oladapo, a renowned Yoruba poet and lyricist who is known as Odídẹrẹ́ Ayékòótọ́ (or the sacred grey parrot of Àjẹ́), to ask of his audience in one of his verses, "Emi Lo Ó Máa Fàjẹ́ẹ̀ Rẹ Ṣe? (What Will You Do With Your Own Àjẹ́?)."

The book, Iyanifa: Women of Wisdom notes that the contradiction of suggesting no one can initiate or claim to have been initiated while simultaneously saying only Iyami can initiate demonstrates the fallacy of the statement itself. In his book Invisible Powers of the Metaphysical World, Araba Yemi Elebuibon asserts that initiations do occur. Some initiatory processes are also explained in the Ifa Literary Corpus under the odu Osa Meji where the Iyalode initiates women of the town.

== See also ==
- Gẹlẹdẹ – Yoruba artistic public display spectacle
- Iyalawo – Traditional Yoruba priestess
- Iya Nla – Deity in Yoruba cosmology
- Mami Wata – African water spirit
- Olokun – Orisha of the deep sea in the Yoruba religion
- Oshun – Yoruba orisha
- Oya – Orisha in the Yorùbá religion
- Yemoja – Major water Orisha in the Yoruba religion
