= Itadogun =

Sacred day in Yoruba religion

Itadogun (Yoruba: Ìtàdógún, lit. 'seventeenth day') is sacred day of worship and communal divination in the Yoruba religion. It is observed every seventeen days and involves prayer, worship, sacrificial offerings, singing and dancing, recitation of Odu Ifá verses and other practices dedicated to the Orisha, especially the deity of wisdom Ọrunmila.
