= Ọrunmila =

Major deity in the Yoruba religion

- Wisdom; Knowledge; Divination; Philosophy; Fate; Destiny; Prophecy; Civilization; Enlightenment
- Member of Irunmọlẹ
- Àgéré Ifá (Ifá divination vessel)
- Other names: Orunmila; Orunmilá; Orúnla; Orúla; Agbonniregun; Ifá
- Venerated in: Yoruba religion, Umbanda, Candomble, Santeria, Haitian Vodou, Folk Catholicism
- World: Yorubaland
- Weapon: None (Note: Ọrunmila does not wield physical weapons but rather spiritual tools such as the Opele that contain aspects of his power.)
- Artifacts: Opon Ifá; Iroke Ifá; Opele Ifá; Agere Ifá
- Symbol: Cowries; Seeds; Kolanut; Odu Ifá
- Adherents: Babalawo; Iyalawo
- Day: The third day of the Kọjọda week; Itadogun
- Color: Green, Yellow, White
- Gender: Male
- Region: Nigeria, Benin, Latin America
- Ethnic group: Yoruba
- Festivals: World Ifá Festival; Ọrunmila Festival
- Associated deities: Ọsanyìn
- Parents: Alayeru and Oroko (Earthly)

Ọrunmila (Yoruba: Ọ̀rúnmìlà, also Ọrúnla or Orúla in Latin America) is one of the most principal deities in the Yoruba religion, venerated as the Orisha of wisdom, knowledge, fate, prophecy, enlightenment, and divination. He is believed to be the creator of the Ifá system.

== Historical and literary sources ==
Following the categories developed by the Nigerian scholar Peju Yemaje, Orunmila is recognized as a primordial Orisha, an Irunmọlẹ, one that existed before the creation of humanity and resides in Ọrun.

Equivocally, he is praised as "Igbákejì Olódùmarè" (second in command to Olodumare) and "Ẹlẹ́rìí ìpín" (witness of fate). Priests of Ifá are known as babalawos and Priestesses of Ifá are known as iyanifas.

Orunmila is considered a sage, recognizing that Olodumare placed Ori (intuitive knowledge) in him as a prime Orisha. It is Ori who can intercede and affect the reality of a person much more than any other Orisha.

== Priesthood and initiation ==
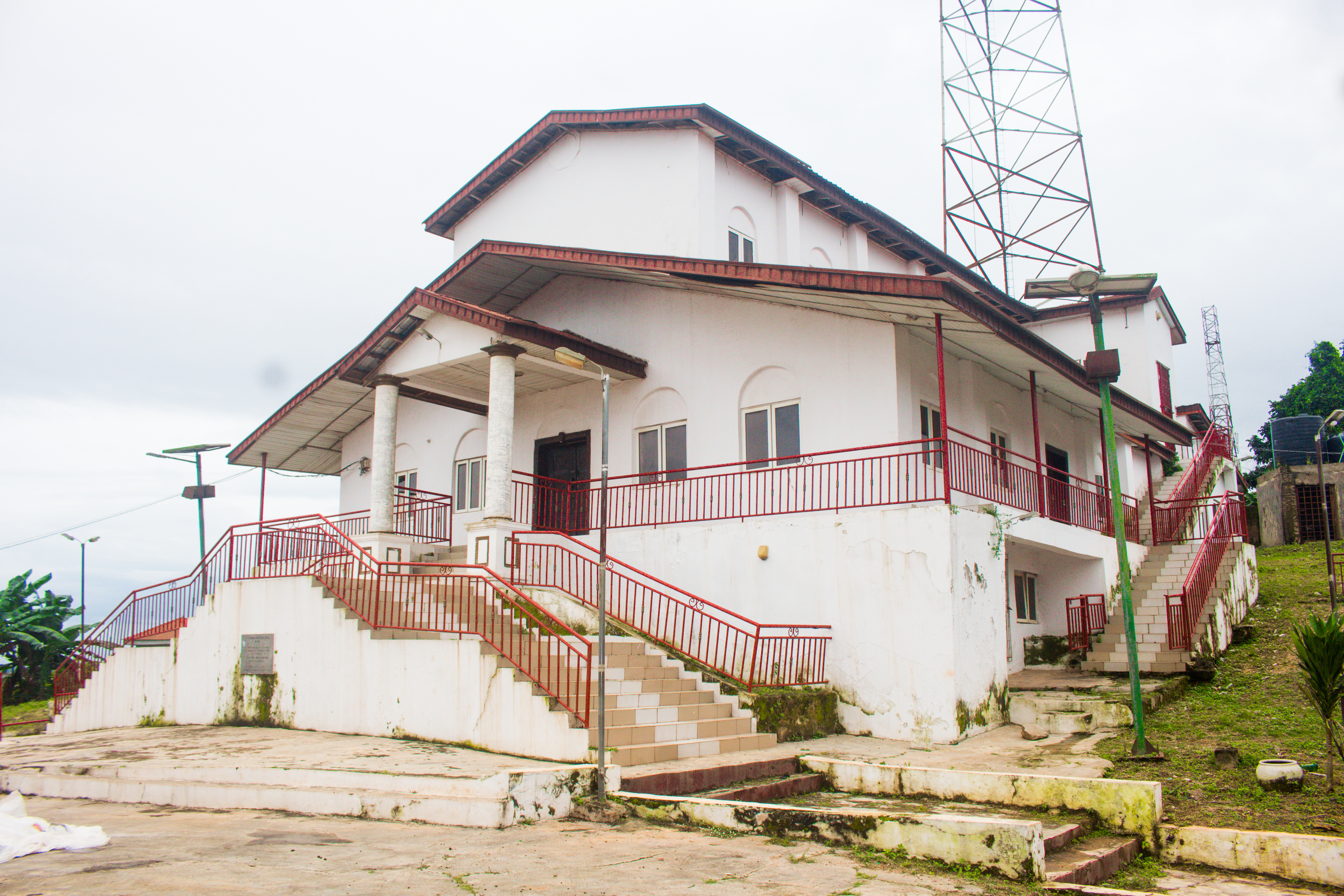
The World Ifa Temple, Oke 'Tase, Ile-Ife, Nigeria. The building was first constructed in 1932 and was refurbished in 2014

Awo (babalawos and iyalawos) in every tradition study the 256 Odu; each Odu is traditionally considered to include stories and prayers that have been passed down from the time that Orunmila walked the Earth as a prophet.

Some initiatory lineages have only male priests of Orunmila, while other lineages include female priestesses. The term "Awo", meaning "secret" is a gender-neutral title for an initiated priest of Orunmila. The debate surrounding gender is a result of diversity in the history of Ifá in various locations. In Latin America and some areas of West Africa, only men may become full priests of Orunmila, while in other regions of West Africa the priesthood is open to women. Ifá practitioners believe in duality in life: males exist because of the female essence and females exist because of the male essence, so every major rite or ceremony includes both genders.

Every Ifá stanza has one portion dedicated to the issue of teaching the Iwa that Ifá supports. This Iwa, which Ifá teaches transcends religious doctrine, is central to every human being, and imparts communal, social and civic responsibility that Olodumare supports. Of great importance to this is the theme of righteousness and practicing good moral behavior.

== See also ==
- Ifá
- Iroke Ifá
- Ọbatala
- Ọsanyin

== Resources ==
- Chief S. Solagbade Popoola & Fakunle Oyesanya, Ikunle Abiyamo: The ASE of Motherhood 2007. ISBN 978-0-9810013-0-2
- Chief S. Solagbade Popoola Library, INC Ifa Dida Volume One (EjiOgbe - Orangun Meji) ISBN 978-0-9810013-1-9
- Chief S. Solagbade Popoola Library, INC Ifa Dida Volume Two (OgbeYeku - OgbeFun) ISBN 978-1-926538-12-9
- Chief S. Solagbade Popoola Library, INC Ifa Dida Volume Three (OyekuOgbe - OyekuFun) ISBN 978-1-926538-24-2
- James J. Kulevich, "The Odu of Lucumi: Information on all 256 Odu Ifa"
- Ayele Fa'seguntunde' Kumari, Iyanifa:Women of Wisdom ISBN 978-1500492892
