= Opon Ifá =

Traditional African religious artefact

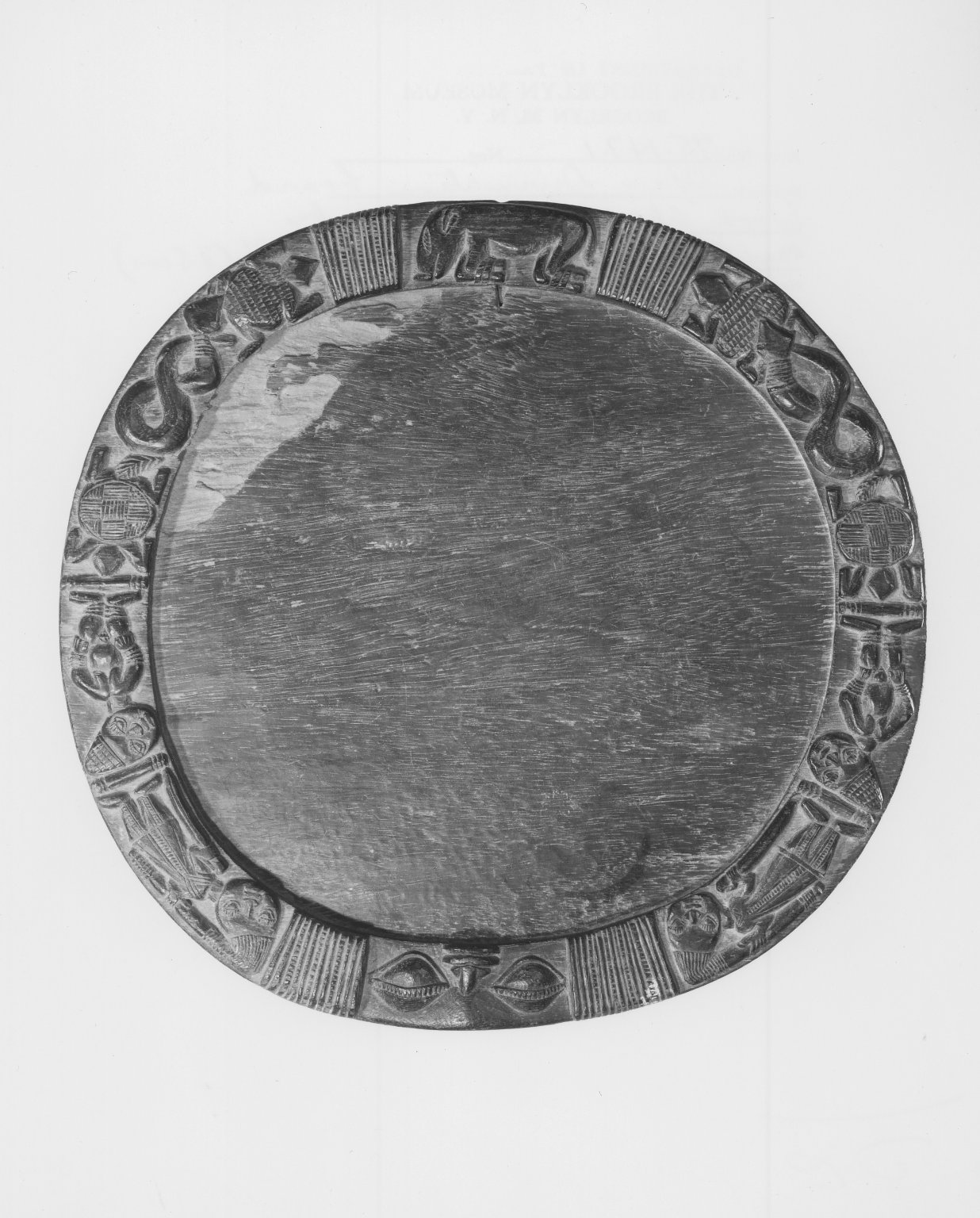
An early 20th century opon Ifá from the collection of the Brooklyn Museum

An Ọpọ́n Ifá or Àtẹ Ifá, is a divination tray used in traditional African and Afro-American religions, notably in the system known as Ifá and in Yoruba tradition more broadly. The etymology of ọpọn, literally meaning "to flatter", explains the artistic and embellished nature of the trays, as they are meant to praise and acknowledge the noble work of the babalawo (diviners). The etymology of the term Ifá, however, has been a subject of debate. Ifá may be considered an oriṣa, a Yoruba deity — specifically, the oriṣa of divination Ọrunmila. Conversely, some scholars have referred to Ifá merely as the "great consulting oracle" as opposed to a god or a deity, without any divine connotations.

Opon Ifá are typically made by wood carvers who specialize in the trays, and are made with designs per request of the patron babalawo or by the carver's own accord. The emphasis on the tray's design is not only due to their "flattering" nature, but also because of their functionality during consultation. Different carvers employ various aesthetic styles within West Africa and in the African diaspora, but most carvers are able to trace their influence back to Oyo, in present-day Nigeria.

During divination consultations, the opon Ifá is used by a babalawo to communicate with Ifá, who is able to identify the causes and solutions to personal and collective problems, and to restore harmony with the spirits. An intermediary orisha, Eṣu, serves as the messenger between the babalawo and Ifá, as the two spirits are close companions to each other. In conjunction with other divine instruments such as an iroke Ifá (diviner's tapper), ikin Ifá (sacred palm or kola nuts) or opele Ifá (divination chain), and iyẹrosun (divining powder), the opon Ifá is used to determine the Odu verses associated with a patron's particular predicament. Once an odu is revealed by Ifá, the babalawo then elucidates a solution that is embedded in the archetypal story described in the specific odu.

== Structure ==
Opon Ifá are wooden, generally between 15 and 46 centimeters (6 and 18 inches) in diameter, and are flat and usually circular; however, rectangular, semi-circular, and approximately square specimens have also been observed. The trays exhibit a raised outer perimeter – often embellished with carved figures, objects, and abstract geometric designs. The artistic intricacy of the peripheral carvings are a status marker among babalawos, and suggest their importance to clients. The top of the tray is called the "head" or the oju opon, and the bottom is conversely called the "feet" or the ese opon. Typically, the head is adorned with a carved depiction of Esu, the messenger of Ifá. Certain trays may have additional representations of Esu, and trays with two, four, eight, and even sixteen faces have been studied. In such cases, the "head" of the tray may be designated by cowries. The cowries are also used to spread the sacred divining powder, iyerosun.

The peripheral markings of the opon Ifá are functional as well as ornamental. They serve to divide the perimeter into nine different sections that contribute symbolic significance during consultations. Each section is named after one of nine ancient and influential diviners. In a divination reading, the babalawo sits facing east with the opon Ifá in front of them, such that the "feet" of the tray is closest to them. In this orientation, the oju opon ("face of the tray"), ese opon ("feet of the tray"), ona kanran ("straight path"), and the ona murun ("direct path") are respectively situated on the east, west, south and north sides of the tray's perimeter. On the diagonals from these cardinal directions are four additional sections or diviners: alaselosi ("the one who implements with the left") to the northeast, alabolotun ("the one who proposes with the right") to the southeast, afurukeresayo ("the one who has a diviner's fly-whisk and is happy") to the northwest, and ajiletepowo ("an early riser who sits down and prospers") to the southwest. The final section is the space in the center of the tray, the erilade opon ("the meeting place that crowns all"), for a total of nine sections. These sections come into play during consultations when the babalawo individually evokes the presence of Ifá and the nine ancient diviners before beginning the reading of the tray.

The circumference of opon Ifá may also be carved with animals that are significant in Yoruba mythology. Such markings are believed by practitioners to allow the babalawo to harness the powers of the depicted animal, enhancing the general efficacy of the tray, or heightening the effectiveness of certain odu. The abilities of the animals can sometimes be inferred by examining their roles in any of the 256 archetypal stories associated with the odu. For instance, opon Ifá may display carvings of bush rats, or okete, which in Yoruba mythology can take on human form to conduct nighttime mischief. Birds are also depicted, which symbolize witchcraft. Finally, according to diviners from Oyo, Nigeria, snakes may symbolize the efficacy of Ifá divination as a whole, as it is believed that snakes obtained their venomous capacity from Ifá – as outlined in the odu okaran asa. Furthermore, snakes may symbolize Ifá himself, perhaps responsible for their prevalence in opon Ifá and in other Yoruba art. When abstract or crisscross markings are incorporated with zoomorphic imagery, they may offer a kinetic and sentient quality to the depicted animals, further enhancing the tray's divine potency.

=== Yoruba carvers ===
Historically, Yoruba carvers played an important role in their communities – many were specialists, creating an array of objects from the banal (e.g. stools, walking sticks, etc.) to the divine (e.g. shrine sculptures, headdresses, etc.). Most of the carvers specialized in opon Ifá traced their roots to Are Lagbayi, a master palace wood carver of old Oyo, in present-day Nigeria. His legacy is continued by the opon Ifá carvers who are frequented by babalawo, and create trays with designs of their own discretion or by request of their patron diviners. Some sources of aesthetic inspiration are the fables of storied diviners, the spirits and archetypal everyday experiences described by the odu, and instruments used during Ifá consultations – such as the iroke Ifá.

=== Variations ===
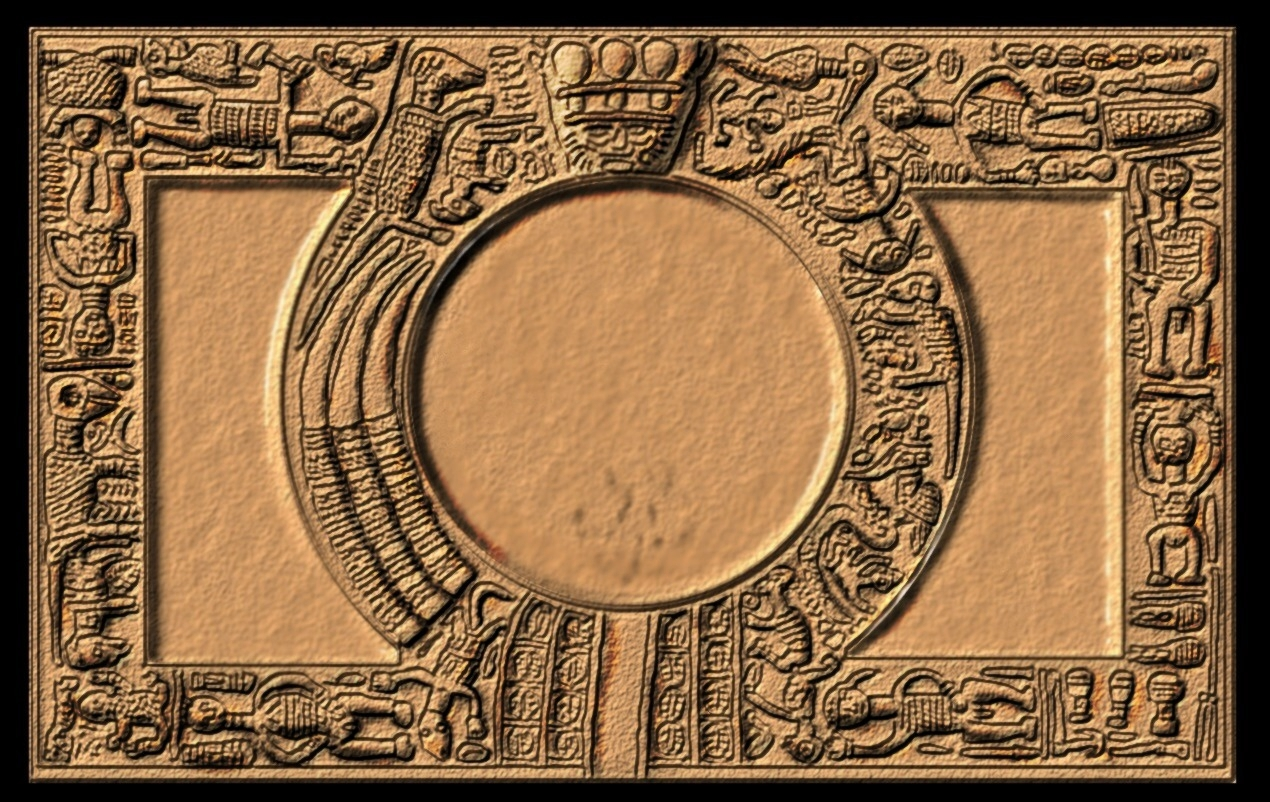
A 17th century Dahomeyan opon Ifá with a circular erilade opon circumscribed within a rectangular frame.

There are variations in the structure of opon Ifá, particularly in regard to the number and location of depicted Esu faces and the geometric shape of the board. Even within a town there will be different forms of the tray. For example, one tray may depict Esu with his chin protruding into the center of the tray (the erilade opon), while another depicts two Esu faces on opposite sides of the tray. Although the Ifá system of divination finds its roots among the Yoruba, its practise has spread amongst the African diaspora and is known by different names, with subtle to profound alterations.

Beyond the foundational features of the opon Ifá outlined above, the functional nature of the structural enhancements cannot be generalized and are typically left to the artist's discretion. A particularly notable specimen is one from the 17th century Kingdom of Dahomey, in present-day Benin, which was used for Fá divination. This board displays a standard circular opon Ifá in the center of the tray, but is encompassed by a larger, rectangular tray. In Cuban Santería, heavily influenced by Ifá, opon Ifá may also be employed; this will often display a broad color gamut, and may lack a depiction of Esu.

== Yoruba beliefs ==
The face of Esu, the intermediary orisha between Ifá and the babalawo, is generally carved into the opon Ifá's perimeter to acknowledge his critical role during divine consultations and to allow the babalawo to directly confront him. The relationship between the two deities is outlined in the Yoruba canon – specifically from among the 256 odu, or verses, that the babalawo interprets from the opon Ifá – and provides an account for how Esu came to occupy his role. The following is an account of the myth by an Ifá chief from Oyo, Nigeria:

Ifá and Esu are two of the four-hundred orisha sent to Earth by Olodumare, the supreme being in Yoruba religion. Each of the four-hundred divinities has unique supernatural abilities; Ifá knows the predestined fate of all human beings, and Esu is the keeper of the ase (divine power or authority). Esu, confident in his status as the wisest among all of Olodumare's spirits, administered a test to 398 of the other deities, all of whom failed. Only then did Esu test Ifá.

Esu requested that Ifá supervise his monkey for one week while he undertook a journey. Ifá agreed, but first he asked Esu to tie the monkey to the tree in front of his house. After Esu had embarked on his journey, Ifá consulted an oracle to see what Esu's intentions were for his journey. The oracle prescribed to Ifá a sacrificial offering of bananas that must be performed deep in a thick forest. Ifá obliged and performed the sacrifice, only to find Esu's monkey missing once he returned to the tree in front of his home. Esu, having suddenly decided to not pursue his trip, returned to Ifá's home to see that Ifá had broken his commitment. Grief-stricken, Esu began to weep. He informed Ifá that if he did not find the monkey within the seven days that it takes for his tears to fall to the ground, Ifá would be cursed without peace for the rest of his life. Seeking a solution, Ifá once again consulted the oracle, who told him to return to the exact spot in the forest where the sacrifice of bananas had been performed. There, he would find the monkey. Ifá accepted the oracle's guidance and found Esu's monkey in the forest. Having returned the monkey to Esu before his tears hit the earth, Ifá completed the test and sealed his partnership with Esu. To express his gratitude, Esu swore to be a companion and accomplice to Ifá in all his endeavors. Thus, Esu acts as the mouthpiece through which Ifá imparts his clairvoyant knowledge.

== In divination consultations ==
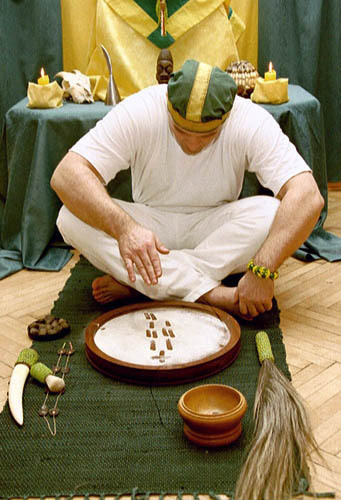
A babalawo writing odu in iyerosun. An opele and iroke Ifá are present on his right.

During a divination session, the babalawo first properly orients the tray with the "feet" of the opon Ifá facing towards him. He sits facing east, the direction from which Ifá is thought to have come from the spiritual plane, and allows light to illuminate the tray, being careful to prevent shadows from landing on the wood. Once properly oriented, an iroke Ifá, or a diviner's tapper, is used by the babalawo to evoke the presence of Ifá via the rhythmic drumming of the tapper on the surface of the opon Ifá. The nine diviners symbolically depicted in the tray's perimeter are also summoned. Then, sixteen palm or kola nuts, the ikin Ifá, are thrown onto the opon Ifá's wooden surface and the babalawo proceeds to interpret which of the 256 possible sets of odu (verses) are displayed by the nuts. An odu is essentially a word or sign of eight marks that is drawn in the iyerosun powder scattered over the tray. Each of the signs have corresponding verses which must be chanted and chosen according to the client's particular situation.

Each of the odu is constructed by individually determining each "letter" of the odu in a step-wise manner, starting from the bottom-right division of the border, then the bottom-left. Working up from bottom to top, this process is repeated six more times until the complete odu is constructed and written on the board. If sacred palm nuts are used, sixteen nuts are held in one hand by the babalawo. With the other hand, he snatches as many as he can out of his palm. If there is one remaining, he draws two vertical lines into the iyerosun powder on the board. If there are two nuts remaining, he draws only one line. The process continues until two figures of four segments each are formed.

Another way to use the opon Ifá incorporates a divination chain known as opele Ifá, reserving the palm or kola nuts for more serious questions. The opele consists of a chain of eight half-kola nuts strung together, each associated with one of the eight letters of an odu and a site along the tray's border. After evoking the spirits with the iroke Ifá, the babalawo then throws the opele; each of the eight half-nuts will land concave up or concave down, heads or tails. A single line represents "heads" while two vertical lines symbolize "tails" – this process is recorded in the iyerosun powder, as it is done with the palm nuts. Thus, this binary system of one and two vertical lines gives rise to 256 different odu, each associated with a spirit and certain archetypal situation. Some odu are affirmative, and others are negative. Furthermore, the odu determines what offerings the babalawo prescribes to the client in order for them to achieve their desired ends.

== See also ==
- Iroke Ifá
- Odu Ifa
- Yoruba religion
- Divination
