= Iyalawo =

Traditional Yoruba priestess

Iyalawo is a term in the Yoruba religion and other derived religions (especially Lucumi) that literally means "mother of mysteries" or "mother of wisdom" (iyá: “mother”; awó “mysteries"). Some adherents use the term "mamalawo," which is a partially African diasporic version of the term, iyaláwo and yeyelawo are two more versions of mother of mysteries. Ìyánífá is a Yoruba word that can be translated as "mother (ìyá) has or of (ní) Ifá" or "mother in Ifá" and is the Yoruba title for mother of mysteries and the female equivalent of a babalawo.

== Differences between terms ==
While iyaláwo and ìyánífá are often used interchangeably, the terms have different denotations and connotations. The term ìyánífá specifically relates to Ifá and could indicate that a female undertakes Ifá divination or is a custodian of Ifá in a personal or professional capacity; the term may also indicate that a woman has had Itefa or itelodu initiation. The term iyaláwo indicates a woman who has knowledge of sacred wisdom that may include Ifa but goes beyond Ifá. The significance of the iyaláwo in Yoruba cosmology is said to extend to its creator, Odù. In The Architects of Existence: Àjẹ́ in Yoruba Cosmology, Ontology, and Orature, Teresa N. Washington says of Odù: “Odù, as the Àjẹ́, is the consummate Iyaláwo: The mysteries of the Cosmos swirl in the core of her being.”

Ifá is a divination system that represents the oracular utterance of Odù, who is also known as Odùduwà. Linguist and cultural historian Modupe Oduyoye said that the meaning of Odùduwà is Odù-ó dá ìwà "oracular utterance created existence."

== Historical accounts of iyalawo and iyanifa ==
According to Babalawo K. Ositola from Ijebu, Nigeria, it was a woman, Odu, who taught her husband Orunmila how to divine so that he could communicate with the spiritual world. The history of women casting Ifa is well-documented in the ese Ifa. Oyeronke Olajubu's Women in the Yoruba Religious Sphere analyzes an ese Ifa of Eji Ogbe in which Orunmila is asked why his daughter is not practicing Ifa. When he replies that she is female, he is informed that that is no taboo. Following this, Orunmila's daughter studied Ifa and "From then on women have studied Ifa / They prescribe sacrifice / They are initiated into the Ifa corpus." A verse in Iwori Meji mentions that Orunmila's daughter is named Alara and that she underwent an apprenticeship from Orunmila. When he had a son, she was responsible for a large part of her younger brother's training. The Arugba Ifa, mother of Onibogi, the 8th Alaafin of Oyo, is documented as introducing Ifa to Oyo.

The Ifa Odu Odi Ogbe speaks of a woman divining and performing ritual sacrifice for Orunmila by the name Eruko-ya-l'egan o d'Oosa also known as Orisa Oke. The Odù Ifá describes how an ìyánífá called Ugbin Ejo divines for Òfún Méji and also eventually becomes the mother of Ògbóni.

Royal mothers of Yoruba rulers were also necessarily iyaláwo and ìyánífá. For example, Biodun Adediran in "Women, Rituals, and Politics in Pre-Colonial Yorubaland" reveals that the Ìyá Mọlẹ̀ serves as the Yoruba rulers' “personal Ifa priestess and head of all Ifa priests.”

Another documented African iyalawo was Agbaye Arabinrin Oluwa, who lived c. 200 AD in Nigeria. Chief Fama Aina Adewale Somadhi, a contemporary and prominent Yoruba born iyalawo, was initiated in 1988 by Chief ‘Fagbemi Ojo Alabi, the late Araba of Ayetoro town, Egbado, and the Oluwo (or High Priest) of Ogun State, Nigeria. The first documented American Iyalawo was Dr. D'Haifa Odufora Ifatogun, who was initiated in 1985.

Mattie Curtis-Iyanifa Ifakemi Oyesanya, initiated in the Oyesanya Compound by Araba Oyesanya and Ayoka Oyesanya, baptized into Yoruba religion by pioneering Babalawo and Babalorisha Dr. Cliff Stewart (Oba Dekun) was the first African American women initiated into Ifa in 1993. The first Lucumi iyaonifas initiated were María Cuesta Conde and Nidia Aguila de León in 2000.

== Lineage variations of iyanifa ==
The position of iyalawo is found in both West Africa and in the Americas. Every town, country and lineage has different customs, although most towns in Yorubaland initiate women at present. The priesthood of women is denied by many in the Lucumí tradition in Cuba. As with the various lineages throughout the Caribbean and the Americas, the Lucumí lineage is distinct from African lineages, as can be seen in an accord reached by a group of Lucumí Oba Oriatés, babalaos, and olorichás on June 2, 2010.

Initially, the Cuban lineage dominated the United States due to the large influx of Cuban immigrants settling in its large cities. As a result, the position of iyanifa did not become well known in the States until the 1990s, when African American women began to go to Africa for their initiations. In the book Orisa Devotion as World Religion, Dr. Eason recounts how in 1992, the King of Oyotunji, Adefunmi, under pressure from women at Oyotunji to allow them to be initiated as Ifá priests, went to Benin, having assumed that Ile Ife did not initiate women at the time.

It is noted that women have always received Ifa initiations in West Africa through Ifa, Afa, or Fa, as it is known in various lineages.

The pressure began in Oyotunji after Iyanifa Ifafunmike Osunbunmi was initiated in Osogbo, Nigeria, in 1995 by the Babalawo Ifayemi Elebuibon, the Araba of Osogbo. In the book Iyanifa: Women of Wisdom, she recounts the initial resistance of Oyotunji village because its people did not know women could be initiated up to that point.

Ode Remo is an example of a Yoruba kingdom that does not currently offer Itefa to women. Ode Remo demonstrates a history of once having done so, as noted in the book Women in the Yoruba Religion by Ode Remo author Oluwo Olotunji Somorin. This claim is further substantiated by other sources.

There are hundreds of women initiated as iyalawos or iyanifas in West Africa and the diaspora, according to the Ifa Women's Association. American women are the fastest growing group of priests in the tradition. This is due to American women having advanced degrees and the financial resources to support themselves and finance trips to Africa. They are still challenged by some houses in the Cuban Lukumi community, houses generally headed by males, which actively oppose their ministries.

There is a small community of iyaonifas in the Cuban Lukumi community, however. María Cuesta Conde and Nidia Aguila de León were the first Iyanifas initiated in Cuba by Victor Betancourt Estrada in March, 2000. Matanzas Babalawo Ernesto Acosta Cediez went on to initiate the Venezuelan lawyer, Alba Marina Portales, as an iyanifa in 2002 with the help of Estrada. The following quote from Estrada explains his decision: "In the Ifá room, initiation to the feminine orisha Odú, the mother of all living beings and the first woman diviner (she who married Orúnmila and had sixteen children who were converted into the sixteen Olodú or major signs of Ifá), is represented." This demonstrates that to consecrate any diviner, masculine and feminine participation is required. The Ifá verse Oshe Tura requires that women and their power be recognized and specifically that it is forbidden to leave women out of religious activities. Oshun, a female orisha who is featured in Oshe Tura, "encountered men who would not recognize her, so she established a sect of women called Iyami Aje to counterbalance the injustice. The male orishas were rendered powerless, and were not effective until Oshun was included amongst their number."

== See also ==
- Babalawo
- Iyami Aje
- Mãe-de-santo
