= Ajere Ifa =

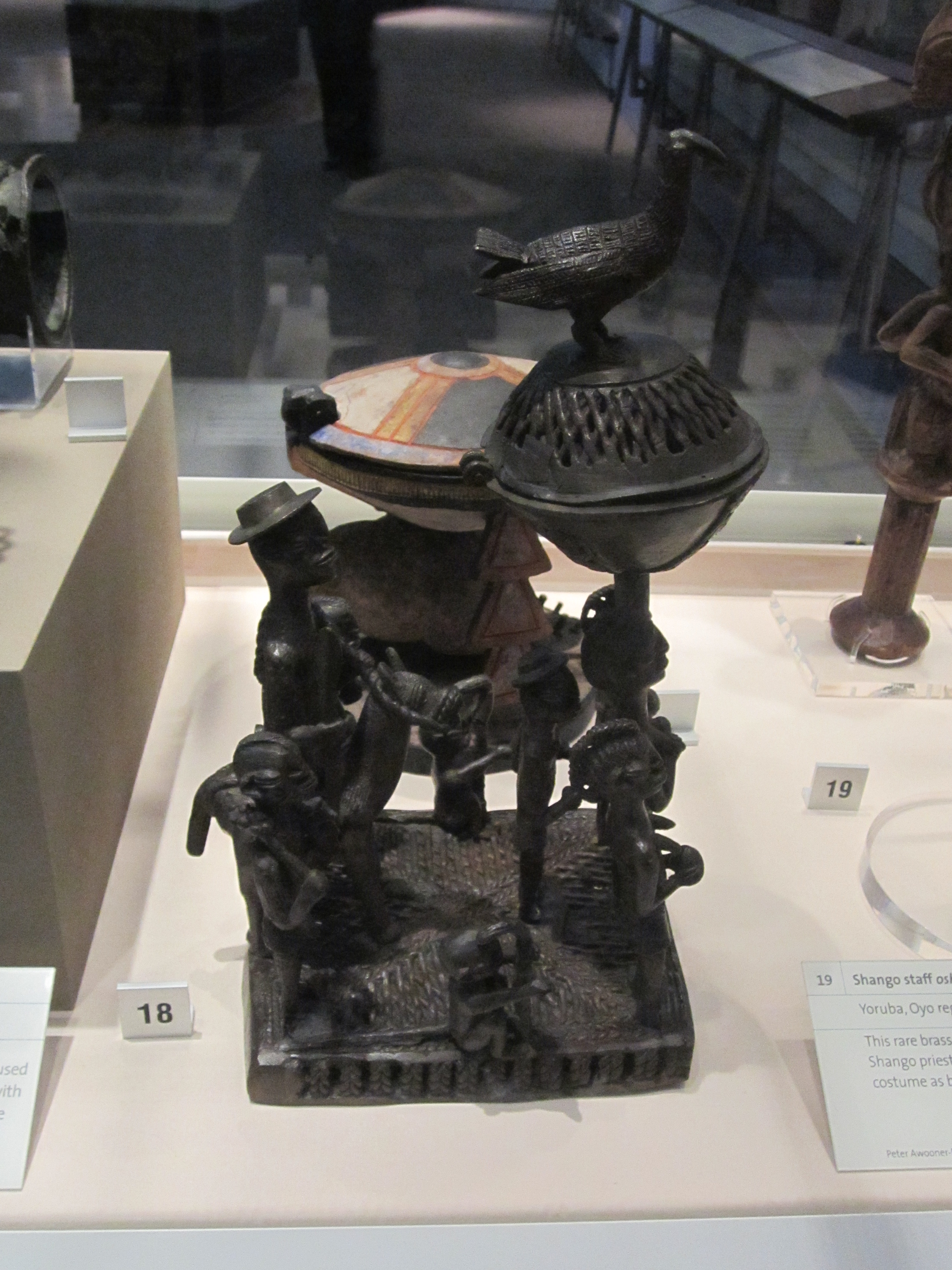
Ifa divination bowl, agere Ifa (Yoruba, Nigeria), World Museum Liverpool

Agere Ifá (Yorùbá: àgéré Ifá) is a holding receptacle, vessel or container for keeping and raising the sacred palm nuts or ikin used in Ifá divination. Most Agere are made from a medium of wood, but also ivory and coconut shells. Given its ritual and aesthetic functions, making the àgéré Ifá provides the Yoruba carver with a unique opportunity to display his artistic talents.

Usually carved from wood and measuring between five and sixteen inches in height, a typical container is in the form of an animal or human figure bearing a small bowl. In some cases, the metaphysical attribute of a given animal motif (such as a snake or mudfish) may be used to further empower the sacred palm nuts inside the bowl. But when the motif assumes a human form, it frequently has a votive significance, especially since some àgéré Ifá are given by clients to a diviner to thank Òrúnmìlà for a blessing or to implore the deity to bestow more favors on the donor.
