= Teresa N. Washington =

African American academic, author, activist, and public speaker

Teresa N. Washington is an African American academic, author, activist, and public speaker. She is known for her research on Àjẹ́, a Yorùbá term that defines both a spiritual power inherent in Africana women and the persons who have that power. Washington's book Our Mothers, Our Powers, Our Texts: Manifestations of Àjẹ́ in Africana Literature is the first comprehensive book-length study of Àjẹ́. Her book The Architects of Existence: Àjẹ́ in Yoruba Cosmology, Ontology, and Orature gives an in-depth analysis of the power of Àjẹ́ in the Yorùbá ethos and worldview.

== Education and career ==
Washington earned her bachelor's degree in English (graduating magna cum laude) from Fisk University where she was inducted into the Phi Beta Kappa honor society in 1993. She earned her master's degree from the University of Mississippi in 1996, during which time she undertook study at the University of Ghana-Legon. Washington earned her PhD in Literature-in-English from Obafemi Awolowo University, Ile-Ife, Nigeria in 2000.

Dr. Washington has taught at Obafemi Awolowo University; Fisk University; California State University, Stanislaus; Kent State University, and Grambling State University, where she was named the Ann Petry Endowed Professor in English in 2008.

== Literary works ==
=== Books ===
Washington's first book Our Mothers, Our Powers, Our Texts: Manifestations of Àjẹ́ in Africana Literature was published in 2005. This book analyzes the power of Àjẹ́ and the Òrìṣà and historical figures who have and wield the power. The book also examines Àjẹ́'s global dispersal, through Africans who travelled throughout the world of their own volition and those who were exiled from Africa by force and enslaved, and Àjẹ́'s impact in ancient oral literature and contemporary African and African American literature. Washington's book includes the Ìtàn-Oríkì Ìyàmi Òṣòròngà which is a praise song and historical delineation of Àjẹ́ in Yorùbá language. Washington published a revised expanded edition of Our Mothers, Our Powers, Our Texts in 2015, the book's 10-year anniversary.

In 2014, Dr. Washington published The Architects of Existence: Àjẹ́ in Yoruba Cosmology, Ontology, and Orature which focuses on Àjẹ́'s impact on and within the Yorùbá world. This book includes analyses of Àjẹ́'s roles in cosmic creation and in Yorùbá divination verses, known as ẹsẹ Ifá; elaborations on the role of Àjẹ́ in Yorùbá politics and political institutions, including Ògbóni Ìbílẹ̀; and exploration of the impact of Àjẹ́ in the lives and art of notable Yorùbá men including Wole Soyinka, Toyin Falola, Fela Anikulapo Kuti, and Olatubosun Oladapo. The Architects of Existence was included in California Institute of Integral Studies list of "100 of the Best New Women's Spirituality Books."

Washington is the author of Manifestations of Masculine Magnificence: Divinity in Africana Life, Lyrics, and Literature in 2014. This book traces the divinity of Africana men (and women) in various sources, including biblical scripture, Qur'anic surah and hadith, and the philosophies of Father Divine, Sun Ra, Mutabaruka, the Nation of Islam, and the Five Percent Nation. In addition to analyzing lyrics of Bob Marley and Peter Tosh, Killarmy, Sunz of Man, Lord Jamar, Gravediggaz, and Fela Anikulapo Kuti, Washington also explores African male divinity in Toni Morrison's Song of Solomon, August Wilson's Joe Turner's Come and Gone, Ngugi wa Thiongo's Wizard of the Crow, and Ishmael Reed's Mumbo Jumbo.

Dr. Washington is the editor of The African World in Dialogue: An Appeal to Action! The book includes the "Citizens' Defense Proposal" that Washington wrote with attorney Muhammad Ibn Bashir. The proposal describes "extrajudicial killings" by police officers of citizens as "a violation of the public trust and a violation of citizens' fundamental human rights." The proposal states that, given their responsibilities, officers of the law should be held to the highest standards and be subjected to the same, if not stricter, penalties as laypersons who kill unarmed citizens.

== Other activities ==
While earning her master's degree at the University of Mississippi, Washington researched the life of Caroline Barr, the African American woman who worked for William Faulkner and is called "Mammy Callie." Washington published her research on Barr in the article "Caroline Barr: Laughing Behind the Myth of Mammy." Ann Fisher-Wirth's poem "Where, beneath the Magnolia" is dedicated to Washington, and it documents Washington's research on and spiritual relationship with Caroline Barr.

In 2019 Washington published "A Day for the Owner," an exposé that documents Washington's battles against plagiarists of her books.

In the fall of 2016 Washington and her daughter Oduduwa co-hosted a segment called "Nation Time!" on WRFG's "'What Good is a Song?' The Friday Night Drum" radio program in Atlanta, GA. Washington and Oduduwa analyzed such issues as extrajudicial killings by police officers, self-hatred in the Africana community, and the relationship between hip hop and hypersexuality.

=== Other publications ===
Washington's works are published in the following anthologies: Harold Bloom's Modern Critical Interpretations: Toni Morrison's Beloved: New Edition; Yemoja: Gender, Sexuality, and Creativity in the Latina/o and Afro-Atlantic Diasporas; and ÈṢÙ: God, Power, and the Imaginative Frontiers. Washington's analyses are published in various literary magazines, including the Journal of American Folklore, African American Review, FEMSPEC, and the Journal of African Studies (now known as Africology).

== Selected publications ==
=== Books ===
- The African World in Dialogue: An Appeal to Action! Editor. Ọya's Tornado, 2016. ISBN 0991073088
- Our Mothers, Our Powers, Our Texts: Manifestations of Àjẹ́ Africana Literature. Revised and Expanded Edition. Ọya's Tornado, 2015. ISBN 0991073053
- The Architects of Existence: Àjẹ́ in Yoruba Cosmology, Ontology, and Orature. Ọya's Tornado, 2014. ISBN 0991073010
- Manifestations of Masculine Magnificence: Divinity in Africana Life, Lyrics, and Literature. Ọya's Tornado, 2014. ISBN 0991073002
- Our Mothers, Our Powers, Our Texts: Manifestations of Àjẹ́ Africana Literature. Bloomington: Indiana University Press, 2005. ISBN 0253345456

=== Book chapters ===
- "'The Sea Never Dies': Yemọja: The Curvilinear Force of Artistic, Spiritual and Biological Creativity in the African Continuum." In Yemoja: Gender, Sexuality, and Creativity in the Latina/o and Afro-Atlantic Diasporas. Eds. Solimar Otero and Toyin Falola. New York: SUNY Press, 2013. 215–266. ISBN 1438448007
- "The Penis, The Pen, and The Praise: Èṣù: The Seminal Force of African American Life, Literature, and Lyrics." In ÈṢÙ: God, Power, and the Imaginative Frontiers. Ed. Toyin Falola. Durham: Carolina Academic Press, 2013. 315–345. ISBN 1611632226
- "The Mother-Daughter Àjẹ́ Relationship in Toni Morrison's Beloved." Reprinted in Harold Bloom's Modern Critical Interpretations: Toni Morrison's Beloved: New Edition. Ed. Harold Bloom. New York: Chelsea House, 2009. 49–72. ISBN 1604131845
- "An Atlantic Away: A Letter from Africa." In Step into a World: An Anthology of Young African-American Writers. Ed. Kevin Powell. New York: John Wiley and Sons, 2000. 404–417. ISBN 0471380601

=== Selected articles ===
- "Rapping with the Gods: Hip Hop as a Force of Divinity and Continuity from the Continent to the Cosmos." Journal of Pan African Studies 6:9 (2014): 72–100.
- "Mules and Men and Messiahs: Continuity in Yoruba Divination Verses and African American Orature." Journal of American Folklore 125:497 (2012): 263–285.
- "Nickels in the Nation Sack: Continuity in Africana Spiritual Technologies." Journal of Pan-African Studies. Featured article. Special Edition: Black Spirituality. 3:5 (March 2010): 5–28.
- "The Mother-Daughter Àjẹ́ Relationship in Toni Morrison's Beloved." African American Review 39:1&2 (Spring/Summer 2005): 171–188.
- "Power of the Word/Power of the Works: The African Spiritual Impetus in African American Women's Literature." FEMSPEC 6:1 (2005): 58–70.
- "Re-embodiment of Mother Daughter Àjẹ́ Relationship in Toni Morrison's Beloved." The Literary Griot 13:1&2 (Spring/Fall 2001): 100–119.
- "Re-Membering the Prophet: Spiritual Transcendence in Lumumba, la mort du prophete and Season in the Congo." The Literary Griot 9:1&2 (Spring/Fall 1997): 92–111.
- "Caroline Barr: Laughing Behind the Myth of Mammy." Southern Exposure XXV: 1&2 (Spring/Summer 1997): 51–54.
