= Opele =

Divination chain used in traditional African and Afro-American religions

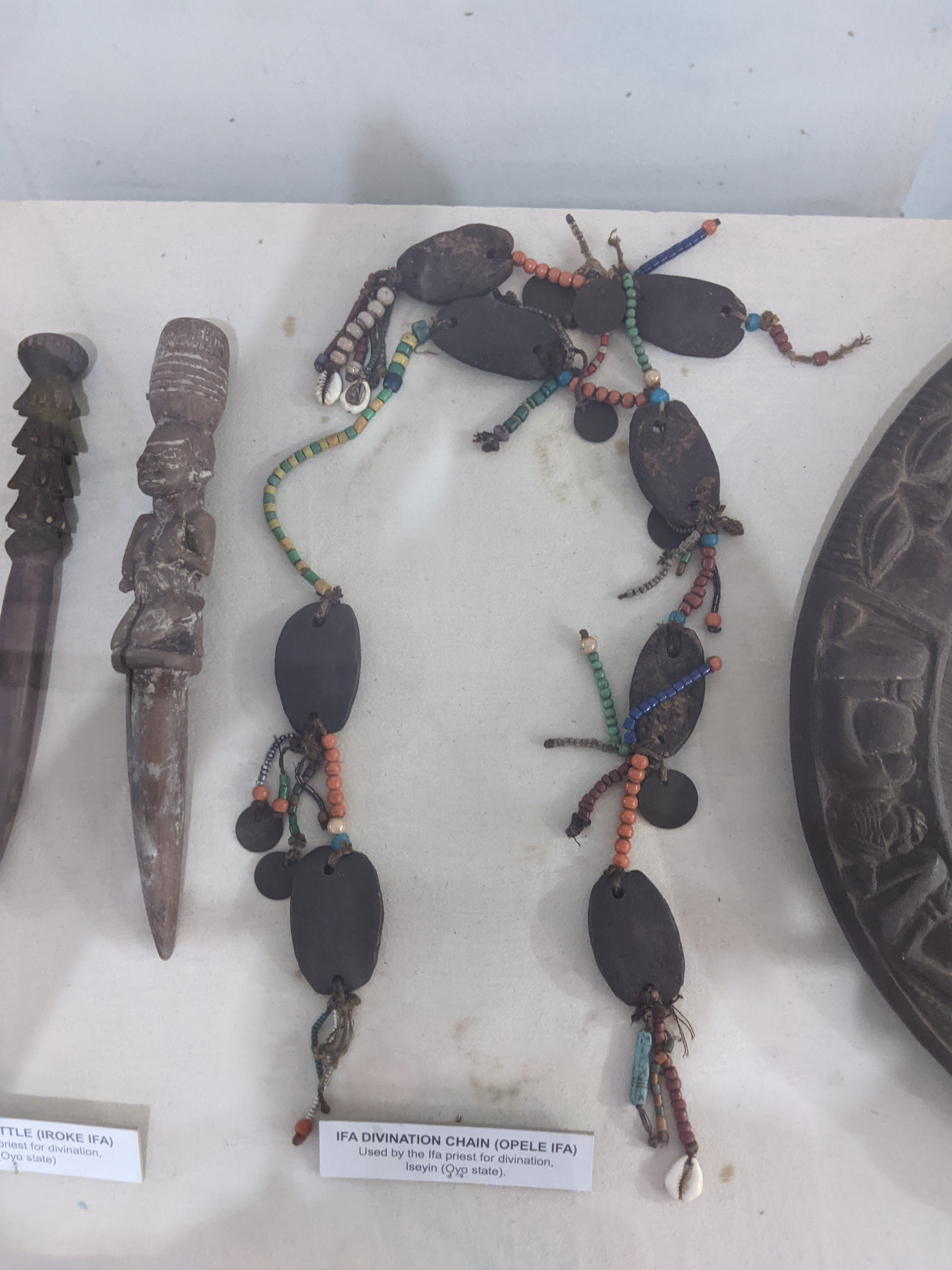
Ifa divination chain (Opele Ifa) procured from Iseyin

An opele (spelled opuele or ocuele in Latin America) is a divination chain used in traditional African and Afro-American religions, notably in Ifá and Yoruba tradition.

A babalawo (diviner) uses the opele in order to communicate with the deity of wisdom/knowledge in the Yoruba tradition (Ọrunmila), who is able to identify the causes and solutions to personal and collective problems and restore harmony in the person's life through re-balancing of the person's destiny and/or ori (personal deity). The opele is the minor divination tool used by babalawos for Ifá divination; it is believed to be an "assistant" or "slave" of Ọrunmila, who communicates Ọrunmila's desires to the babalawo and from the babalawo back to Ọrunmila. It is used for the majority of daily divination work. For divination regarding important ceremonial revelations or life-long information about a client or for very important decisions, babalawos elect to use their ikin seeds, which they consider to be the physical representation of Ọrunmila himself.
