= Babalawo =

Traditional Yoruba priest

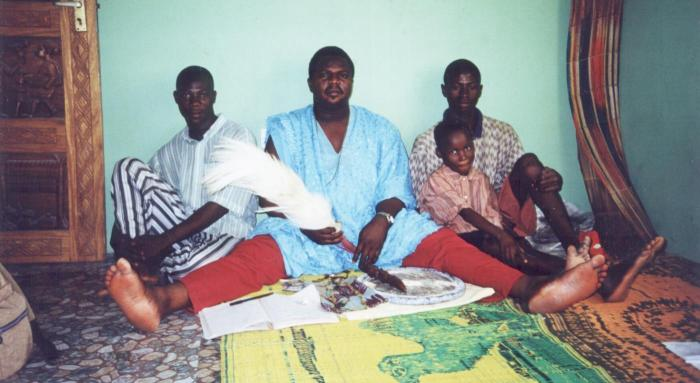
African babalawo

Babalawo or babaláwo in West Africa (babalao in Caribbean and South American Spanish and babalaô in Brazilian Portuguese), literally means "father of secrets" (or “father of mysteries”) in the Yoruba language. It is a spiritual title that denotes a high priest of the Ifá oracle. Ifá is a divination system that represents the teachings of the òrìṣà Ọrunmila, the òrìṣà of wisdom, who in turn serves as the oracular representative of Olodumare. The babalawo serves as a religious figure as well as a cultural bridge, helping to preserve language, proverbs, and ritual customs that are foundational to Yoruba identity.

== History of babalawo ==
The term "babalawo" typically refers to a Yoruba religious figure, often considered a priest or diviner, within the Ifá system of the Yoruba people in West Africa. The Ifá system is a complex and ancient divination and religious practice that is deeply rooted in Yoruba history and mythology, making it challenging to pinpoint a specific beginning. However, it is generally believed that the Ifá system has ancient origins, dating back centuries within the Yoruba civilization.

The Ifá system revolves around the worship of Ọrunmila, who is considered the orisha (deity) of wisdom and divination. Ọrunmila is believed to have received the knowledge of Ifá from Olodumare, the supreme deity in the Yoruba pantheon. According to Yoruba mythology, Ọrunmila then shared this knowledge with human beings, and the practice of Ifá divination was established to guide individuals in making decisions, understanding their destiny, and seeking spiritual guidance.

Babalawos are the custodians of the Ifá knowledge and play a crucial role in performing Ifá divination ceremonies, interpreting the messages of Ọrunmila, and providing guidance to individuals and communities. They undergo extensive training and are initiated into the priesthood, often passing down their knowledge through apprenticeship and oral tradition. In some cases, their training includes mastery of hundreds of odu Ifá verses, herbal medicine, ritual performance, and the spiritual philosophy of Yoruba cosmology.

While the specific historical details may be challenging to ascertain due to the ancient nature of the Ifá system, it is clear that the babalawo and Ifá practice have deep cultural and religious significance within the Yoruba community. Today, Ifá continues to be practiced not only in Nigeria, where the Yoruba people are predominant but also among Yoruba diaspora communities around the world. Countries like Cuba, Brazil, Trinidad, and the United States have become vibrant centers of Ifá and Orisha worship, with babalawos adapting their practice to new cultural environments while retaining the essence of the tradition.

== Functions in society ==
The babalawos are believed to ascertain the future of their clients through communication with Ifá. This is done through the interpretation of either the patterns of the divining chain known as opele, or the sacred palm nuts called ikin, on the traditionally wooden divination tray called opon Ifá.

In addition to this, some of them also perform divination services on behalf of the kings and paramount chiefs of the Yoruba people. These figures, holders of chieftaincy titles like Araba and Oluwo Ifa in their own right, are members of the recognised aristocracies of the various Yoruba traditional states. The Araba is often regarded as the highest-ranking babalawo in a town or region, serving as both a spiritual and community leader.

People can visit babalawos for spiritual consultations, which is known as Dafa. The religious system as a whole has been recognized by UNESCO as a “Masterpiece of the Oral and Intangible Heritage of Humanity." The practice of Divination can address a range of needs, from uncovering spiritual causes of illness to determining the appropriate sacrifices (ebo) needed to avert misfortune.

== Gender and the Priesthood ==
The role of women within the Ifá priesthood is a prominent topic of discussion and regional variation to this day. Although the title Babalawo literally translates to "father of secrets," women are indoctrinated into the tradition as well and hold the title Ìyánífá, or "mother of Ifá." While the priesthood is commonly considered a male-dominated space, research in West Africa and historical records reveal that women have served as Ifá diviners for many generations; their involvement is not merely a modern development.

In the present-day era, most of the debate regarding a woman's role revolves around specific ritual restrictions. The Orisha Odu is a major point of contention because of the title it holds as a powerful spiritual entity and ritual object. In many traditional circles, it was believed that women should be restricted from viewing and participating in ceremonies associated with Odu. However, these gendered taboos aren't universal and tend to vary by region and community. As the religion has spread across the globe—specifically in the United States—the number of female members has risen exponentially. This shift has led to a dynamic negotiation between historical Yoruba social structures and modern global values regarding gender equality, as the community determines how these ancient roles adapt to a developing world.

== Healing and Traditional Medicine ==
In Yoruba culture, there is often no real distinction between a physician’s medicine and a priest’s ritual. The term oogun directly reflects this and is broadly used to describe both pharmacological cures and spiritual charms. As a result, a Babalawo approaches healthcare through a holistic lens; rather than focusing primarily on the physical ailment, they address the patient’s mental and spiritual state as well.

The Babalawo utilizes the natural environment available to them as their "pharmacy," taking advantage of the vast array of plants, minerals, and animal products to treat everything from chronic diseases to psychiatric conditions. The healing process calls for a psychological component that is beyond the scope of just physical remedies. The use of incantations, as well as traditional narratives during treatment, has been compared by researchers to modern-day hypnosis, as these methods leverage the patient's imagination to facilitate recovery. This medicinal heritage remains a cornerstone of the Yoruba diaspora; for example, in Brazilian Candomblé, the ritualistic use of "sacred leaves" continues to be the primary method for maintaining community health.

== Impacts of babalawo ==
Babalawos are key custodians of the Ifá system, preserving and transmitting Yoruba cultural heritage through oral tradition, rituals, and ceremonies. This system provides a framework for understanding morality, human relationships, and the world at large. As spiritual leaders and diviners, babalawos offer guidance to individuals and communities by employing the Ifá divination process, addressing various aspects of life such as health, relationships, and career choices.

Furthermore, the Ifá system fosters community cohesion through participatory ceremonies, contributing to a shared cultural and religious framework. Some babalawos are also known for their knowledge of traditional healing practices, incorporating herbs, incantations, and spiritual interventions to address both physical and spiritual ailments within the community. Babalawos often play a role in conflict resolution within families or communities, drawing on the wisdom and ethical principles emphasized by the Ifá system. The impact extends to regions where the Yoruba diaspora has spread, resulting in cultural syncretism with other religious traditions, as seen in practices like Santería, Candomblé, and Vodou.

However, challenges and controversies exist. Critics may view certain practices as superstitious or express concerns about potential financial exploitation. Additionally, clashes may arise between traditional practices and modern views, particularly in societies undergoing rapid social changes.

Despite challenges, the Ifá system contributes significantly to the cultural identity of the Yoruba people, distinguishing them from other ethnic and religious groups and fostering pride in their cultural heritage. Moreover, global interest in the Ifa system from scholars, tourists, and spiritual seekers reflects its impact on a broader scale, with both positive appreciation for cultural richness and potential negative aspects related to commodification or misrepresentation of practices. The impacts of babalawo and the Ifá system are dynamic, evolving over time within the broader dynamics of cultural and religious practices in a changing world.

== In popular culture ==
- "Calle Luna, Calle Sol", a salsa song by Willie Colón and Héctor Lavoe about Crime in Puerto Rico, mentions babalawo saying "you may have a saint watching over you but you're not a babalawo" (Tu tienes un santo pero no eres babalao).
- In episode 3, season 1 of the American television series, It: Welcome to Derry based on the popular book by Stephen King, one of the protagonists, Rich, identifies his uncle as a babalawo, in an effort to understand the evil spirit haunting Derry.

== See also ==
- Babalú-Ayé
- Iyalawo
- Pai-de-santo
