= Ori (Yoruba) =

Metaphysical concept in the Yoruba religion

- Choices made in the Pre-life, Destiny, Personal Identity, Fate
- Member of Orisha
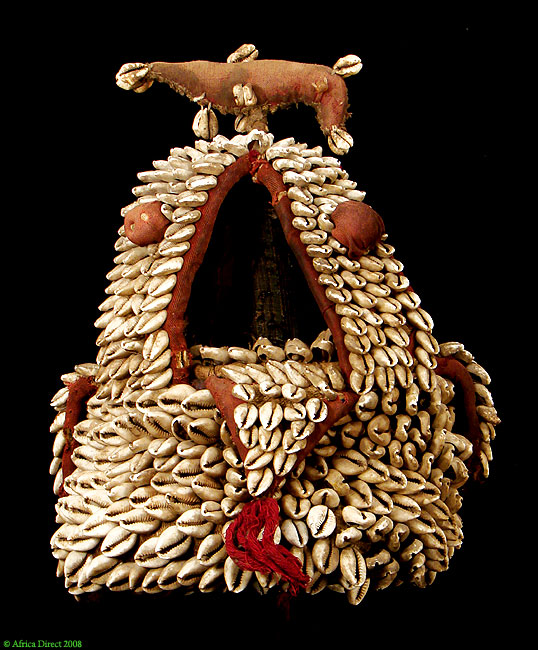
- Traditional Ile-Orí, one of many models
- Other names: Ori-inu
- Venerated in: Yoruba religion, Umbanda, Candomblé, Santería, Haitian Vodou, Folk Catholicism
- Region: Nigeria, Benin, Latin America, Togo,
- Ethnic group: Yoruba

Orí is a Yoruba metaphysical concept.

Orí, literally meaning "head," refers to one's spiritual intuition and destiny. It is the reflective spark of human consciousness embedded into the human essence, and therefore is often personified as an Orisha in its own right. It is believed by the Yoruba religion that human beings are able to heal themselves both spiritually and physically by working with the Orishas to achieve a balanced character, or iwa-pele. When one has a balanced character, one obtains an alignment with one's Orí or divine self. It is also believed that Orí be worshiped like Orisha. When things are not going right, Orí should be consulted, to make things right Orí should be appeased. This is because whatever one becomes or whatever happens in one's life is as destined by Orí.

== Bibliography ==
- Camara, Louis, 1996. Le choix de l'Ori: conte. Saint-Louis: Xamal.
- Gbadegesin, Segun, 2003. 'Ènìyàn, The Yoruba Concept of a Person', in P.H. Coetzee and A.P.J. Roux (eds) The African Philosophy Reader (2nd ed.), 175-191. (This study originally appeared under the same title in Gbadegesin, Segun, 1991. African philosophy: Traditional Yoruba philosophy and contemporary African realities. New York: Peter Lang, 27-59.)
- Makinde, M.A. 1985. 'A Philosophical analysis of the Yoruba concepts of Ori and human destiny', International Studies in Philosophy, 17, 1, 54-69.
- Ifaloju, A. 2007. ' Ori - The Divine Container of Destiny, Character & Potential, Seed of the Creator ', Ifa Speaks, blog article, Yoruba concepts of destiny & purpose Presented at University of Habana, Cuba - Dept of Anthropology 2007, during sessions teaching traditional Ifa worship - International Ifa Training Institute conference Ifa Speaks Articles.
