= Ifá =

Yoruba divination practice

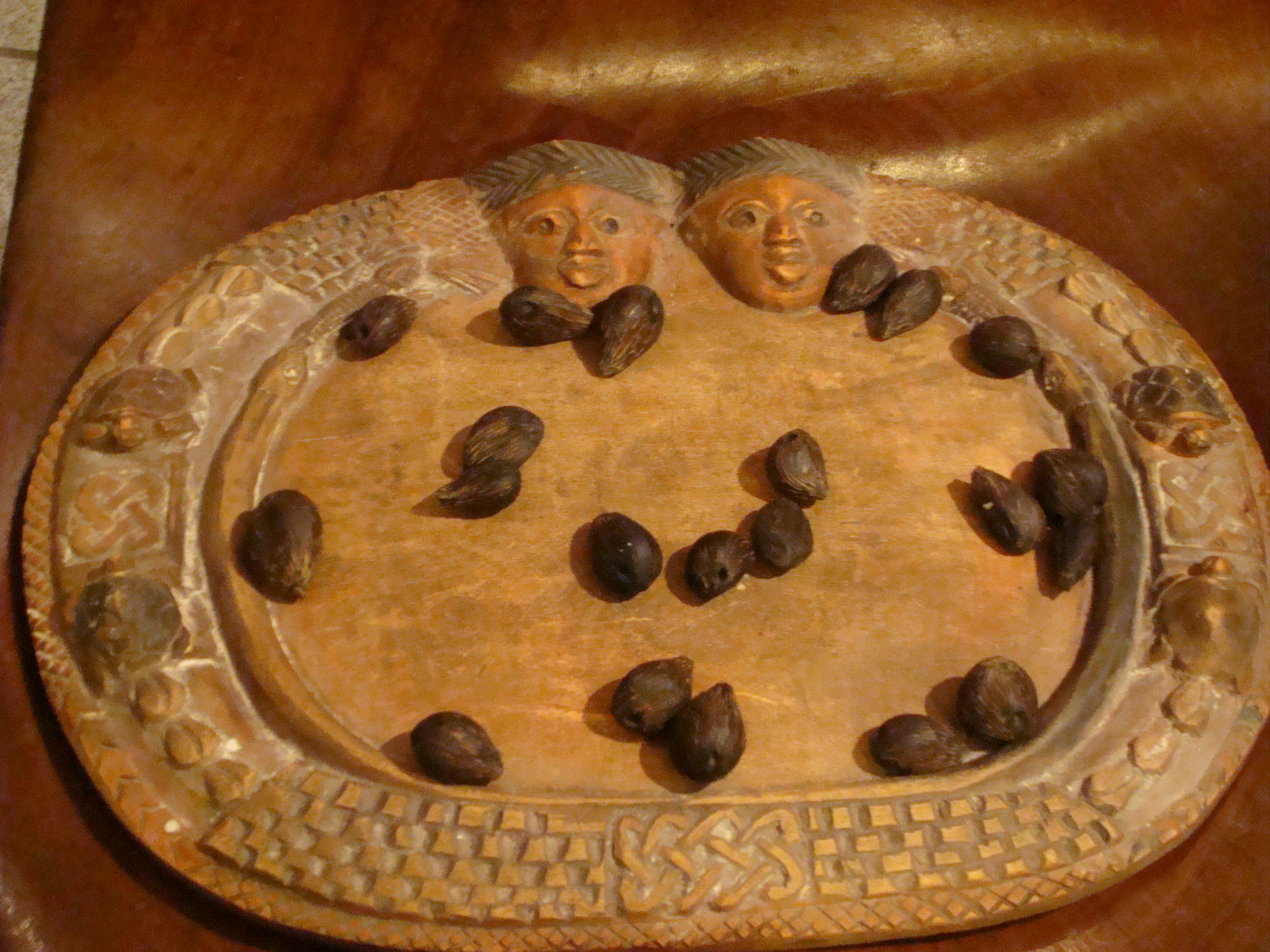
A divination tray (Ọpọ́n Ifá) on which cowrie shells rests, as are used for Ifá divination

Ifá or Fá is a geomantic system originating from Yorubaland in West Africa. It originates within the traditional religion of the Yoruba people. It is also practiced by followers of West African Vodun and certain African diasporic religions such as Cuban Santería.

According to Ifá teaching, the divinatory system is overseen by an orisha called Orunmila, who is believed to have given it to humanity. Ifá is organised as an initiatory tradition, with an initiate called a babaláwo or bokɔnɔ if they're male and ìyánífá if they're female. They are mostly male, but women have also been initiated. Its oracular literary body is made up of 256 volumes (signs) that are divided into two categories, the first called Ojú Odù or main Odù that consists of 16 chapters. The second category is composed of 240 chapters called Amúlù Odù (omoluos), these are composed through the combination of the main Odù. They use either the divining chain known as Ọ̀pẹ̀lẹ̀, or the sacred palm (Elaeis guineensis var. idolatrica) or kola nuts called Ikin, on the wooden divination tray called Ọpọ́n Ifá to mathematically calculate which Odu to use for what problem.

Ifá is first recorded among the Yoruba people of West Africa. The expansion of Yoruba influence over neighbouring peoples resulted in the spread of Ifá, for instance to Fon people practising West African Vodun. As a result of the Atlantic slave trade, enslaved initiates of Ifá were transported to the Americas. There, Ifá survived in Cuba, where it developed an overlap with Afro-Cuban religious traditions such as Santería and Abakuá. Growing transnational links between Africa and the Americas during the 1970s also saw attempts by West African babalawos to train and initiate people in countries like Brazil and the United States.

Tapper (Iroke Ifa), Yoruba, Nigeria, 17th or 18th century. Art Institute of Chicago.

== Definitions ==
According to traditional lore, Ifá began in the city of Ile-Ife in Yorubaland. Since that point, its practice has spread throughout lower Nigeria and westward into coastal Benin and Togo and then in Ghana. It has also been taken to the Americas, where it is practiced within some African diasporic religions.

The term Ifá is the Yoruba language name for the practice. In the Fon language it is called Fá, and among the Ewe and Mina languages it is Afa. The Yoruba system of Ifá is deemed more time consuming, and requires more sacrifices, than the Fá system among the Fon. In the Fon-dominated Ouidah, therefore, some people think of Yoruba Ifá as being more potent than their own local system. Some people who have been initiated into Fon-style Fá thus later go through additional ceremonies to be initiated into Yoruba-style Ifá.

== Belief ==
Sixteen Principal Odu
Name	1	2	3	4
Ogbè	I	I	I	I
Ọ̀yẹ̀kú	II	II	II	II
Ìwòrì	II	I	I	II
Òdí	I	II	II	I
Ìrosùn	I	I	II	II
Ọ̀wọ́nrín	II	II	I	I
Ọ̀bàrà	I	II	II	II
Ọ̀kànràn	II	II	II	I
Ògúndá	I	I	I	II
Ọ̀ṣá	II	I	I	I
Ìká	II	I	II	II
Òtúúrúpọ̀n	II	II	I	II
Òtúrá	I	II	I	I
Ìrẹ̀tẹ̀	I	I	II	I
Ọ̀ṣẹ́	I	II	I	II
Òfún (Ọ̀ràngún)	II	I	II	I

Sixteen Principal Afa-du (Yeveh Vodou)
Name	1	2	3	4
Eji-Ogbe	I	I	I	I
Ọyeku-Meji	II	II	II	II
Iwori-Meji	II	I	I	II
Odi-Meji	I	II	II	I
Irosun-Meji	I	I	II	II
Ọwanrin-Meji	II	II	I	I
Ọbara-Meji	I	II	II	II
Ọkanran-Meji	II	II	II	I
Ogunda-Meji	I	I	I	II
Ọsa-Meji	II	I	I	I
Ika-Meji	II	I	II	II
Oturupon-Meji	II	II	I	II
Otura-Meji	I	II	I	I
Irete-Meji	I	I	II	I
Ọse-Meji	I	II	I	II
Ofun meji	II	I	II	I

=== Theology ===
In Yorubaland, divination gives priests unreserved access to the teachings of Ọ̀rúnmìlà. Among the Fon, Ọ̀rúnmìlà is known as Fá. In the Fon language, fa literally means "coolness" and evokes the concepts of mildness, softness, peacefulness, and equilibrium. This is deemed appropriate because the tutelary practice of the divination system, Fá, is thought to promote coolness and to dislike hot things. Among the Yoruba, this concept of coolness is also important, but is referred to as tutu, a term bearing no linguistic associations with Ifá.

In the West African religions that incorporate Ifá divination, the spirit-deity known among Yoruba people as Eshu-Elegba, Eshu, or Elegbara, is deemed the intermediate communicator relaying Ifá's will both to humanity and to other spirit-deities. Among the Fon, Eshu is termed Legba, and among the Ewe and Mina, he is Elegy. Ifá divination rites provide an avenue of communication to the spiritual realm and the intent of one's destiny.

Among the Fon, it is the female spirit Gbădu who is regarded as the source of Fá's power. She is deemed to be the wife of Fá. Her presence is required for new initiations. She is believed to offer significant protection for people but her veneration is thought dangerous unless a person is initiated. It is for instance believed that women must be kept apart from her presence, for if they get near her they may be struck barren or die.

== System ==
=== Odù Ifá ===
Ifá consists of 256 binary signs. The Yoruba term odù instead appears in Fon as a dù.

In Fon, the sacred palm nuts are called fádékwín. A "divining chain" is referred to in Yoruba as a òpèlè and in Fon as an akplɛ. It may comprise eight halves of a nut, tied together. The way in which it falls then reveals one of 256 possible signs.

To perform the divination, the babalawo will often be seated on a mat. Before casting the divining chain the diviner may sing to call forth Fá. In Fon, the divining tray is called a fátɛ. In West Africa, the quality of the fátɛ may indicate the babalawo's financial success; some who have a small client base may use only a plastic or cardboard tray, while those with access to greater funds may pay for an elaborate, purpose built wooden fátɛ.

Another ritual object is known to the Yoruba as ọ̀pá òòsùn and to the Fon as a fásɛn. This consists of a metal staff, four to five feet tall, that is capped at the top with a metal disk and sometimes a metal rooster. When a fásɛn is created, it is washed in specific leaves and the blood of 16 giant snails; this task is performed by women, secluded from the view of men. Any chickens sacrificed to the fásɛn are only eaten by women.

There are sixteen major books in the Odu Ifá literary corpus. When combined, there are a total of 256 Odu (a collection of sixteen, each of which has sixteen alternatives ⇔ 16^{2}, or 4^{4}) that are believed to reference all situations, circumstances, actions and consequences in life based on the uncountable ese (or "poetic tutorials") relative to the 256 Odu coding. These form the basis of traditional Yoruba spiritual knowledge and are the foundation of all Yoruba divination systems. Ifá proverbs, stories, and poetry are not written down. Rather, they are passed down orally from one babalawo to another. Yoruba people consult Ifá for divine intervention and spiritual guidance.

Among the Yoruba, divination trays are usually circular although can be quadrangular; conversely, this latter shape is most common among those trays used by Fon speakers.

=== Messenger sign ===
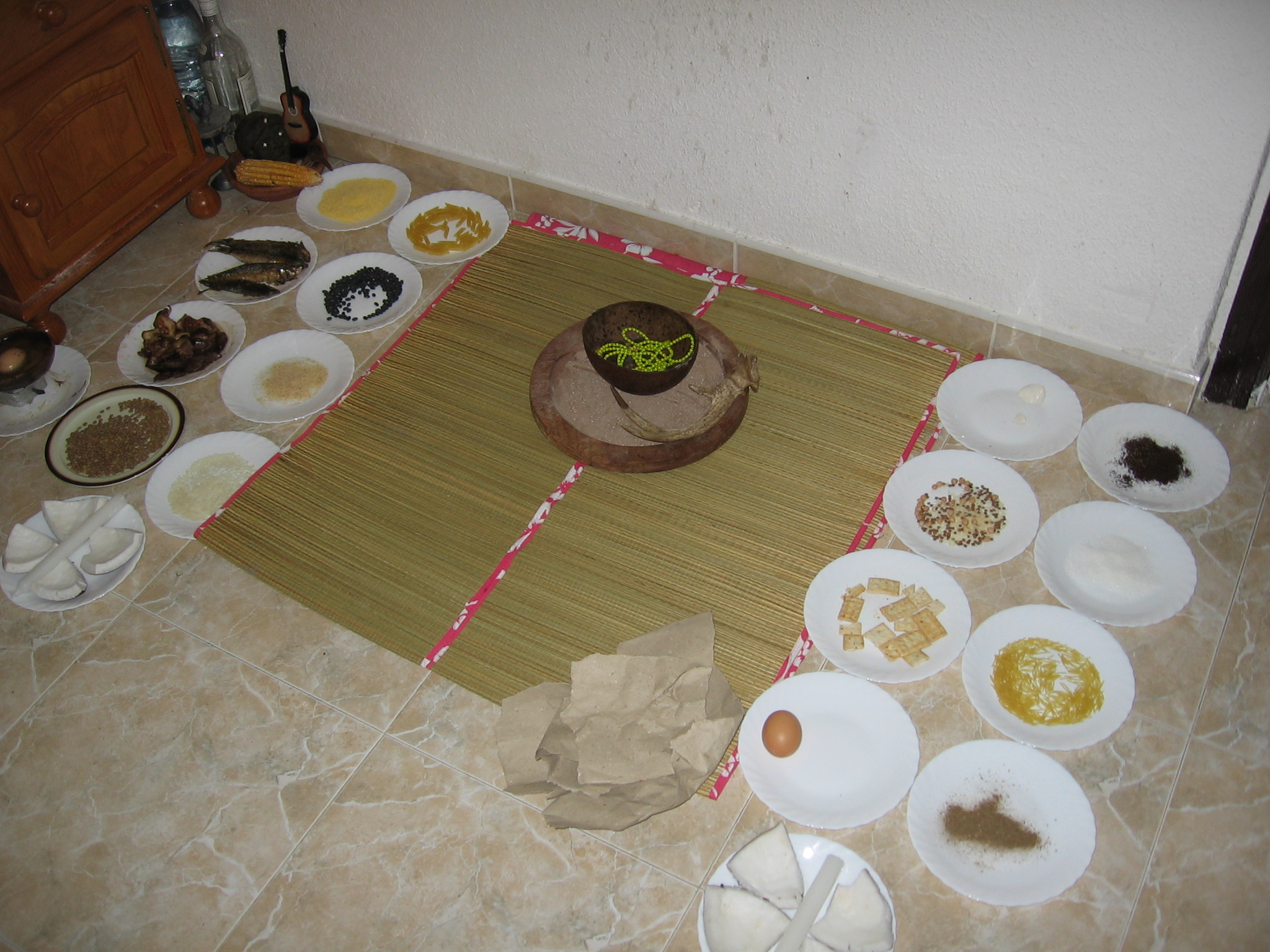
Ceremonial offerings in Afro-Cuban version of Ifá

In addition to the sixteen fundamental signs, Ifá divination includes a major sign, which is the combination of Ọse and Otura, from right to left (Ọse-Tura).

Ọse-Tura
I	I
II	II
I	I
I	II

That sign must be written each time a ritual is performed: Ọse-Tura is the messenger and the carrier of the sacrifice. It is closely associated with the god Èṣù in the system of Ifá. That Messenger sign was known in Arab and Latin medieval geomancy as the Morning Star.

== Babalawos ==
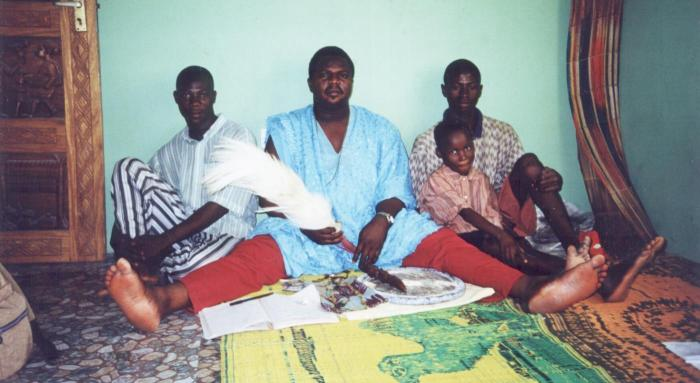
A babalawo photographed in West Africa

An initiate of Ifá is called a babaláwo in Yoruba and a bokɔnɔ in Fon.

Traditionally only heterosexual men are allowed to become babalawos, with women and homosexual males being excluded. Some gay men have nevertheless been initiated; in both Cuba and the United States, for example, several babalawos have initiated their openly gay sons. Moreover, despite the traditional prohibition on women taking on this role, the scholar of religion Mary Ann Clark noted that by the early 21st century, female practitioners were "becoming institutionalized in some religious communities" in the United States, where they were known as either iyalawo (mother of secrets) or iyanifá (mother of Ifá). Female practitioners have also been reported in Mexico.

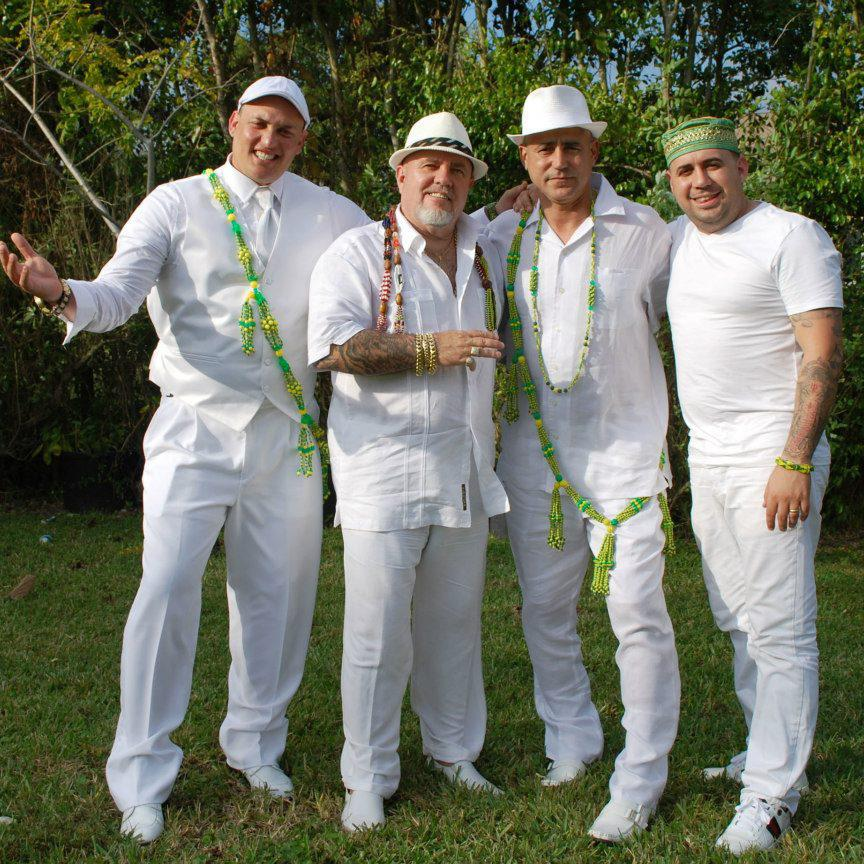
Four Cuban babalawos of Afro-Cuban Ifá practice photographed in 2021

The restriction on female initiation is explained through the story that the oricha Orula was furious that Yemayá, his wife, had used his tabla divining board and subsequently decided to ban women from ever touching it again. Among the Fon, one tradition maintains that women do not need to be initiated into the traditions of the female spirit Gbădu—who is Fá's wife—because they already have the power of creation within them. According to Fon diviners, keeping women and Gbădu apart ensures a conceptual state of coolness. This extends to a taboo on women eating any of the meat from animals sacrificed to Gbădu.

Once an individual is initiated as a babalawo they are given a pot containing various items, including palm nuts, which is believed to be the literal embodiment of Orula. Babalawos provide offerings to Orula, including animal sacrifices and gifts of money. In Cuba, Ifá typically involves the casting of consecrated palm nuts to answer a question. The babalawo then interprets the message of the nuts depending on how they have fallen; there are 256 possible configurations in the Ifá system, which the babalawo is expected to have memorised. Individuals approach the babalawo seeking guidance, often on financial matters, at which the diviner will consult Orula through the established divinatory method. In turn, those visiting the babalawos pay them for their services.

=== Initiation ===
Initiation as a babalawo requires a payment to the initiator and is typically regarded as highly expensive. In Benin, Fá initiation usually takes less than a week, whereas initiations into the cults of other vodún may take several weeks or months. A distinction is made between an initiation that called yǐ Fá ("to receive Fá"), which is often seen as a "first initiation" into Fá's veneration, which offers his protection, and the priestly initiation, at which a person is said to Fázùnyí ("receive Fá's forest").

Among the Fon, the sacred forest of Fá is called fázùn; this is differentiated from ordinary forest by shredded palm fronds, known in Fon as asàn and in Yoruba as màrìwò. It will be here that new initiates are led; they will be accompanied with animals for sacrifice, by existing initiates singing praise songs, and by a person leading the way carrying a fásɛn. A figurine of the spirit Lɛ̌gbà may be brought along for the ritual, invoking this deity to guard the initiates' passage into the forest. Offerings will be given to him, and divination employed to check that he accepts them.

In the forest, the new initiate will be given a kola nut to eat, to bring him in communion with Fá. All present may then place their hands together on the fásɛn, to which a rooster may then be sacrificed. The newcomer's eyes will be washed in a herbal mixture called Gbădùsin. The neophyte will then be blindfolded and then led into the sacred grove of the fázùn, where the secret teachings of Fá are revealed to them. Divination will be used to determine under which of the 256 signs their priesthood will be born. The selected sign indicates to which spirits they should pay particular attention and to which taboos they must observe. This may involve avoiding eating certain foods, wearing certain colors, or engaging in specific actions. The initiate's head will then be shaved as a symbol of their initiation and they will be ritually bathed and wrapped in white cloth. A celebration follows, in which a goat may be sacrificed to Fá and the participants eat its meat.

The initiate may receive a small bundle, the kpɔli, containing secret ingredients corresponding to their personal du. They may also receive a small vessel to house their palm nuts and a small stone, the ken, to protect them from witchcraft.

== History ==
=== West African origins ===
The 16-principle system has its earliest history in West Africa. Each Niger–Congo-speaking ethnic group which practices it has their own myth of origin; Yoruba religion suggests that it was founded by Orunmila in Ilé-Ifẹ̀ when he initiated himself and then he initiated his students, Akoda and Aseda. According to the book The History of the Yorubas from the Earliest of Times to the British Protectorate (1921) by Nigerian historian Samuel Johnson and Obadiah Johnson, it was Arugba, the mother of Onibogi, the 8th Alaafin of Oyo, who introduced Oyo to Ifá in the late 1400s. She initiated the Alado of Ado and conferred on him the right to initiate others. The Alado, in turn, initiated the priests of Oyo and that was how Ifá came to be in the Oyo empire.

Ifá originated among the Yoruba peoples. The linguist Wande Abimbola argued that Ifá probably derived from a simpler divinatory system, dilogun; this contrasts with the belief of some babalawos that dilogun was based on Ifá.

Between circa 1727 and 1823, the kingdom of Dahomey was a vassal state of the Yoruba-dominated Oyo Empire to the east, thus resulting in much religious interchange. In this period, the Fon people of Dahomey adopted Ifá as well as the Orò and Egungun cults from the Yoruba. Ifá was present in Dahomey by the reign of its fifth ruler, Tegbesú, who ruled from c.1732 to 1774, and was well established at the royal palace by the reign of Gezò, which lasted from 1818 to 1858.

According to William Bascom, "an indication of the importance of Ifá to the [Yoruba] religious system as a whole is the fact that the most striking religious syncretisms resulting from European contact are to be found in a church established in Lagos in 1934, the Ijọ Ọ̀rúnmila Adulawọ, which was founded on the premise that the teachings of Ifa constitute the Yoruba Bible." It was also set up in Porto-Novo (Benin) the same year. According to Erwan Dianteill, the Church of Ifá is still active in 2024, in Nigeria and Benin, with around 2000 followers in Lagos, Porto-Novo and Cotonou.

Of the foreigners coming to West Africa for initiation into Vodún, the largest group sought initiation into Fá.

=== In Cuba ===
In Cuba, Ifá came to be used in the Afro-Cuban religion of Santería. There, it is the most complex and prestigious divinatory system used in the religion. The two are closely linked, sharing the same mythology and conception of the universe, with Orula or Ọ̀rúnmila having a prominent place within Santería. In Cuba, Ifá nevertheless also retains a separate existence from Santería. Many Cuban babalawos are also santeros, or male initiates of Santería, although it is not uncommon for babalawos to perceive themselves as being superior to santeros. Although the presence of babalawos is not required for Santería ceremonies, they often attend in their capacity as diviners. Other Cuban babalawos have been initiates of the Abakuá society.

At the time of the Cuban Revolution in 1959, there were an estimated 200 babalawos active on Cuba; by the 1990s, Cuban babalawos were claiming that they numbered tens of thousands on the island. In the 1980s, Cuban babalawos created the organisation Ifá Yesterday, Ifá Today, Ifá Tomorrow, the first Cuban institution to represent the priesthood of an Afro-Cuban religion. Following the Soviet Union's collapse in the 1990s, Cuba's government declared that the island was entering a "Special Period" in which new economic measures would be necessary. As part of this, it selectively supported Afro-Cuban and Santería traditions, partly out of a desire to boost tourism; priests of Santería, Ifá, and Palo all took part in government-sponsored tours for foreigners desiring initiation into such traditions.

=== In the United States ===
Cuban migrants took Ifá to the United States. There, during the 1960s, a small group of babalawos dominated the Santería scene in New York. Their dominance was challenged by new Cuban migrants who arrived between 1965 and 1973 and who, although initiated santeros and santeras, were not babalawos. The ethnomusicologist María Teresa Vélez noted that "two types of ocha house arose: those that still relied on the babalaos and did not question any of their prerogatives, and those that became independent of the babalaos for most of their ritual activities," with these latter houses often being run by women.

In 1978, Ifá ceremonies took place in Miami, Florida, overseen by the Nigerian babalawo Ifayẹmi Elébùìbọn Awise of Osogbo. He was assisted in this by two Cuban babalawos, Luis Fernández-Pelón and José-Miguel Gómez, both of whom were Abakuá members. In the 1980s, the Chicago-based Philip and Vassa Neimark established their Ifa Foundation of North and Latin America. Departing from established tradition, they offered "bloodless" initiations that welcomed those who were unwilling to engage in animal sacrifice. Claims have been made that the first woman initiated into Ifá was the Jewish American Dr. D'Haifa Odufora Ifatogun Ina Arara Agbaye.

=== In Brazil ===
Although surviving in Cuban Santería, Ifá did not remain part of a Brazilian religion that owed much to Yoruba traditions, Candomblé. In Candomblé, dilogun instead forms the primary method of divination employed by its initiates. One of the earliest practitioners of Ifá in Brazil was the French ethnographer Pierre Verger, who had become a babalawo in West Africa and who was also involved in Candomblé.

As a result of growing links between Brazil and Nigeria, in the 1970s various educational efforts to promote understandings of Yoruba culture were established in Brazilian cities. This included the Yoruba Culture Research and Study Centre, founded in 1977 by Fernandes Portugal, and which brought in Nigerian teachers to run a course teaching Ifá. The closing ceremony took place in January 1978, attended by 14 students who were granted the status of omo (son of) Ifá. One of these pupils, a Candomblé initiate named José Nilton Vianna Reis (Torodê de Ogun), later went on to become a babalawo nine years later, before setting out his own Ifá teaching course in 1984.

== Reception ==
In 2005, UNESCO proclaimed Ifá as one of the "Masterpieces of the Oral and Intangible Heritage of Humanity", later incorporated into the Representative List of the Intangible Cultural Heritage of Humanity in 2008 "Masterpieces of the Oral and Intangible Heritage of Humanity".

== See also ==
- Opon Ifá
- Iroke Ifá
- Odu Ifa
- Yoruba religion
