= OBA =

Oba or OBA may refer to:

== Science, technology, business, management ==
- Office Business Applications, software which uses applications within the Microsoft Office system
- On base average, a baseball statistic
- Online Behavioral Advertising, a range of technologies and techniques used by online website publishers and advertisers
- Optical Brightening Agent, a type of dye used in fabric and paper
- Output-based aid, a type of aid to support the delivery of public services in developing countries
- Out-of-band agreement, in communications
- Oxygen Breathing Apparatus, an oxygen supply system used by the US Navy for firefighting

== Organisations and institutions ==
- Oklahoma Bible Academy, a Christian secondary institution in Enid, Oklahoma, U.S.
- Oklahoma Bankers Association, a trade association in Oklahoma, U.S.
- Oklahoma Bar Association, the state bar (legal association) of Oklahoma, U.S.
- One Bermuda Alliance, a Bermuda political party
- Only Boys Aloud, Welsh male voice choir
- Ontario Bar Association
- Openbare Bibliotheek Amsterdam, the public library of Amsterdam
- Ormiston Bolingbroke Academy, a school in Runcorn, England

== People ==
- Oba (ruler), a Yoruba title for Kings and Royals
  - Oba of Lagos
  - Oba of Benin
- Ōba, a Japanese surname
- Oba Chandler (1946–2011), an American murderer executed in 2011
- Oba Femi, a Nigerian-born professional wrestler of Yoruba heritage signed with WWE
- Pierre Oba, Congolese official

== Places ==
- Oba, Ontario a remote hamlet in Ontario, Canada
- Oba Island, in Vanuatu
- Oba-Igbomina, a town in Nigeria
- Oba, Anambra, a town in Anambra State, Nigeria
- Oba River, a river in Nigeria
- Orange Beach, Alabama
- Oba, Indonesia - that part of the administered area of the town of Tidore lying on Halmahera Island
- Oba Market, Historical market at Ring Road in Edo State, Nigeria

== Other ==
- Oba: The Last Samurai, a 2011 Japanese film
- Oba (orisha), a Yoruba deity prominent in various African traditional religions and Afro-American religions
- One Big Beautiful Bill Act, a U.S. bill commonly abbreviated as OBBBA

== See also ==
- Ago-Oba, an electoral ward in the city of Abeokuta, Ogun State, Nigeria
- Obba (disambiguation)
