= Bob Cullison =

American politician (1936–2021)

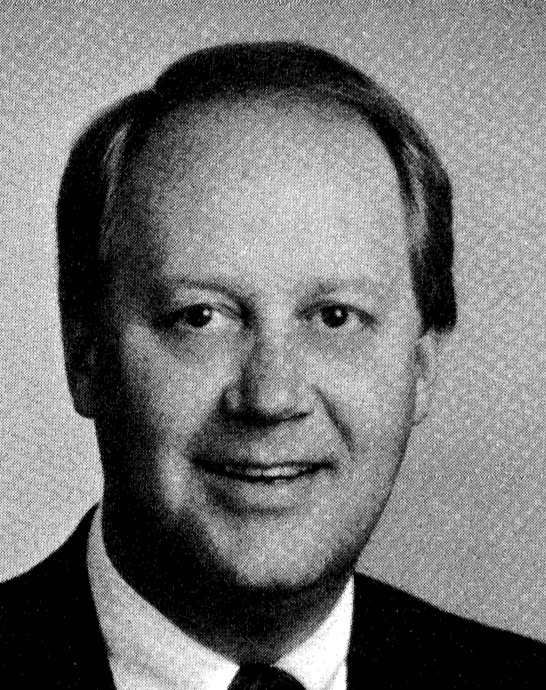

Member of the Oklahoma Tax Commission
- In office February 21, 1995 – August 1, 1997
- Preceded by: Bob Wadley
- Succeeded by: Jerry Johnson

President pro tempore of the Oklahoma Senate
- In office January 5, 1988 – 1995
- Preceded by: Rodger Randle
- Succeeded by: Stratton Taylor

Member of the Oklahoma Senate from the 34th district
- In office 1979–1995
- Preceded by: Bob Shatwell
- Succeeded by: Grover Campbell

Member of the Oklahoma House of Representatives from the 74th district
- In office 1973–1979
- Preceded by: Jerry Hargrave
- Succeeded by: Rodney Hargrave

Personal details
- Born: Robert Virl Cullison; December 22, 1936; Turley, Oklahoma, U.S.
- Died: May 18, 2021 (aged 84)
- Political party: Democratic
- Spouse: Cleo Francilla Cranford
- Children: 2
- Education: Baylor University (BS)

Military service
- Branch/service: United States Marine Corps
- Unit: United States Marine Corps Reserve

Robert Virl Cullison (December 22, 1936 – May 18, 2021) was an American politician who served in the Oklahoma House of Representatives from the 74th district from 1973 to 1979, in the Oklahoma Senate from the 34th district from 1979 to 1995, and as President pro tempore of the Oklahoma Senate from 1988 to 1995, as a member of the Democratic Party.

== Early life and education ==
Cullison was born in Turley, Oklahoma, on December 22, 1936, to O. G. Cullison and Georgia Lucille. Cullison graduated from Baylor University with a degree in business administration and served in the United States Marine Corps Reserve. He married Cleo Francilla Cranford, with whom he had two children, on October 26, 1963.

== Career ==
=== Oklahoma House of Representatives ===
Cullison served in the Oklahoma House of Representatives from 1973 to 1979. During the 1976 election Cullison faced a primary challenge from Billy Mack Rountree.

Cullison was appointed to serve on the six-member Wildlife Task Force Committee in 1976.

=== Oklahoma Senate ===
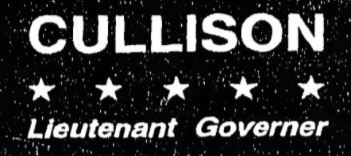
Bob Cullison's lieutenant gubernatorial campaign logo

On May 30, 1978, Cullison announced that he would seek the Democratic nomination for a seat in the Oklahoma Senate that was held by Democratic Senator Bob Shatwell, who was facing charges of perjury after he stated that he was kidnapped and robbed in 1977. Shatwell ran for reelection and was found innocent of the perjury charges. Cullison won the primary against three other candidates and a recount, ordered by Shatwell who paid the $500 fee, ruled that Cullison had won.

He was appointed to serve on the Wildlife Task Force Committee in 1980. Cullison served as vice-chair of the Business and Labor committee.

Cullison and Speaker Glen D. Johnson Jr. filed a lawsuit to the Oklahoma Supreme Court to challenge two partial vetoes done by Governor David Walters against two pieces of legislation in 1991. House Bill 1271, which was appropriated $4 million to multiple agencies, saw parts of the bill that dealing with space and the negotiation of the purchase of a warehouse vetoed. House Bill 1743, which gave authorization for the Oklahoma Water Resources Board to sell its surplus water from the Sardis Reservoir, saw parts of the bill that dealt with space allocation at the Oklahoma State Capitol building vetoed. Walters stated that he had the right to use a line-item veto as both bills had multiple subjects which violated the Constitution of Oklahoma, but Cullison and Johnson stated that the constitution did not give Walters the right to choose which parts of a substantive bill to pass. The Oklahoma Corporation Commission voted two to one in favor of supporting Walters in the lawsuit and Assistant Attorney General Neal Leader filed a brief in support of Walters. The Supreme Court ruled that Walters had no authority to veto non-appropriation sections of legislation while approving non-appropriation sections in the same piece of legislation, but the court also restricted logrolling by the legislature.

In 1986, Cullison was selected by the Democratic caucus to succeed Rodger Randle as President pro tempore of the Oklahoma Senate, who was retiring, starting in 1989. However, he became the President pro tempore on January 5, 1988, instead as Randle had left the office to run for mayor of Tulsa. He was appointed to serve another two years as President pro tempore in 1990. He was given an additional two years later in 1990, which made him the longest serving leader in Oklahoma's history at the time. In 1995, Stratton Taylor succeeded Cullison as President pro tempore following Cullison's unsuccessful lieutenant gubernatorial campaign.

Cullison announced that he would not run in the 1994 gubernatorial election and would instead seek reelection to the state senate. However, he later announced that he would run for the Democratic nomination for Lieutenant Governor of Oklahoma. During the campaign he was endorsed by the Oklahoma Fraternal Order of Police and by the Oklahoma Education Association. Larry Weatherford served as Cullison's campaign manager. He called for Nance Diamond, his opponent in the lieutenant gubernatorial primary runoff, to be prosecuted by the Oklahoma Ethics Commission for not disclosing some of her campaign contributions. Cullison placed second to Nance Diamond in the initial primary, but lost in the runoff election. Diamond lost in the general election to Republican nominee Mary Fallin.

=== Later career ===
Governor Walters appointed Cullison to replace Bob Wadley on the Oklahoma Tax Commission in 1994. On December 20, Oklahoma County District Attorney Robert H. Macy asked for the Oklahoma State Bureau of Investigation to start an investigation into stock transaction that involved Cullison, Senator Cal Hobson, former city councilor Pete White, and lobbyist Mike Williams. Cullison and Hobson both received $4,117 from Williams that involved the stock of a company which wanted legislation passed. Governor Frank Keating asked for Cullison's nomination to the tax commission to be delayed until the inquiry was completed. Despite the investigation, Cullison was approved by the state senate by a vote of 34 to 12. A grand jury voted in 1996, to not indict Hobson, Cullison, White, and Williams for the transactions, but called for legislators and public officials to be barred from business dealings with lobbyists.

Cullison served on the three-member tax commission until his resignation on August 1, 1997, and he was replaced by Jerry Johnson, a Democrat who was appointed by Keating. He became the director of state government relations for the Oklahoma Bankers Association and became executive vice-president in the organization. Cullison died on May 18, 2021.

== Political positions ==
Cullison refused to allow legislation which required the chemical castration of sex offenders to be considered in the Oklahoma Senate, stating that it would hurt the image of Oklahoma and that chemical castration was not a solution.

== Electoral history ==
1978 Oklahoma Senate 34th district Democratic primary
Party	Candidate	Votes	%
Democratic	Bob Cullison	3,721	50.69%
Democratic	Bob Shatwell (incumbent)	1,622	22.10%
Democratic	Carl Ruff	1,089	14.84%
Democratic	Art Nave	908	12.37%
Total votes		7,340	100.00%

1994 Oklahoma Lieutenant Governor Democratic primary
Party	Candidate	Votes	%
Democratic	Nance Diamond	156,624	36.80%
Democratic	Bob Cullison	118,210	27.78%
Democratic	Dave McBride	101,533	23.86%
Democratic	Walt Roberts	49,207	11.56%
Total votes		425,574	100.00%

1994 Oklahoma Lieutenant Governor Democratic runoff primary
Party	Candidate	Votes	%
Democratic	Nance Diamond	210,031	56.32%
Democratic	Bob Cullison	162,920	43.68%
Total votes		372,951	100.00%
