= Oba River =

River in Nigeria

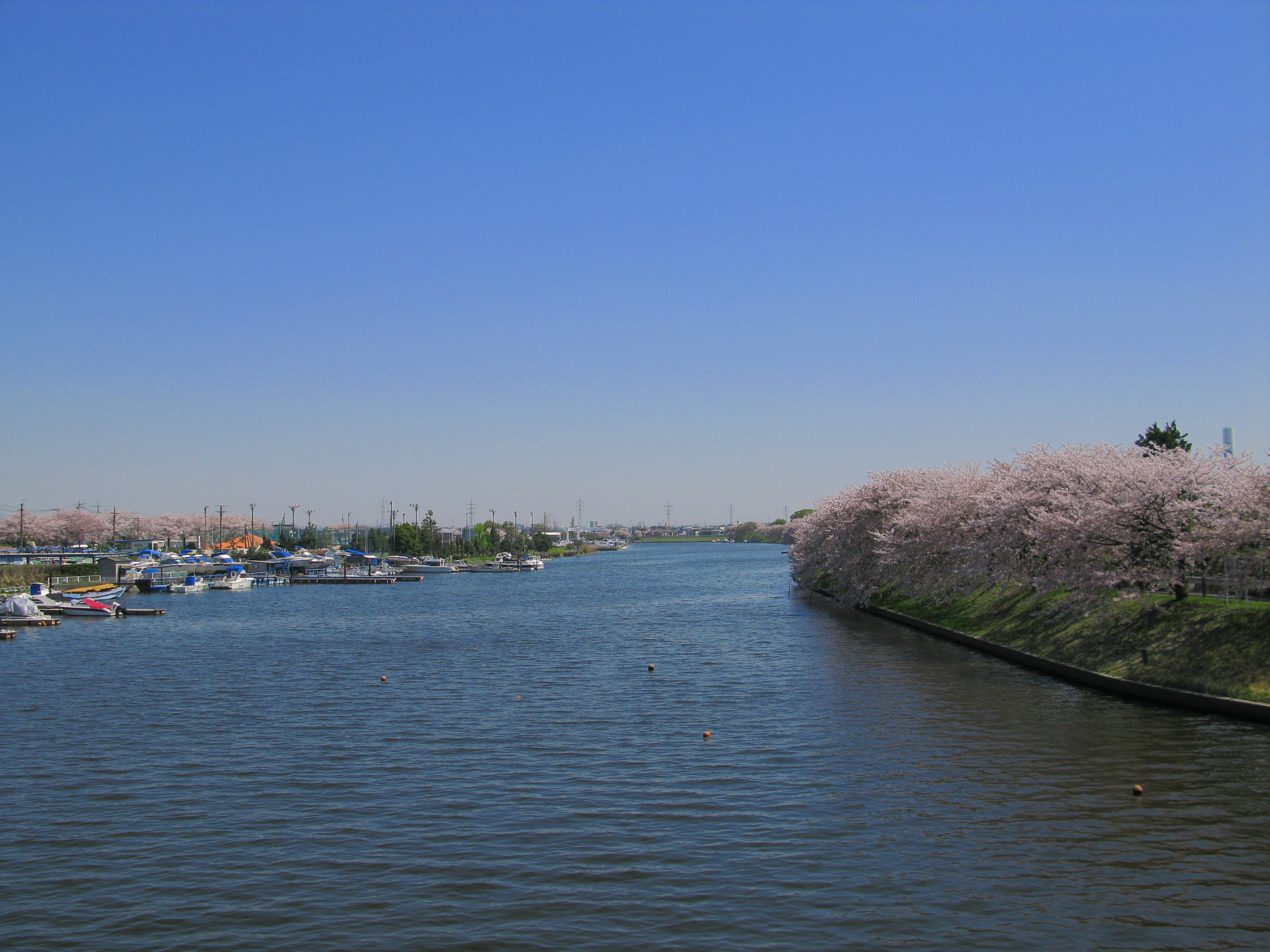

- Course of the Oba River

Location
- Country: Nigeria
- State: Osun State

Physical characteristics
- Source
  - coordinates: 8.314248°N 4.220588°E
- Mouth
  - coordinates: 7.473872°N 4.145651°E

Basin features
- River system: Osun River

The Oba River (Yoruba: Odo Ọba) is a river in Oyo and Osun States in Nigeria. It is the main tributary of the Osun River. The landscape varies from wooded savanna in the north to rain forest in the south. Most of the people who live along its length practice farming and fishing.

== Name ==
The Ọba River is named for the goddess Ọba, one of the wives of Shango, the Yoruba god of thunder. His other wives were Ọshun and Ọya. According to legend, Ọshun tricked Ọba into cutting off her ear and adding it to Shango's food, saying it would please him. When Shango found out what Ọba had done he, furious, screamed and Osun and Oba fled frightened, turning into the two rivers. That is why the meeting point of the Osun and Oba rivers is so rushing.

== Course ==
The Oba River is the main tributary of the Osun River. It rises about 15 kilometres (9 mi) north of Ogbomosho in Oyo State. The river flows past Ogbomosho, where it is dammed. The Ogbomoso Reservoir on the Oba River was completed in 1964, covers an area of 137.6 hectares (340 acres) and has a storage capacity of 3,520 megalitres (124×10^{6} cu ft). The dam is fed by the Idekun, Eeguno, Akanbi Kemolowo, Omoogun and Yàkù streams, and has a catchment area of 321 square kilometres (124 sq mi).

The Oba continues south from the dam until it joins the Oshun River just above the settlement of Odo Oba. Settlements along its course from north to south include Apo, Iluju, Obada, Mosunmade, Otuokun, Bale, Olori and Olumoye. The river receives a left tributary just downstream from Obada and another left tributary to the south of Olori. The second tributary flows past Ife Odan. The Ọba River joins the Ọ̀ṣun River in a series of rapids. The two rivers meet at the northern end of the Asejire Reservoir.

== Environment ==
The climate in the upper part of the river around Ogbomoso has consistently high temperatures, with moderate to heavy rainfall in March–July. Annual rainfall averages 1,247 millimetres (49.1 in). The vegetation is derived savanna, between the northern savanna zone and the Ibadan region rain forests. A study published in 2014 found that the fish in the Ogbomoso Reservoir were infected with parasites that could cause a risk to human consumers. The Oba River is heavily polluted, at class V on the Prati scale. There is little or no dissolved oxygen in the water. Sources of pollution include sewage and domestic and market waste, and includes much inert matter that is not readily biodegradable.

== Economy ==
The people along the whole length of the Oba River are mostly engaged in farming and fishing. In 1977 the land use around the Ogbomoso Reservoir was 71.9% forest, 4.9% arable and 23.2% fallow. By 1992 land use was 23.5% forest, 60.5% arable and 16.0% fallow. The main crops were maize and vegetables, particularly okra. Farmers were making heavy use of nitrogenous fertiliser. In 2014 farm workers from northern Nigeria had started to practice irrigation farming in the Oba River basin at Ikose, Ogbomoso North Local Government and Iluju, Ikoyi-Ile, Orire Local Government in Oyo State. They were using pumps to take water from the Oba River, often piping it a kilometre or more to their farmland. Crops include vegetables, okra, maize, garden eggs and water melon. The farmers were finding a ready market with buyers from Osun, Ondo and Oyo states. Irrigation farming is unusual in the region since rainfall is fairly plentiful, but is common in the northern states where the farmers originate.
