= Obba =

Obba may refer to:

- Obba (town), an ancient town and former bishopric in the Roman province of Africa, now a Latin Catholic titular see
- Oba (goddess), a Yoruba goddess

Biology

- Obba (fungus), a fungus genus in the order Polyporales
- Obba (gastropod), a genus of land snail in the family Camaenidae
- Obba, a synonym for Ugia, a genus of moths

People

- Obba Babatundé (born 1950), American stage and movie actor

Legislation

- One Big Beautiful Bill Act, a U.S. bill commonly abbreviated as OBBBA

== See also ==
- Oba (disambiguation)
