= Osun-Osogbo =

Osun-Osogbo Sacred Grove
UNESCO World Heritage Site
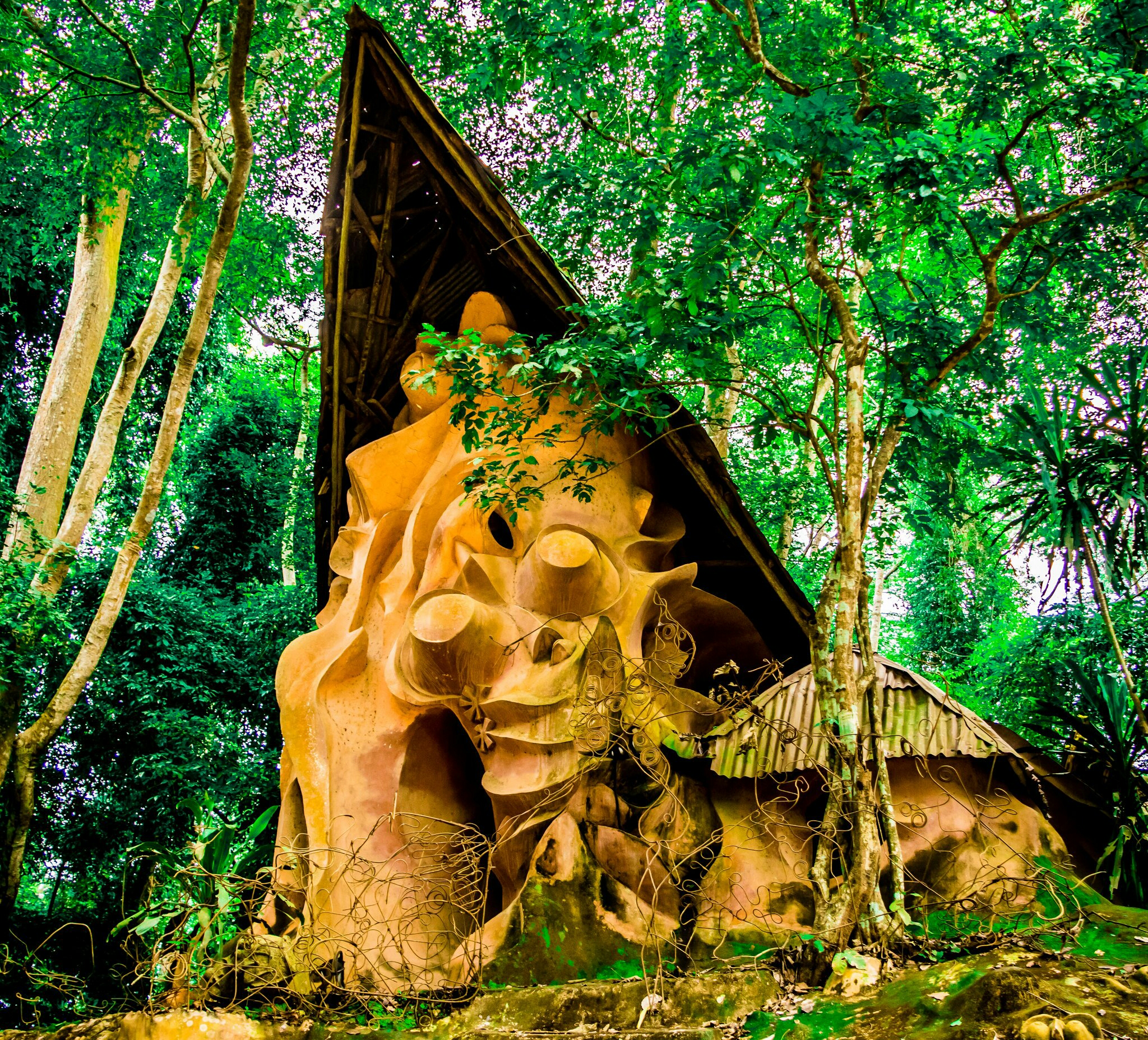
- Palace in Osun-Osogbo Sacred Grove

- Location within Nigeria
- Location: Osogbo, Nigeria
- Criteria: Cultural: (ii), (iii), (vi)
- Reference: 1118
- Inscription: 2005 (29th Session)
- Area: 75 ha (190 acres)
- Buffer zone: 47 ha (120 acres)
- Coordinates: 7°45′20″N 4°33′08″E

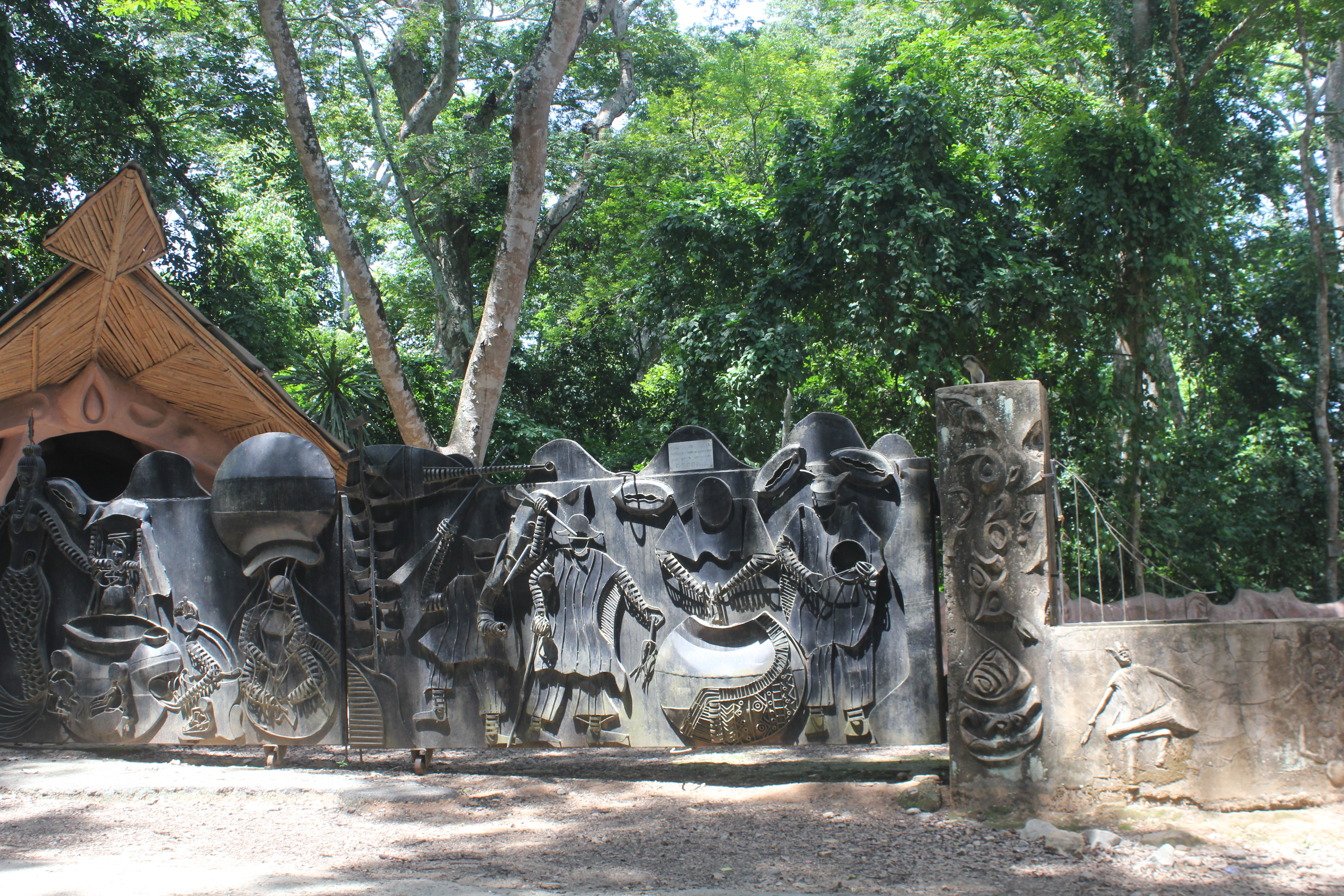
Osun-Osogbo Main Entrance Gate

Osun-Osogbo is a sacred grove along the banks of the Osun river just outside the city of Osogbo, Osun State of Nigeria.

The Osun-Osogbo Grove is several centuries old and is among the last of the sacred forests that once adjoined the edges of most Yoruba cities before extensive urbanization. In recognition of its global significance and cultural value, the Sacred Grove was inscribed as a UNESCO World Heritage Site in 2005.

The 1950s witnessed the desecration of the Osun-Osogbo Grove: shrines were neglected and priests abandoned the grove as customary responsibilities and sanctions weakened. Prohibited actions like fishing, hunting and felling of trees in the Grove was done indiscriminately until an Austrian national named Susanne Wenger (1915–2009) helped to reinstate traditional protections.

With the support and encouragement of the Ataoja (the royal king of the time) and the support of the concerned local people. Wenger "formed the New Sacred Art movement to challenge land speculators, repel poachers, protect shrines and begin the long process of bringing the sacred place back to life by establishing it again, as the sacred heart of Osogbo". Wenger later came to be honoured with the title "Adunni Olorisha" for her custodial efforts and her consistent devotion to the gods of the grove.

== Osun-Osogbo Festival ==
Ever since that year, the Osun-Osogbo Festival has been celebrated in August at the Grove. The festival attracts thousands of Osun worshippers, spectators and tourists from all over the world.

=== History of the Festival ===
Osun-Osogbo Festival is believed to have a history of more than 700 years. Historically, an ancestral occurrence led to the celebration of this festival. According to tradition, a group of migrants who were led by a great hunter called Olutimehin once settled on the bank of the Osun river to save themselves from famine. On the river-side, Yeye Ọṣun the river goddess appeared from the water in front of Olutimehin and requested him to lead people to a special place (the present-day Osogbo town). The goddess promised to protect the group and bring them prosperity in return for an annual sacrifice to her. The group accepted the proposition, and today the annual sacrifice to the Osun River Goddess is still celebrated as the Osun-Osogbo Festival.

=== Celebrations ===
In modern times, August is a month of celebration for the people of Osogbo land that includes the traditional cleansing of the city and the cultural reunion of the people with their ancestors, the founders of the Osogbo Kingdom.

The Osun-Osogbo Festival itself is a two-week-long programme. The traditional cleansing of Osogbo is called 'Iwopopo', which is followed after three days by the lighting of the 500-year-old sixteen-point lamp called 'Ina Olojumerindinlogun'(16 face lamp). Then comes the 'Iboriade', an assemblage of the crowns of the past rulers, the Ataojas of Osogbo, for blessings.

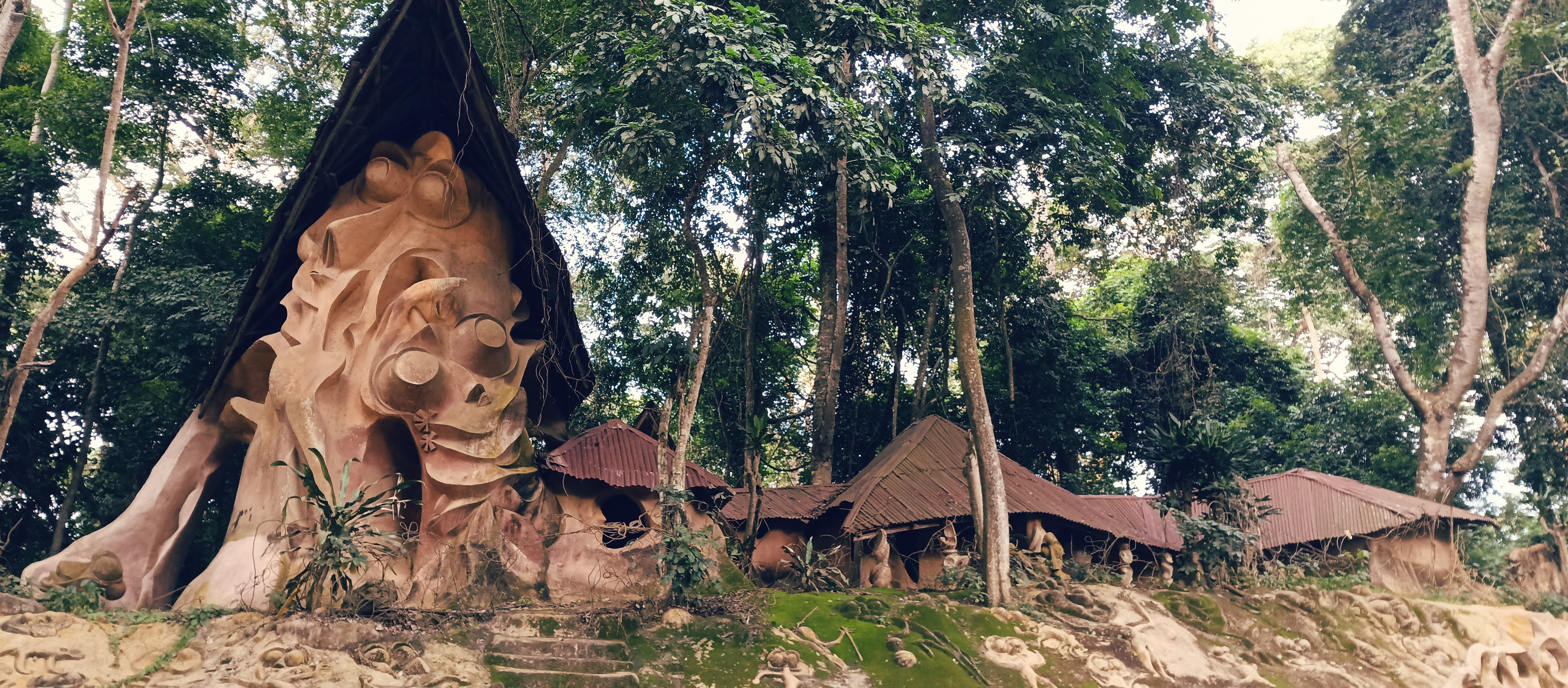
Wood hut

The Festival culminates in a procession to the shrine in the sacred grove where a large crowd builds up. Drumming, dancing, musical performing, wearing elaborate costumes, speaking of the Yoruba language, recitation of praise poetry, and so on add pomp and colour to the proceedings. This event is led by the sitting Ataoja of Osogbo along with a ritualized performer called the Arugba(calabash carrier) and a committee of priestesses, who reenact the very first meeting between Oluwatimilehin and Yeye Osun. Arugba is played by a young woman of a kingly lineage who offer the sacrifice to the deity.

In 2020, the procession was limited to the ritual performers and public participation was suspended due to COVID-19.

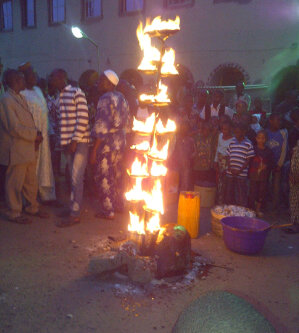
Ina, the sacred lamp lit at the beginning of the annual Osun-Osogbo festival

== Gallery ==
=== Osun Princess ===
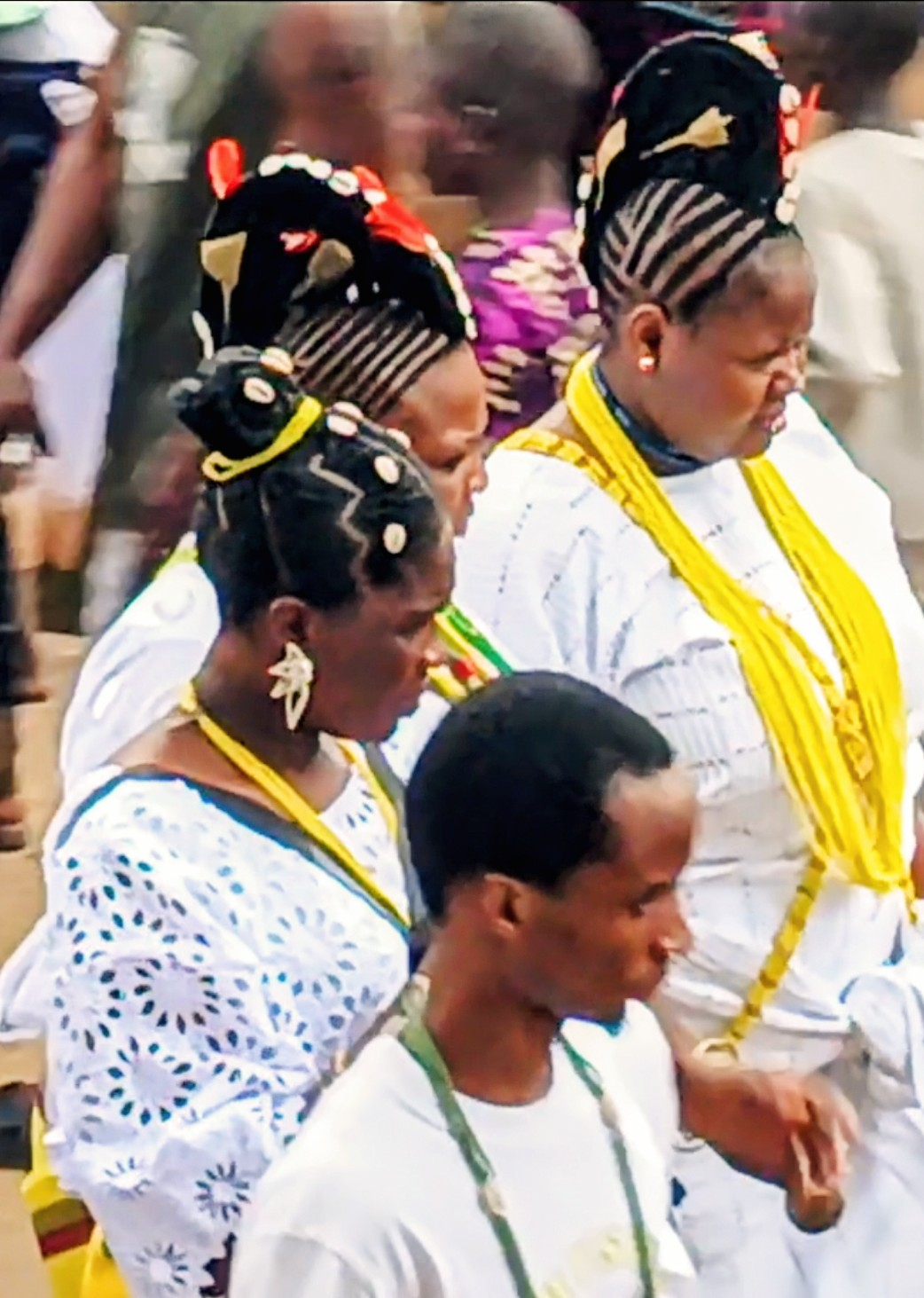
Osun Princesses and a male guard

=== Ritual and Procession ===
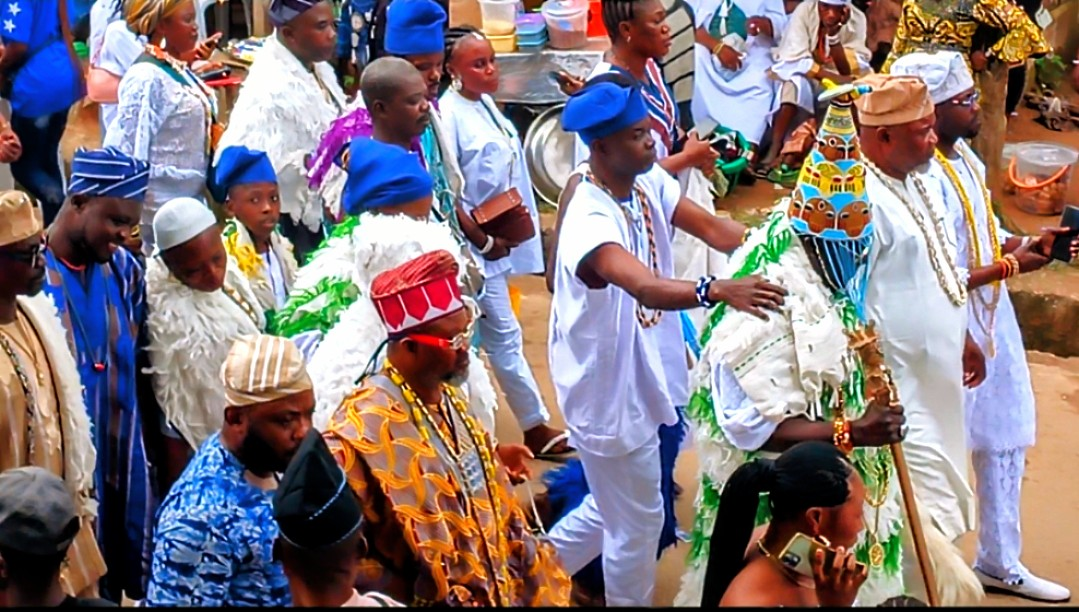
Osun Devotees Procession

=== Agba Aje ===
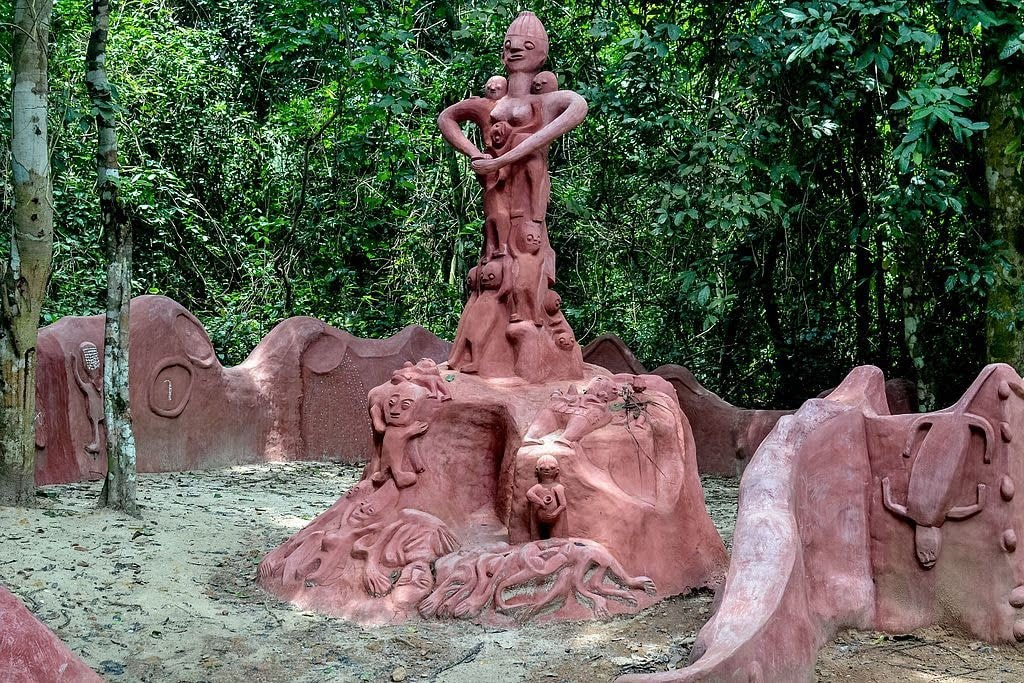
A statue signifying the maternity nature of Iya Ọṣun at the sacred grove of Osun

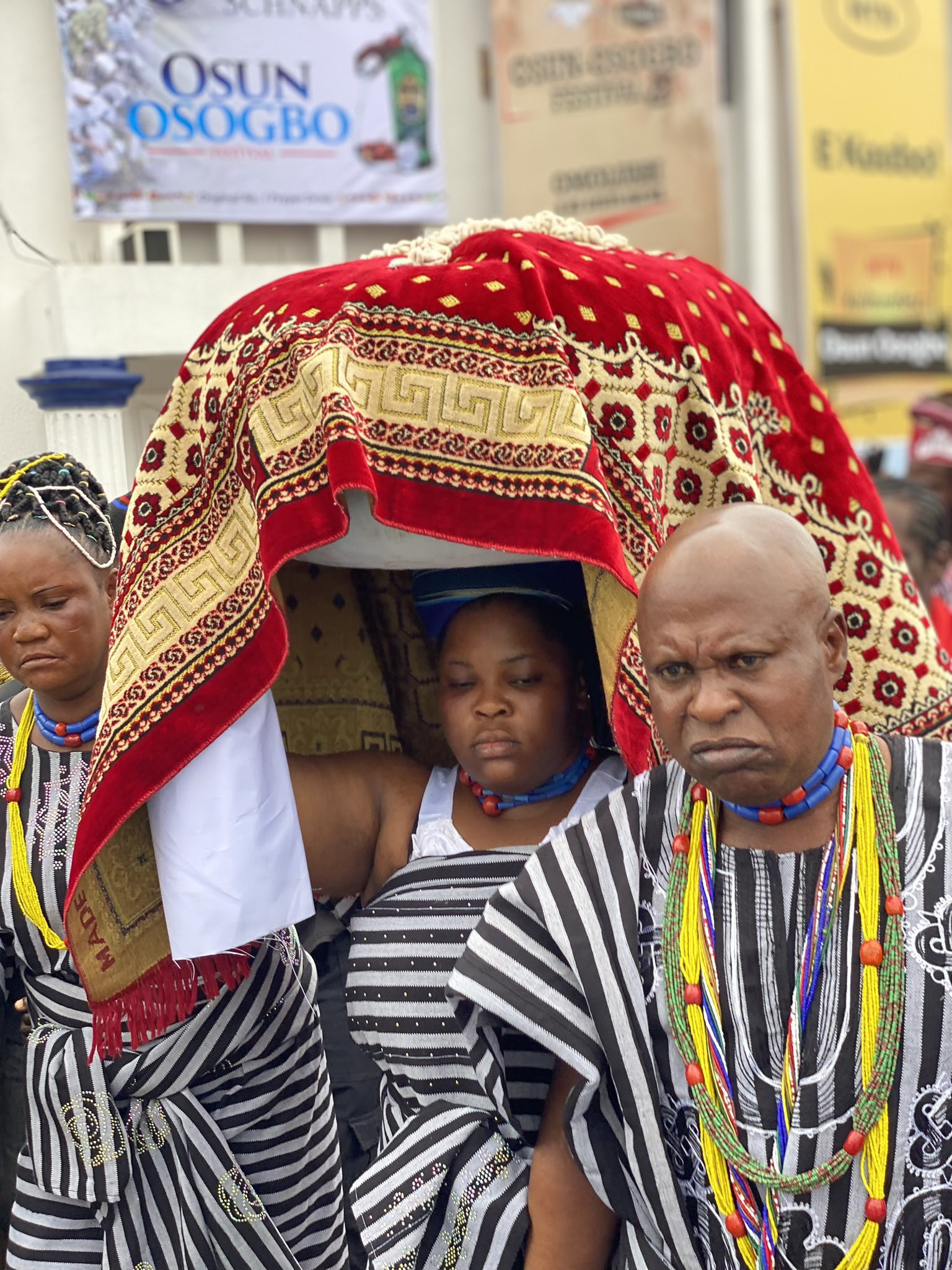
Arugba; during one of the annual festivals.

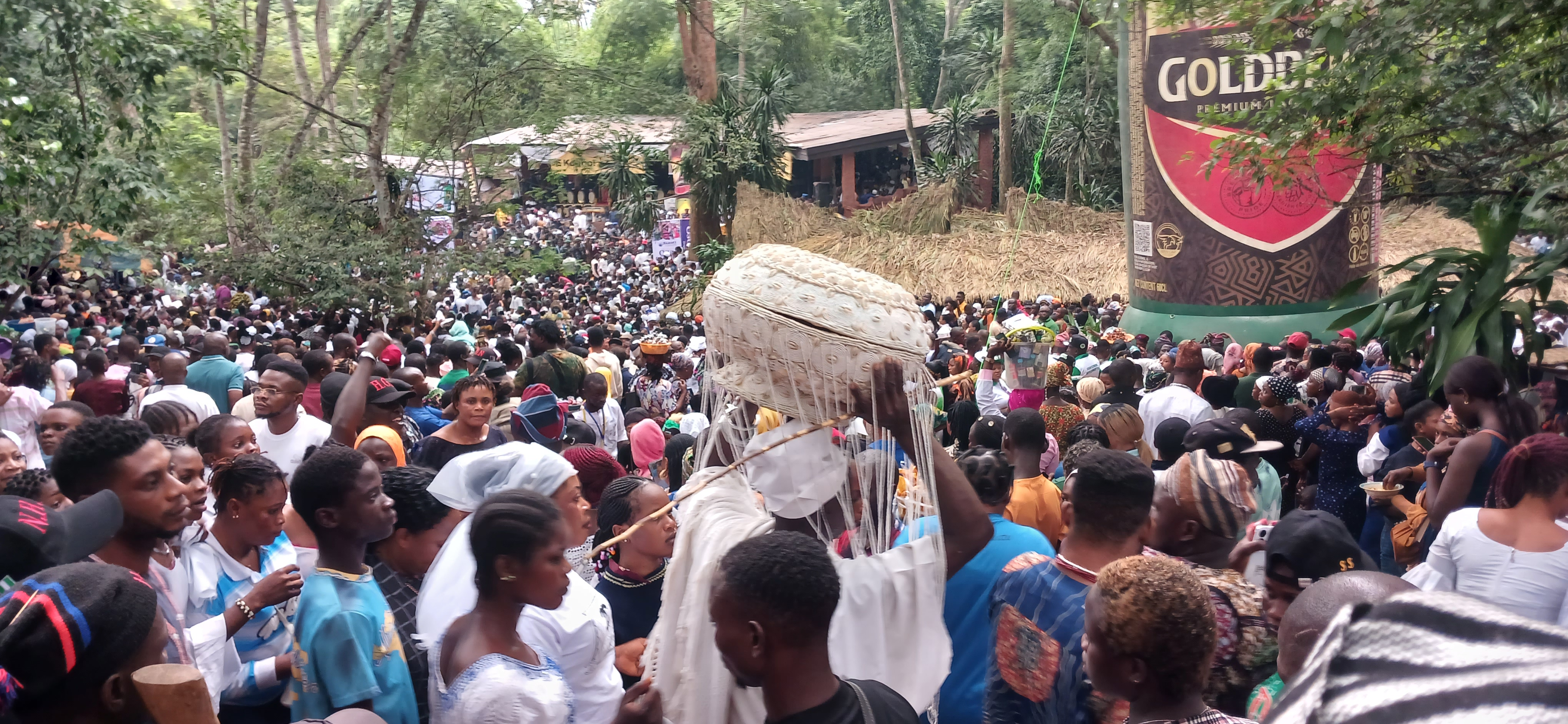
Osun-worshippers at the grove during one of the festivals

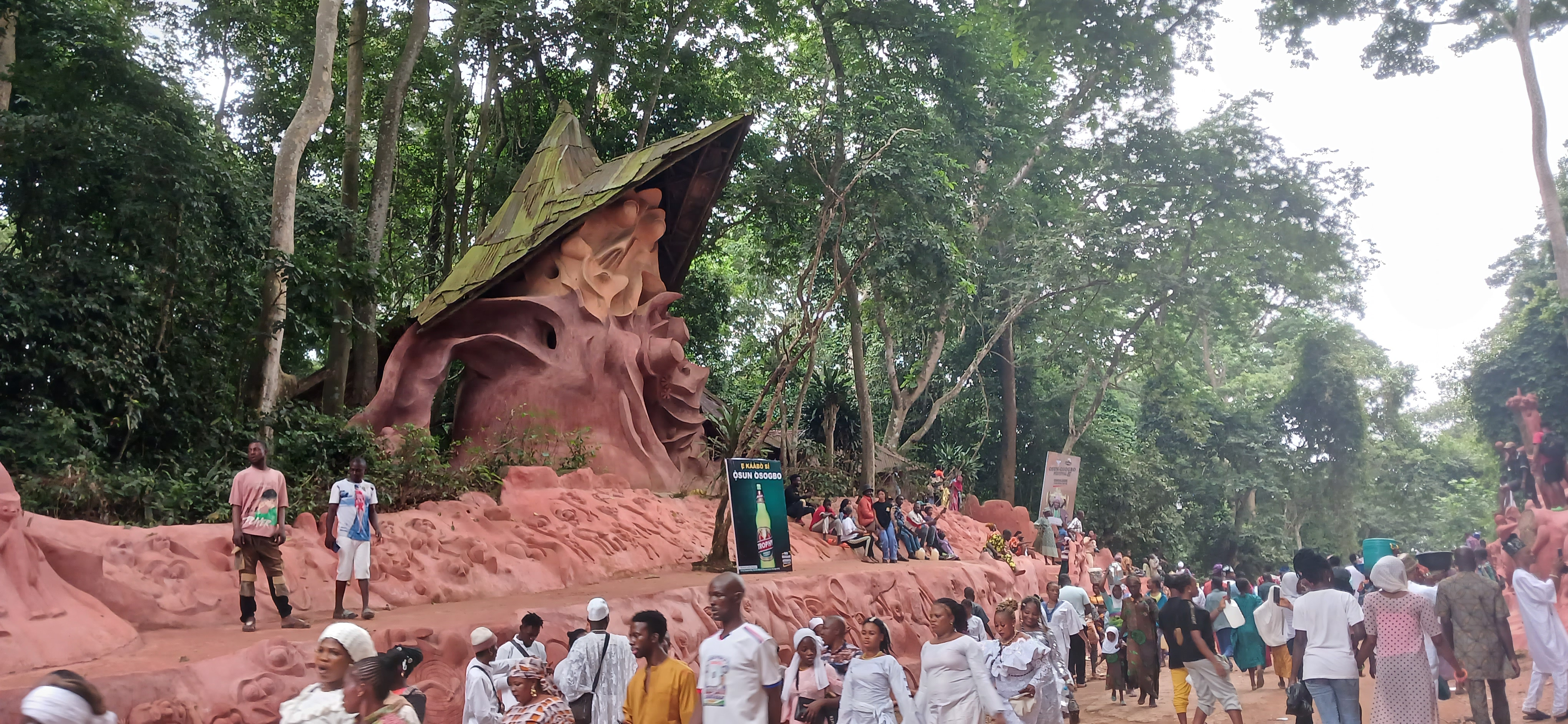
Tourists and worshippers scamper around the Osun grove

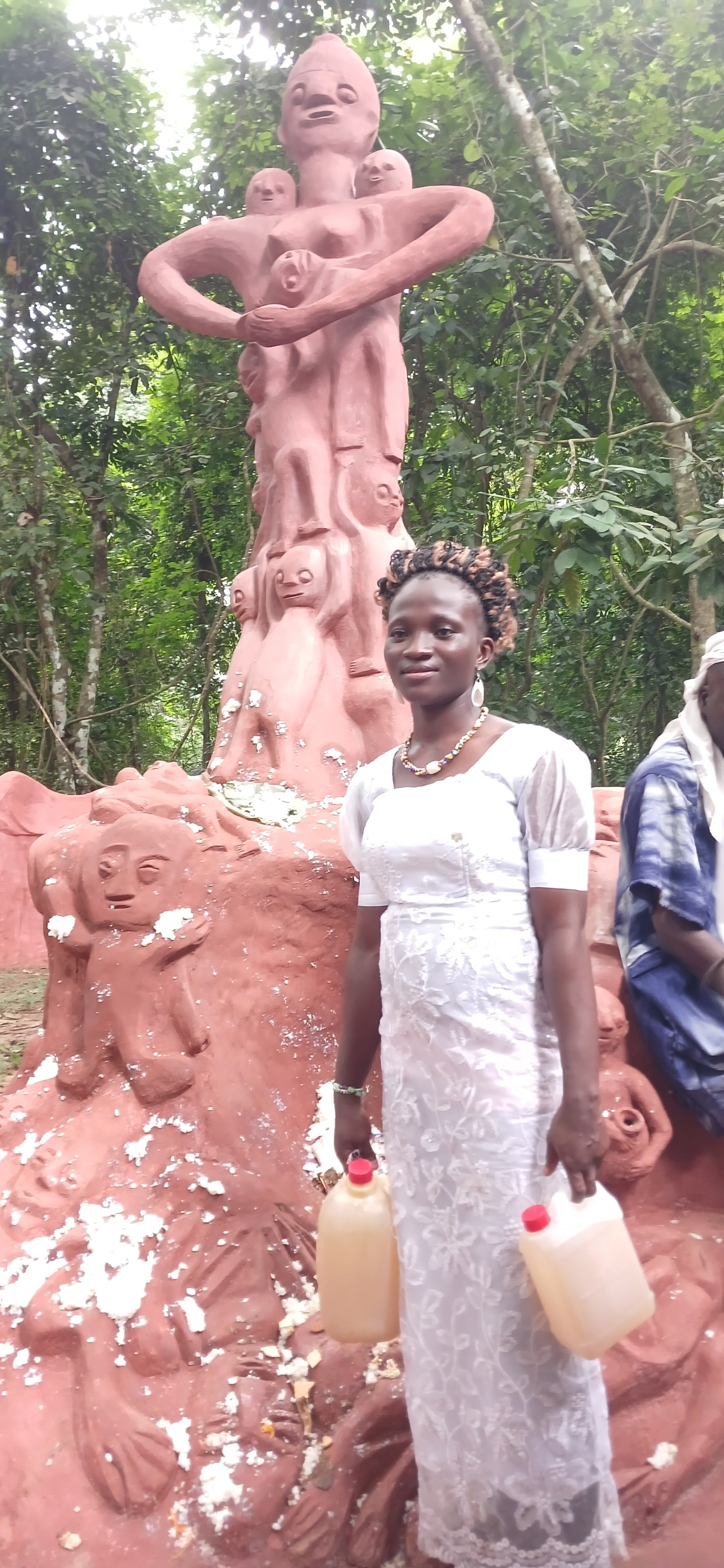
A devoted Osun worshipper with gallons of water fetched at the Osun River, perceived for the spiritual objective.

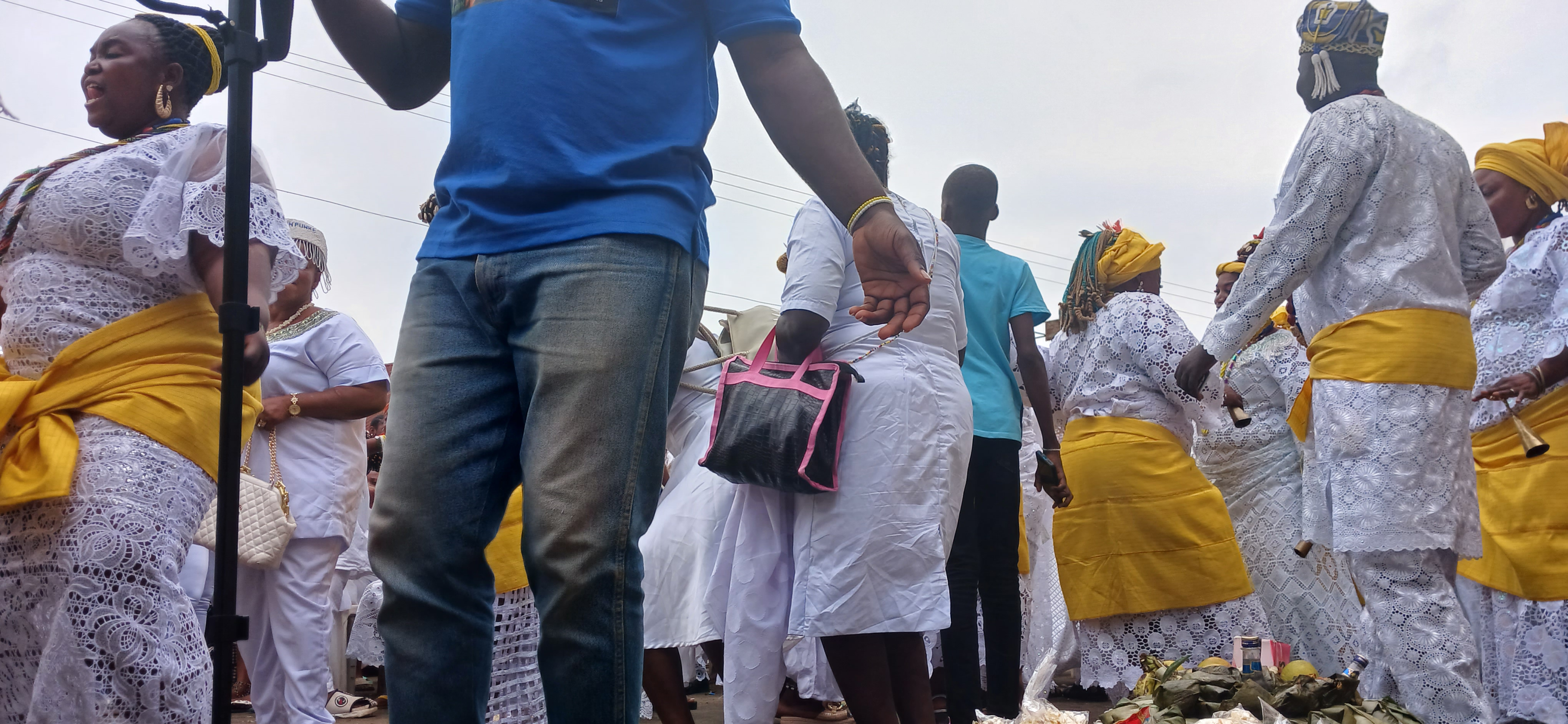
Carnival-like festival with worshippers in glamorous attires and sacrifices.

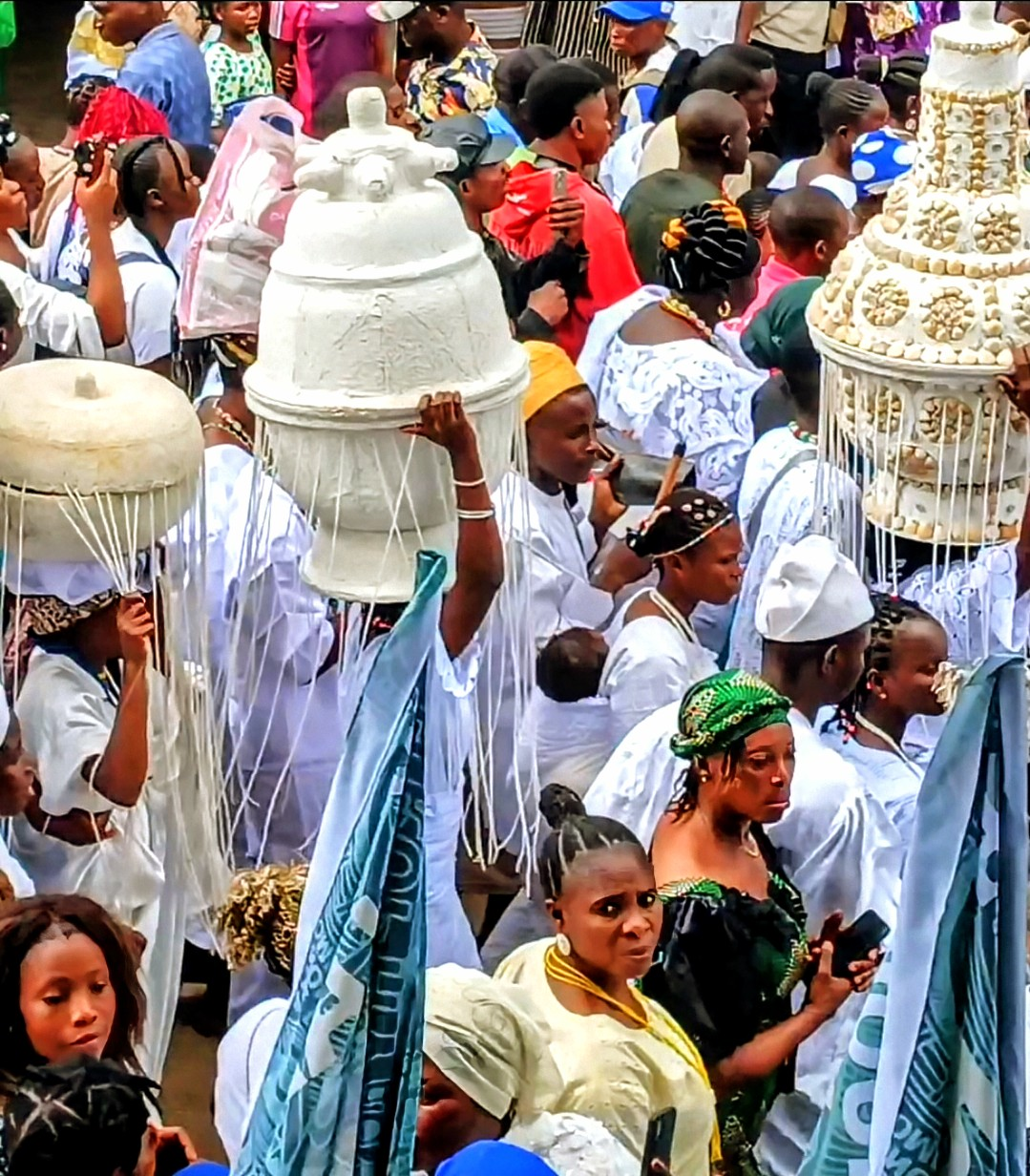
A Ceremonial Calabash symbolizing "Wealth, abundant and Blessings

A sacred symbol of prosperity carried during Osun Osogbo Festival

=== Artworks ===
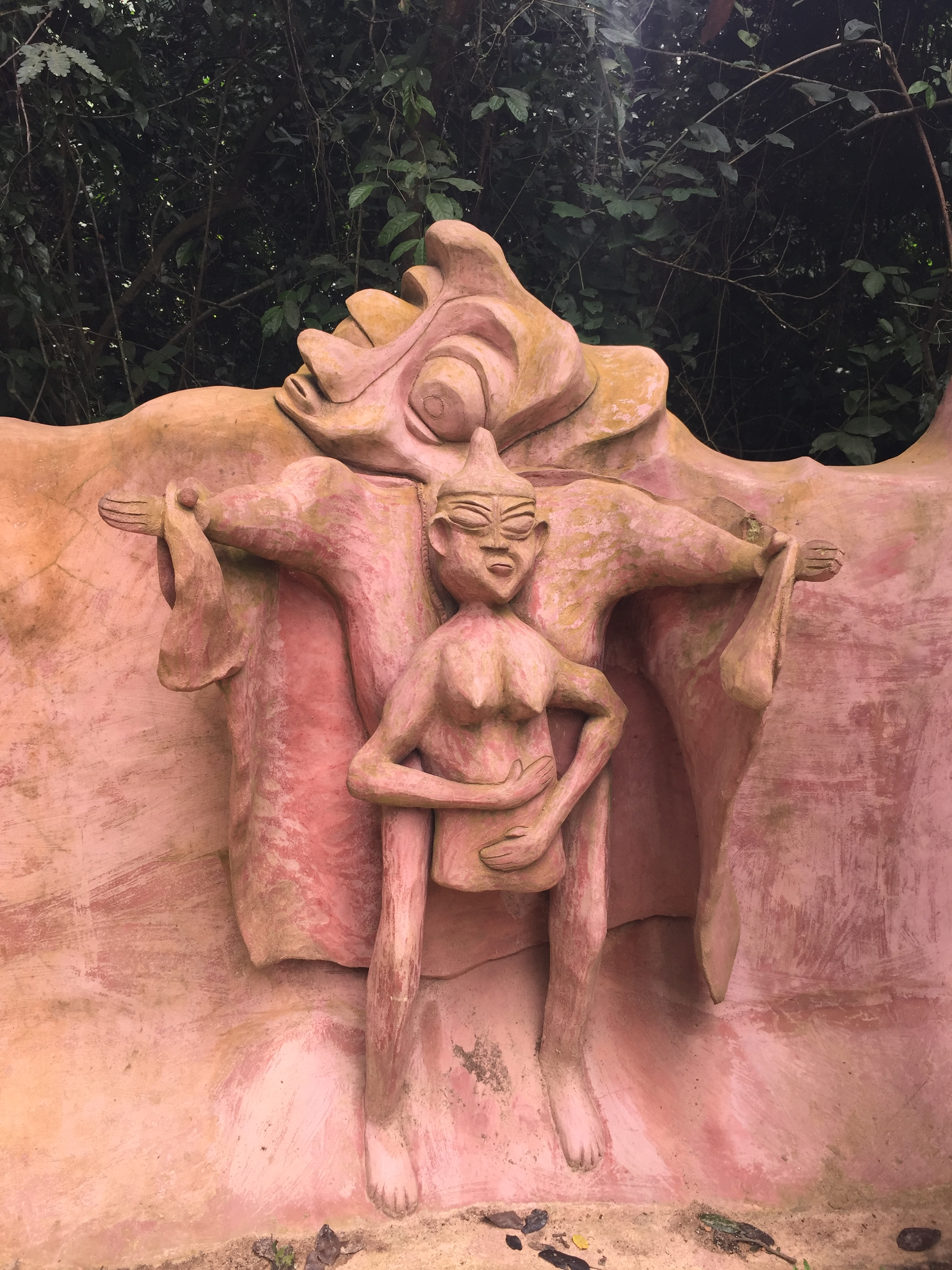
A Statue of a mystical being
