= Oshun =

Yoruba orisha

- Beauty; Water; Purity; Fertility; Love; Sensuality; Prosperity; Femininity
- Member of the Orisha
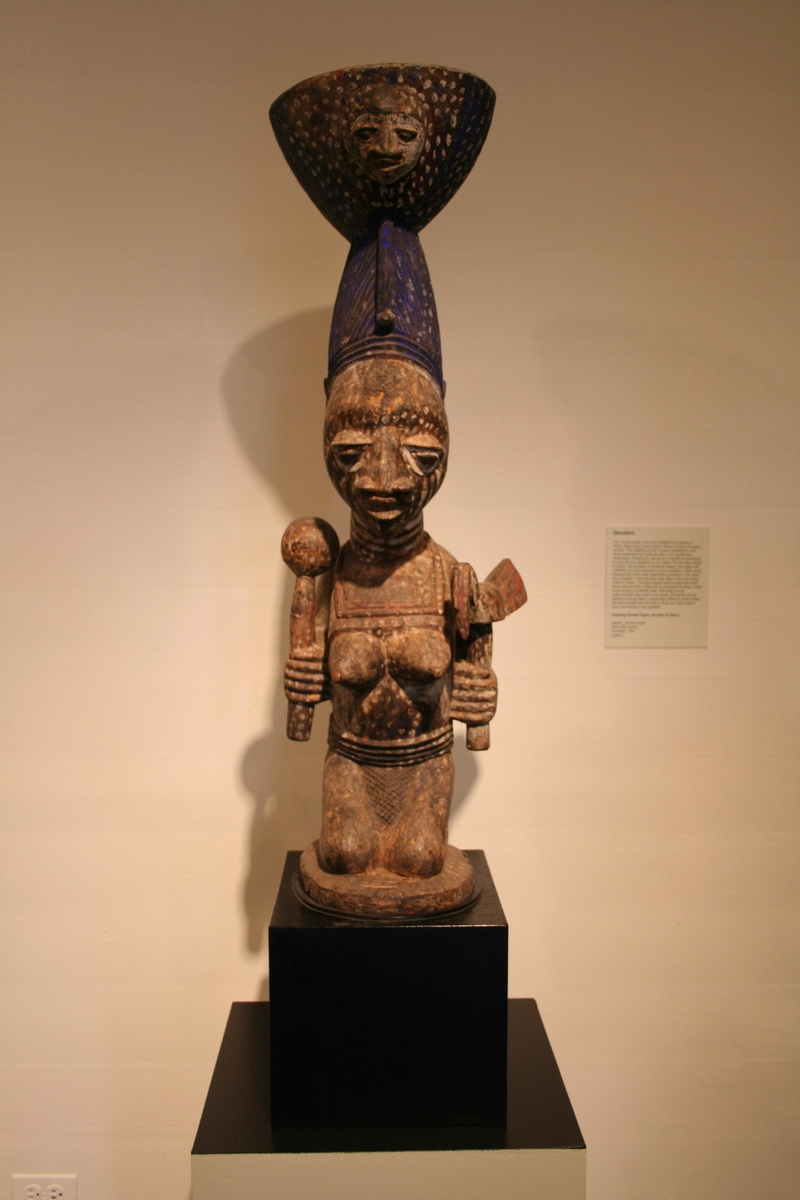
- Other names: Ọ̀ṣun, Ochún, Oxúm
- Venerated in: Yoruba religion, Dahomey religion, Vodun, Santería, Candomblé, Haitian Vodou, Dominican Vudú
- Animals: Vulture, peacock
- Symbols: Abẹ̀bẹ̀, gold, bronze, amber, pumpkin, honey, mead, wine, confections, orange
- Day: The second day of the Kọjọda week
- Color: Yellow, coral, gold, white
- Number: Five
- Region: Nigeria, Benin, Latin America, Haiti, Cuba
- Ethnic group: Yoruba people, Fon people
- Festivals: Ọṣun-Osogbo Festival

Genealogy
- Spouse: Shango, Oshosi, Ogun
- Children: Ibeji

Equivalents
- Canaanite: Astarte
- Greek: Aphrodite
- Norse: Freyja, Frigg
- Roman: Venus
- Hittite: Sauska

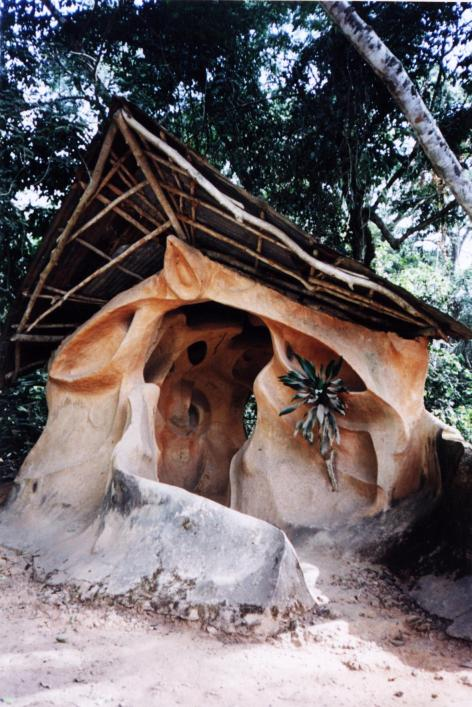
Shrine to Oshun in the Osun-Osogbo Sacred Grove

Oshun (also Ọṣun, Ochún, and Oxúm) is the orisha associated with love, sexuality, fertility, femininity, water, destiny, divination, purity, wealth, prosperity and beauty, and the Osun River, in the Yoruba religion. She is considered one of the most popular and venerated of the 401 orishas.

According to traditional beliefs, Oshun was once the queen consort to King Shango of Oyo, and deified following her death, honored at the Osun-Osogbo Festival, a two-week-long annual festival that usually takes place in August, at the Oṣun-Osogbo Sacred Grove in Osogbo. A violín is a type of musical ceremony in Regla de Ocha performed for Osún. It includes both European classical music and Cuban popular music.

== Mythology ==
According to the Ifa Literary Corpus, Oshun was the only female Irunmole (primordial spirit) sent to assist Shango to create the world by Olodumare, the Supreme God. The other spirits sent ignored Oshun, who went to Shango for guidance. One version of the story claims that female spirits were tempted to take matters into their own hands, but all of their creative attempts failed because they acted without male spiritual leadership.

Another version, one more consistent with the beginning of the story, claims that the male spirits attempted to make the world without female influence, and this exclusion is what caused the world to fail. Regardless of the version, the myth ends with Shango forcing the other spirits to respect Oshun as they would him. Following her death, Olodumare granted her the powers of an orisha.

== Worship ==
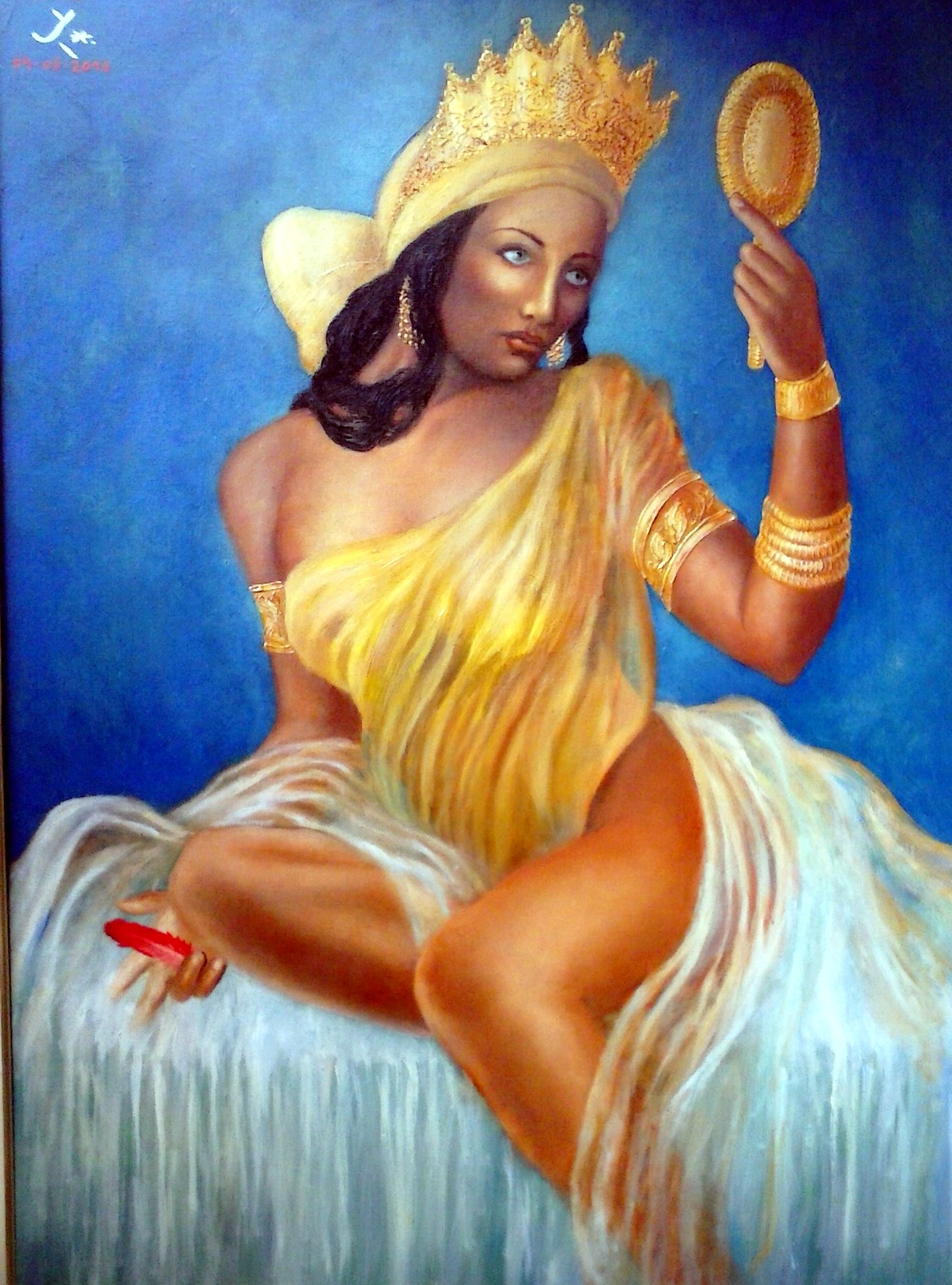
The Yoruba goddess Oshun is sometimes syncretised with the Virgin Mary by Santeria believers of the Yoruba religion.

=== Yorubaland ===
Oshun is the divine patroness of the Osun River in Nigeria, which bears her name. The river has its source in Ekiti State in the west of Nigeria and passes through the city of Osogbo, where Osun-Osogbo Sacred Grove, the principal sanctuary of the deity, is located. Oṣun is honored at the Osun-Osogbo Festival, a two-week-long annual festival that usually takes place in August, at the Oṣun-Osogbo Sacred Grove on the banks of the river.

=== Brazil ===
Ọshun was adopted into Afro-Brazilian religions, retaining her role as the goddess of love, beauty, and waters, with the addition of power over wealth and prosperity. Followers seek help for romantic problems from Oshun; the orishá is also responsible for marriage and other relationships. As the orishá of financial life, she is also called the "Lady of Gold". This referred to copper at one time for being the most valuable metal of the time. Oshun is worshiped at rivers and waterfalls, and more rarely, near mineral water sources. She is a symbol of sensitivity and is identified by weeping.

=== Candomblé ===
In Candomblé Bantu, Oshun is called Nkisi Ndandalunda, the Lady of Fertility and Moon. Hongolo and Kisimbi have similarities with Oshun, and the three are often confused.

In Candomblé Ketu, Oshun is the deity of fresh water; the patron of gestation and fecundity; and receives the prayers of women who wish to have children and protect them during pregnancy. Osun also protects small children until they begin to speak; she is affectionately called "Mamãe" ("Mama") by her devotees. Plants associated with Osun in Brazil are aromatic, sweet, and often yellow, reflecting the qualities of the Orisha. They include mints (Lamiacaea). Osun is associated with the folha-de-dez-réis (Hydrocotyle cybelleta), a plant of the pennywort family. Many species are brilliant yellow, reflecting Osun's association with gold and wealth. She is also associated with folha-da-fortuna, or Kalanchoe pinnata.

== Ozun ==
Ozun is another major Orisha that is distinct from Oṣun, the latter who is also called "Oshun" and "Ochún" in the Santería religion of the Caribbean (Cuba, Puerto Rico and Trinidad) brought over by Yoruba people during the transatlantic slave trade. While Ozun is a masculine Orisha associated with John the Baptist, Ochún is syncretized with Our Lady of Charity.

== Gallery ==
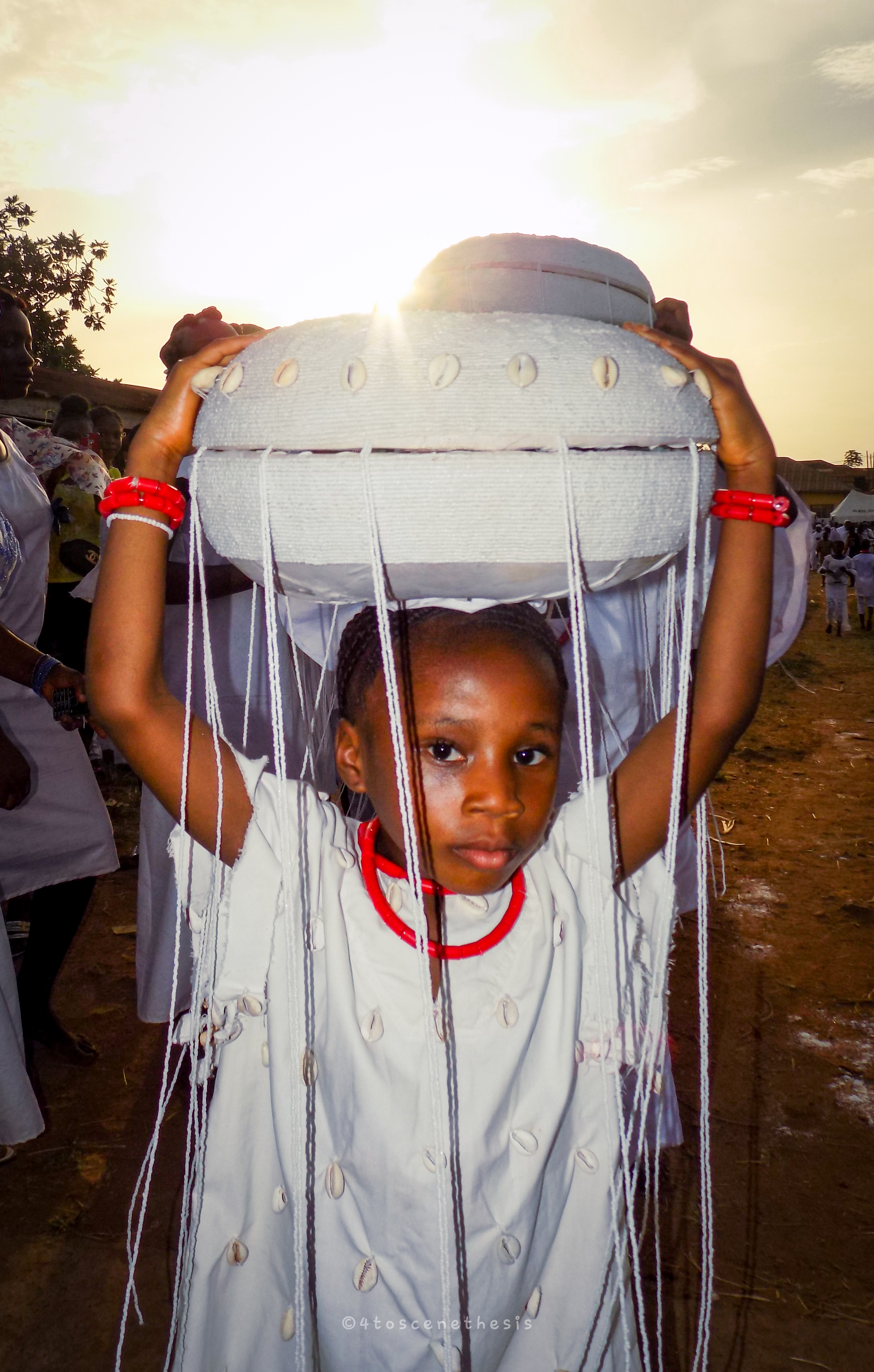
An Arugba at the Osun-Osogbo festival

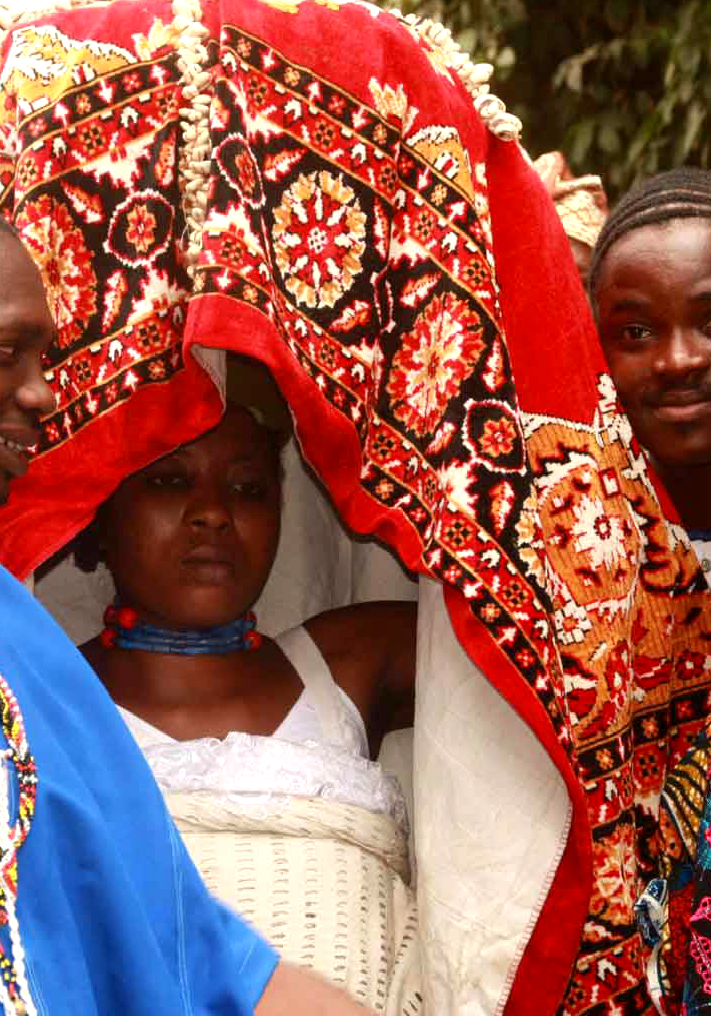
An Arugba at the Osun-Osogbo festival

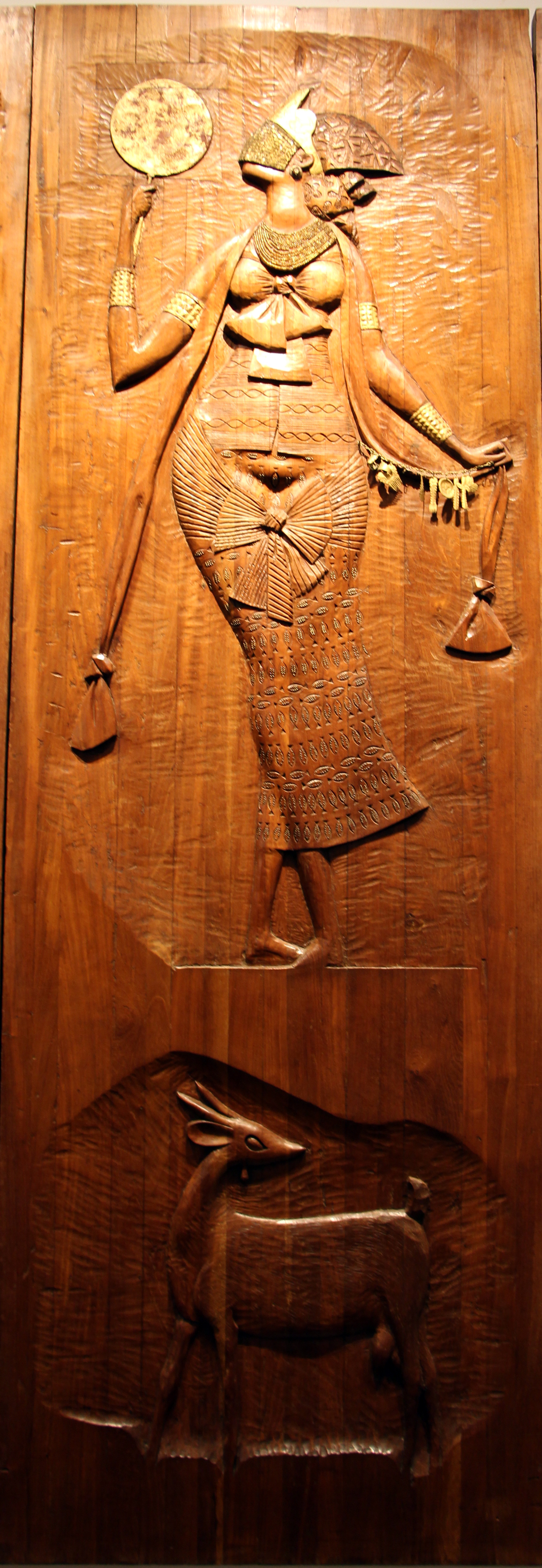
A wood carving of Oshun by Carybé

== See also ==
- Abebe (handfan)
- Yemoja
- Oya
- Oba
