= Asejire Reservoir =

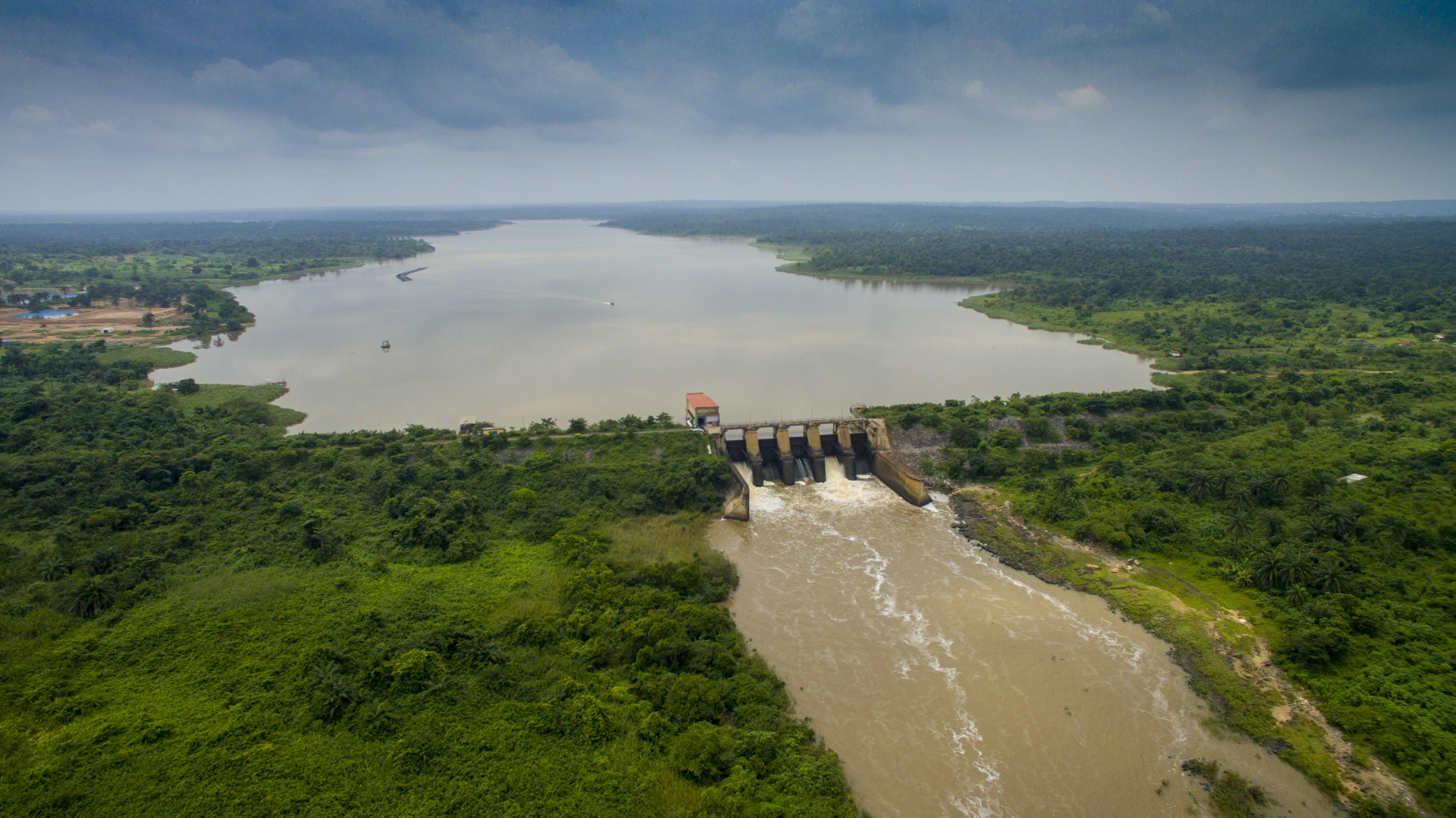
- The Asejire Reservoir is in Oyo State in the south west of Nigeria on the Osun River, about 30 kilometers east of Ibadan.
- Interactive map of Asejire Reservoir
- Location: Oyo State, Nigeria
- Coordinates: 7°21′45″N 4°08′00″E

Dam and spillways
- Impounds: Osun River

Reservoir
- Creates: Asejire Reservoir

The Asejire Reservoir is a reservoir in Nigeria, located on the border between Oyo State and Osun State, about 30 kilometers east of the city of Ibadan. The reservoir is created by the impoundment of the Osun River by the Asejire Dam. The reservoir was built in the late 1960s. Farming is totally banned in the catchment area, and trees have been planted on the banks, making erosion and silting non-issues. With plentiful water supply, the reservoir remains full throughout the year. The reservoir provides raw water to the Asejire and Osegere water treatment plants in Ibadan. The water supply project was completed in 1972, and has a capacity of about 80 million liters per day, of which 80% is used for domestic purposes.

== Rehabilitation ==
Oyo state government in 2023, partner with an international company to rehabilitate the dam.
