= Ōba =

Ōba, Oba, Ooba or Ohba (written: 大場, 大庭 or 大葉) is a Japanese surname. Notable people with the surname include:

- Akira Oba (大場 啓; born 1976), Japanese footballer
- Emiko Ohba (大場 恵美子), Japanese table tennis player
- Hideo Ohba (大庭 英雄; 1910–1986), Japanese aikidoka and judoka
- Ōba Kagechika (大庭 景親; died 1180), Japanese samurai
- Kenji Oba (大場 健史; born 1967), Japanese footballer
- Kenji Ohba (大葉 健二; 1955–2026), Japanese actor and stuntman
- Mahito Ōba (大場 真人; born 1961), Japanese voice actor and narrator
- Masao Ohba (大場 政夫; 1949–1973), Japanese boxer
- Mina Ōba (大場 美奈; born 1992), Japanese singer and actress
- Minako Oba (大庭 みな子; 1930–2007), Japanese writer and social critic
- Miyabi Oba (大庭 雅; born 1995), Japanese figure skater
- Noriyoshi Ohba (大場 規勝), Japanese video game designer
- Onario Oba (died 2009), Belizean shooting victim
- Saichi Oba (大場 佐一), Japanese submarine commander
- Sakae Ōba (大場 栄; 1914–1992), Imperial Japanese Army officer
- Seiichi Oba (大場 清悦; born 1973), Japanese basketball player and executive
- Shōgyo Ōba (大場 松魚; 1916–2012), Japanese maki-e lacquer artist
- Shota Oba (大場 翔太; born 1985), Japanese baseball player
- Tsugumi Ohba (大場 つぐみ), Japanese manga artist
