= Turley, Oklahoma =

- CDP
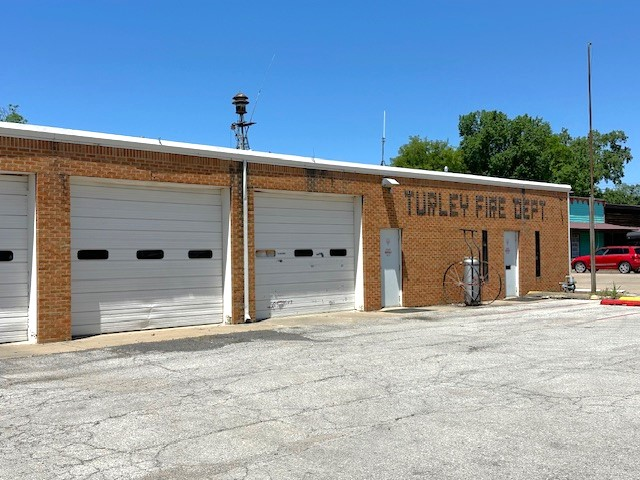
- Turley Fire Department in May of 2025

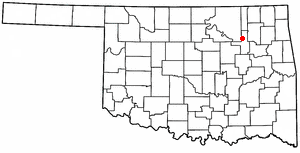
- Location of Turley, Oklahoma
- Coordinates: 36°14′51″N 95°58′13″W
- Country: United States
- State: Oklahoma
- County: Tulsa

Area
  - Total: 3.63 sq mi (9.40 km^{2})
  - Land: 3.63 sq mi (9.39 km^{2})
  - Water: 0.0039 sq mi (0.01 km^{2})
- Elevation: 636 ft (194 m)

Population (2020)
  - Total: 2,607
  - Density: 719.0/sq mi (277.62/km^{2})
- Time zone: UTC-6 (Central (CST))
  - Summer (DST): UTC-5 (CDT)
- ZIP code: 74126
- Area codes: 539/918
- FIPS code: 40-75150
- GNIS feature ID: 1099063

Turley is a census-designated place (CDP) in Tulsa County, Oklahoma, United States. The population was 2,607 at the time of the 2020 census.

== History ==
Turley was historically known as Flat Rock. The community was established around 1897, and the first school was established there in 1902. The post office was located in Jim Turley's and S.L. Daun's store. The store and the blacksmith shop comprised the first town of Turley, which was located northeast of 66th Street North and Peoria Avenue.

== Geography ==
Turley is located at 36°14′51″N 95°58′13″W (36.247627, -95.970378).

According to the United States Census Bureau, the CDP has a total area of 3.7 square miles (9.6 km^{2}), all land.

== Demographics ==
Historical population
Census	Pop.	Note	%±
2000	3,231		—
2010	2,756		−14.7%
2020	2,607		−5.4%
U.S. Decennial Census

=== 2020 census ===
As of the 2020 census, Turley had a population of 2,607. The median age was 43.4 years. 21.1% of residents were under the age of 18 and 18.3% of residents were 65 years of age or older. For every 100 females there were 105.9 males, and for every 100 females age 18 and over there were 109.2 males age 18 and over.

93.6% of residents lived in urban areas, while 6.4% lived in rural areas.

There were 1,028 households in Turley, of which 29.5% had children under the age of 18 living in them. Of all households, 37.7% were married-couple households, 29.3% were households with a male householder and no spouse or partner present, and 22.6% were households with a female householder and no spouse or partner present. About 28.4% of all households were made up of individuals and 13.0% had someone living alone who was 65 years of age or older.

There were 1,208 housing units, of which 14.9% were vacant. The homeowner vacancy rate was 0.4% and the rental vacancy rate was 18.7%.

Racial composition as of the 2020 census
Race	Number	Percent
White	1,325	50.8%
Black or African American	368	14.1%
American Indian and Alaska Native	170	6.5%
Asian	54	2.1%
Native Hawaiian and Other Pacific Islander	2	0.1%
Some other race	258	9.9%
Two or more races	430	16.5%
Hispanic or Latino (of any race)	496	19.0%

=== 2000 census ===
As of the census of 2000, there were 3,231 people, 1,253 households, and 859 families residing in the CDP. The population density was 873.0 inhabitants per square mile (337.1/km^{2}). There were 1,449 housing units at an average density of 391.5 per square mile (151.2/km^{2}). The racial makeup of the CDP was 66.95% White, 14.39% African American, 11.05% Native American, 0.37% Asian, 0.03% Pacific Islander, 0.84% from other races, and 6.38% from two or more races. Hispanic or Latino of any race were 3.81% of the population.

There were 1,253 households, out of which 29.4% had children under the age of 18 living with them, 48.4% were married couples living together, 13.6% had a female householder with no husband present, and 31.4% were non-families. 25.5% of all households were made up of individuals, and 9.8% had someone living alone who was 65 years of age or older. The average household size was 2.58 and the average family size was 3.10.

In the CDP, the population was spread out, with 26.3% under the age of 18, 8.7% from 18 to 24, 28.3% from 25 to 44, 23.1% from 45 to 64, and 13.6% who were 65 years of age or older. The median age was 36 years. For every 100 females, there were 97.9 males. For every 100 females age 18 and over, there were 96.7 males.

The median income for a household in the CDP was $28,779, and the median income for a family was $31,573. Males had a median income of $27,484 versus $22,400 for females. The per capita income for the CDP was $16,325. About 11.1% of families and 11.7% of the population were below the poverty line, including 11.1% of those under age 18 and 10.3% of those age 65 or over.
