= Office Business Applications =

Marketing term for software applications that use the Microsoft Office system

Office Business Applications (OBA) is a term for software applications that use the Microsoft Office system (such as Outlook, Word, or Excel) as the user interface for an application.

== Background ==
Applications and documents can be extended to add enterprise-specific features, and different line of business (LOB) systems can be integrated with Microsoft Office to make the LOB system more accessible.

OBAs employ a composite application architecture and link the 2007 Microsoft Office System applications running on the desktop to custom and off-the-shelf Line of Business (LOB) applications running on remote servers.

== Development ==
OBAs can be developed to meet a multitude of customer needs. For example, a company may want to:

- Extend its LOB application to more users.
- Implement an application that consolidates multiple user interfaces into a 2007 Office system document or SharePoint Server Web page.
- Build a workflow application that helps users to regain control of critical documents.

Companies can buy OBAs from their application vendors, or they can build their OBAs. ISVs and integrators can build applications consistent with the OBA paradigm, and leverage the existing IT investments of their customers to deliver more end-user productivity.

Microsoft developed an OBA application, in cooperation with SAP, that is called Duet.

== See also ==
- Composite application
- Service-oriented architecture
- Web 2.0
