= Akira Oba =

Japanese footballer

Personal information
- Full name: Akira Oba
- Date of birth: April 22, 1976 (age 50)
- Place of birth: Fukuoka, Japan
- Height: 1.76 m (5 ft 9 1/2 in)
- Position: Midfielder

Senior career*
Years	Team	Apps	(Gls)
1996–2006	Tokushima Vortis	262	(42)
Total		262	(42)
- * Club domestic league appearances and goals

Akira Oba (大場 啓, Ōba Akira; born April 22, 1976) is a former Japanese football player. He played for Tokushima Vortis from 2005 until 2006.

== Club statistics ==
Club performance			League		Cup		Total	
Season	Club	League	Apps	Goals	Apps	Goals	Apps	Goals
Japan			League		Emperor's Cup		Total	
1996	Otsuka Pharmaceutical	Football League	17	4			17	4
1997	Otsuka Pharmaceutical	Football League	19	0			19	0
1998	Otsuka Pharmaceutical	Football League	20	2			20	2
1999	Otsuka Pharmaceutical	Football League	19	2			19	2
2000	Otsuka Pharmaceutical	Football League	20	9			20	9
2001	Otsuka Pharmaceutical	Football League	24	5			24	5
2002	Otsuka Pharmaceutical	Football League	17	2			17	2
2003	Otsuka Pharmaceutical	Football League	29	5			29	5
2004	Otsuka Pharmaceutical	Football League	29	4	1	0	30	4
2005	Tokushima Vortis	J2 League	33	6	1	0	34	6
2006	Tokushima Vortis	J2 League	35	3	1	0	36	3
Total	Japan		262	42	3	0	265	42
Career total			262	42	3	0	265	42
