= Osun River =

River of Nigeria

Oṣun River Odò Ọ̀ṣun
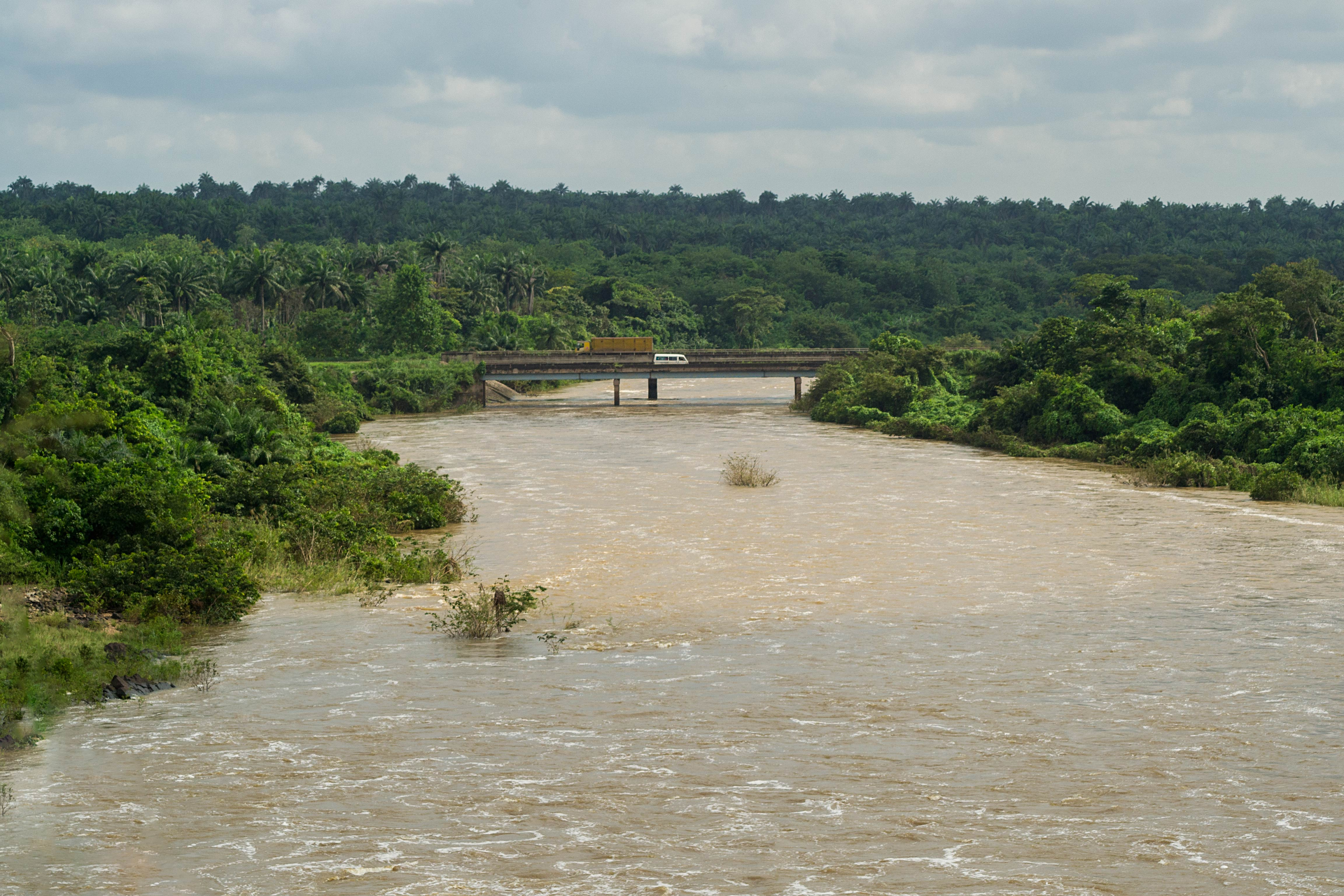
- A road crossing over the Osun river between Oyo and Osun states.

- Location within Nigeria

Location
- Country: Nigeria
- Region: Osun State

Physical characteristics
- Source
  - location: Ekiti Hills, near Igede Ekiti
  - coordinates: 8°20′N 5°16′E
- Mouth
  - location: Lekki Lagoon
  - coordinates: 6.563210°N 4.062032°E

Basin features
- Tributaries
  - left: Erinle River, Oba River

The Oṣun River (sometimes spelt Oshun, Yoruba: Odò Ọ̀ṣun), is a river of Yorubaland that rises in Ekiti State and flows westwards into Osun State before turning southwestwards at its confluence with the Erinle River near the town of Ede and then heading south at the Asejire reservoir flowing though the rest of the state and Ogun State in Southwestern Nigeria before eventually discharging into the Lekki Lagoon and the Atlantic at the Gulf of Guinea.

The river is named after the deity Oṣun, one of the most popular and venerated Orishas. The annual traditional worship at the Ọṣun Shrine near the Ọṣun River at Osogbo has become a popular pilgrimage and important tourist attraction, drawing people from all over Nigeria and abroad to the annual festival in August.

Oṣun is one of the river goddesses in Yorubaland, she is noted for providing for the needs of the people. As a mortal, she was reputedly one of the wives of ̣Ṣango, the Alaafin of Oyo and the Yoruba god of thunder. Osun is said to have been a native of Igede-Ekiti, headquarters of Irepodun/Ifelodun local government area, Ekiti state, Nigeria hence her main source is situated at Igede-Ekiti. Osun, third child of the marriage between Ake (a hunter and prince from Ile-Ife) and Erindo (Ake's wife) that would also gave birth to fifteen more children including the popular Rivers Ogbese and Elemi. While Ogbese was the brand legend of the old Afrikola, Elemi river continues to adorn the beauty of our land. Osun, the second wife of Alaafin Ṣango, turned to a river after she lost in the contest of who succeeds their father, Ake. (Note: Across multiple versions of the story, there are different reasons why Oṣun turned into a river.) In the olden days during war times, incantation was considered the most potent form of weapon. Hence, the smartest and the very vast one carries the day. "Igede" was a derivative of "Ogede"- meaning incantation and finally became "Igede" by nominalisation. So, "Ilè Ògèdè or Igede means the land of incantation. Igede-Ekiti is home to more than sixteen rivers, and it hasn't been proven otherwise by anyone or any documents that no river flows into Igede-Ekiti from anywhere. Instead, rivers flow from Igede-Ekiti to other towns and places. It is an old belief that the river goddess has been able to give babies to the barren women and change the lives of many people. There have also been many fictional stories about goddess Oṣun, including Shegun Coker and the Cursed Temple by Kolawole Michael, 2008.

In 2018, the river suddenly began to change color and investigation by Urban Alert (a civic-tech nonprofit organization) revealed that illegal and unregulated licensed gold mining activities at the headwaters upper course is the root cause. The activities of these miners have contaminated the river with heavy metals, thereby threatening the river and the Osun Osogbo Sacred Grove.

== Osun-Osogbo Sacred Grove ==
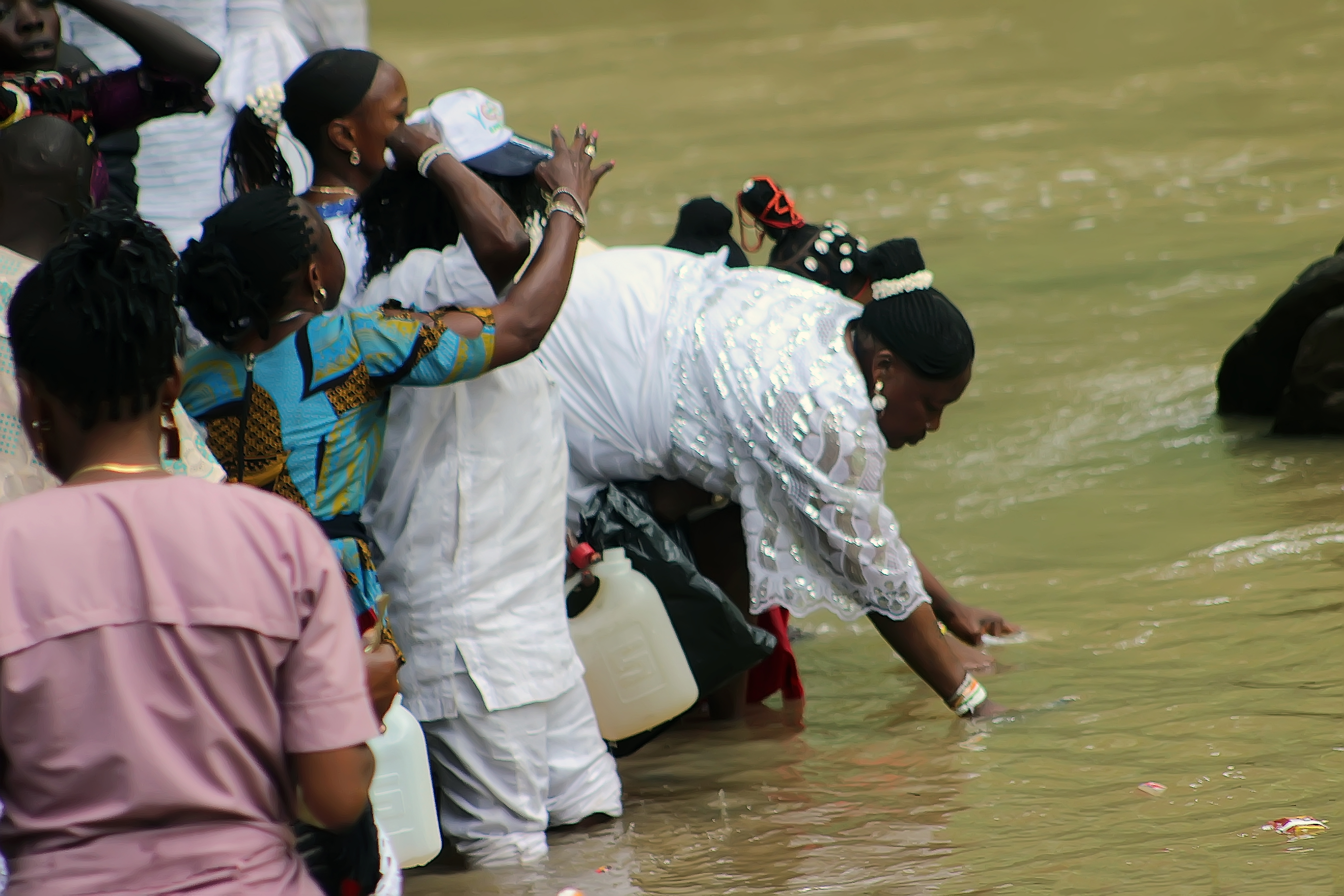
Water Worshipers at the Osun Groove

The dense forest of the Osun Sacred Grove, on the outskirts of the city of Osogbo, is one of the last remnants of primary high forest in southern Nigeria. Regarded as the abode of the goddess of fertility Osun, one of the pantheon of Yoruba gods, the landscape of the grove and its meandering river is dotted with sanctuaries and shrines, sculptures and art works in honour of Osun and other deities. The sacred grove, which is now seen as a symbol of identity for all Yoruba people, is probably the last in Yoruba culture. It testifies to the once widespread practice of establishing sacred groves outside all settlements.

=== Brief synthesis ===
A century ago there were many sacred groves in Yorubaland: every town had one. Most of these groves have now been abandoned or have shrunk to quite small areas. Osun-Osogbo, in the heart of Osogbo, the capital of Osun State, founded some 400 years ago in southwest Nigeria, at a distance of 250 km from Lagos is the largest sacred grove to have survived and one that is still revered.

The dense forest of the Osun Sacred Grove is some of the last remnants of primary high forest in southern Nigeria. Through the forest meanders the river Osun, the spiritual abode of the river goddess Osun. Set within the forest sanctuary are forty shrines, sculptures and art works erected in honour of Osun and other Yoruba deities, many created in the past forty years, two palaces, five sacred places and nine worship points strung along the river banks with designated priests and priestesses.

The new art installed in the grove has also differentiated it from other groves: Osogbo is now unique in having a large component of 20th century sculpture created to reinforce the links between people and the Yoruba pantheon, and the way in which Yoruba towns linked their establishment and growth to the spirits of the forest.

The restoration of the grove by artists has given the grove a new importance: it has become a sacred place for the whole of Yorubaland and a symbol of identity for the wider Yoruba Diaspora.

The Grove is an active religious site where daily, weekly and monthly worship takes place. In addition, an annual processional festival to re-establish the mystic bonds between the goddess and the people of the town occurs every year over twelve days in July and August and thus sustains the living cultural traditions of the Yoruba people.

The Grove is also a natural herbal pharmacy containing over 400 species of plants, some endemic, of which more than 200 species are known for their medicinal uses.

Criterion (ii): The development of the Movement of New Sacred Artists and the absorption of Suzanne Wenger, an Austrian artist, into the Yoruba community have proved to be a fertile exchange of ideas that revived the sacred Osun Grove.

Criterion (iii): The Osun Sacred Grove is the largest and perhaps the only remaining example of a once widespread phenomenon that used to characterize every Yoruba settlement. It now represents Yoruba sacred Groves and their reflection of Yoruba cosmology.

Criterion (vi): The Osun Grove is a tangible expression of Yoruba divinatory and cosmological systems; its annual festival is a living thriving and evolving response to Yoruba beliefs in the bond between people, their ruler and the Osun goddess.

=== Integrity ===
The property encompasses almost the whole of the sacred grove and certainly all that has been restored over the forty years before inscription. Some of the recent sculptures are vulnerable to lack of regular maintenance which given their materials – cement, iron and mud – could lead to potentially difficult and expensive conservation problems.

The Grove is also vulnerable to over-visiting and visitor pressure that could erode the equilibrium between the natural aspects and people necessary to sustain the spiritual qualities of the site.

=== Authenticity ===
The authenticity of the Grove is related to its value as a sacred place. The sacred nature of places can only be continually reinforced if that sacredness is widely respected. Over the past forty years the new sculptures in the Grove have had the effect of reinforcing the special qualities of the Grove and giving it back its spiritual qualities that imbue it with high cultural value.

At the same time the new sculptures are part of a long and continuing tradition of sculptures created to reflect Yoruba cosmology. Although their form reflects a new stylistic departure, the works were not created to glorify the artists but rather through their giant size and intimidating shapes to re-establish the sacredness of the Grove. The new sculptures have achieved their purpose and the Grove now has wider than local significance as a sacred place for the Yoruba people.

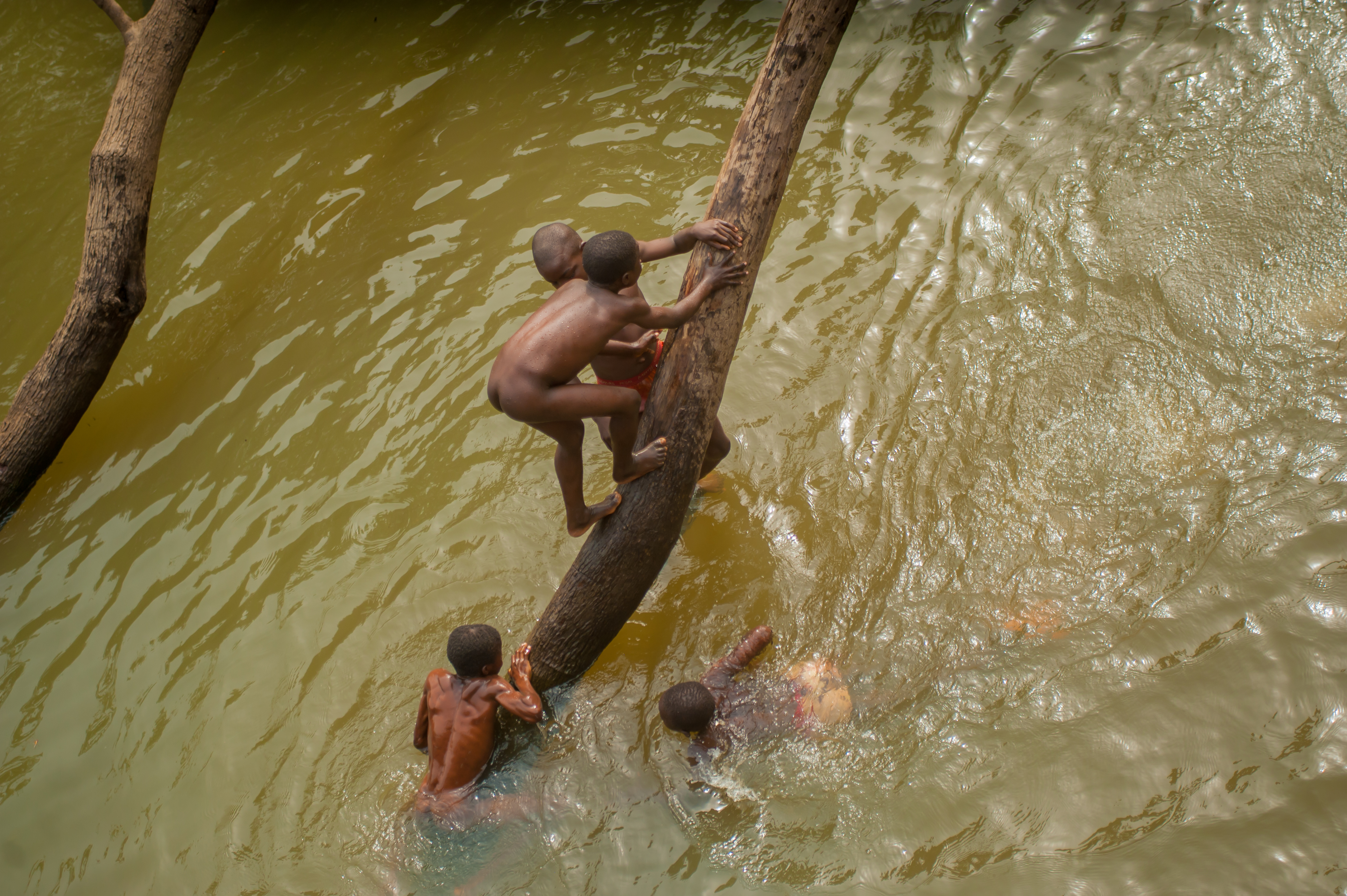
Kids in the river at Osun, Nigeria

=== Protection and management requirements ===
The Grove was first declared a National Monument in 1965. This original designation was amended and expanded in 1992 to protect the entire 75 hectares. The Nigerian Cultural Policy of 1988 states that ‘The State shall preserve as Monuments old city walls and gates, sites, palaces, shrines, public buildings, promote buildings of historical significance and monumental sculptures’. Under the Land Use Act of 1990 the Federal Government of Nigeria conferred trusteeship of the Grove to the Government of Osun State.

The Grove had a well-developed management plan covering the period 2004–2009 that was adopted by all stakeholders and the site enjoys a participatory management system. The Federal Government administers the site through a site manager of the National Commission for Museums and Monument as empowered by Decree 77 of 1979. Osun State Government equally contributes to its protection and management through its respective Local Governments, Ministries and Parastatals, who are also empowered by the state edicts to manage state monuments.

The community’s traditional responsibilities and cultural rites are exercised through the Ataoja (King) and his council - the Osogbo Cultural Heritage Council. There are traditional activities that have been used to protect the site from any form of threats such as traditional laws, myths, taboos and customs that forbid people from fishing, hunting, poaching, felling of trees and farming.

The traditional worshippers and devotees maintain the intangible heritage through spiritualism, worship and symbolism. There is a management committee made up of all cadres of stakeholders, that implements policies, actions and activities for the sustainable development of the site.

Osun-Osogbo Sacred Grove is also part of National Tourism development Master Plan that was established with World Tourism Organization (WTO) and United Nations Development Programme (UNDP). The annual Osun Osogbo festival will need to be better managed so that the site will no longer suffer from adverse impacts of tourism during the festival.

The Grove will also serve as a model of African heritage that preserves the tangible and intangible values of the Osogbo people in particular, and the entire Yoruba people. As a source of pride to them, the Grove will remain a living thriving heritage that has traditional landmarks and a veritable means of transfer of traditional religion, and indigenous knowledge systems, to African people in the Diaspora.

== Environmental Issues ==
=== Water Pollution ===
The river, which traverses five states in the area before emptying into the Gulf of Guinea, has recently been contaminated by nearby villages' mining operations. The river have suffered plastic pollution, heavy metals contamination as a result of illegal gold mining as well as pollution from human generated waste. Report says that Osun River is being polluted by the activities of gold miners in some parts of Osun State. Further physio-chemical and microbiological test has revealed that the Osun River is heavily contaminated with mercury, lead, cyanide, and other injurious elements.

Artisanal mining is more prevalent in Nigeria. While some artisans specialize on alluvial deposits and use light tools like shovels, others, supported by smaller businesses, utilize heavier tools like excavators. Residents of Osun identified Chinese backers who engaged armed security personnel and operated in secrecy. There are numerous mining sites spread out along the river and its tributaries. However, Osun is also the location of Nigeria's sole sizable commercial gold mine. The Osun government has advised tourists, devotees and visitors to the grand finale of the annual Osun Osogbo Festival not to drink water from the Osun River because of its contamination.

In an early 2024 study, the river recorded the highest level of microplastics ever reported in river water globally, particularly at the Aregbe location, situated at the heart of the Osogbo metropolitan area. The predominant types of microplastics found in the Osun River water and sediments are foam and fragment particles, with others including film, fiber, pellet, and bead microplastics, specifically microbeads. The high-level microplastics pollution is attributed to the regular use and indiscriminate disposal of single-use plastic materials. These include fast-food packaging items, bags for vegetables and groceries, serving plates and cups at occasions, pure water sachet packs, polythene bags, bottles for carbonated drinks and alcoholic beverages. The free discharge of domestic and bathroom wastewaters into the environment from the majority of homes in the location also contributes to the pollution, arising from personal care and cosmetic products, including facial scrubs, toothpastes, shower gels, and nail polishes, which constitute the discharged wastewaters.
