= Ọba =

Water deity in the Yoruba religion

- Domesticity; passing of time and life; homemaking; fidelity; the River Ọbà
- Member of Orisha
- Other names: Ọbá, Ọbà
- Venerated in: Yoruba religion, Umbanda, Candomble, Santeria, Haitian Vodou, Folk Catholicism
- Major cult center: Ogbomọṣọ
- Symbol: lightning, the sword or machete, the flywhisk, water buffalo
- Color: pink
- Region: Nigeria, Benin, Latin America
- Ethnic group: Yoruba

Genealogy
- Spouse: Shango

Ọbà (known as Obá in Latin America) is the orisha of the River Oba, the source of which lies near Igbon, where her worship originates. During the wars of the 19th century, her centers of worship moved to the more secure town Ogbomosho. She is traditionally identified as the senior wife of Shango (the third king of the Oyo Empire and an orisha). Oba metaphorically "gave her ear" to Shango by listening and being attentive to her husband. She represents stability and sacred bonds. She is syncretized with Saint Catherine of Siena.

== Worship in Ogbomosho ==
At her center of worship in Ogbomoso, Oba is described as the partner of Ajagun (Shango) and is praised as "Oba, who owns parrot tail feathers and fights on the left".

Oba is held a festival in Odo-Oba town in Ogbomoso.

== Myths of Oba's ear ==
Oba's humiliation by a rival co-wife is one of the most well-known tales associated with this Orisha. While William Bascom's study identified several unusual variations of it, the most popular myth found in West Africa, Brazil, and Cuba has Oba cutting off her ear to serve to her husband Shango as food, because one of her co-wives (most often Oshun) has convinced her this will secure Shango's attention. Once Shango sees the ear and realizes Oba has mutilated herself, he chases her from his house and into permanent exile. Bascom notes that though this story is known in many parts of Yoruba country, it was not recognized by her priest in Ogbomosho.

There are a few variations of the myth in Cuba where Oya rather than Oshun tricks Oba. Another Cuban variation excludes the wifely rivalry entirely, explaining Oba's self-mutilation of both ears as an effort to feed Shango after they run out of goat and he is in need of food for his struggle against Ogun. By comparison, in the verses of the Odu Ifá, Oba lends her ear at the advice of Ifá and the measure successfully ties Shango to Oba, as none of his other wives would listen to his ideas. Oya, representing the independent woman, did not need Shango' advice. Oshun, representing love and the honey of life, was busy with other men.

== Relationship to other orishas ==
=== Ifa-Orisha ===
González-Wippler, in her study of Santería, describes her as the daughter of Yemoja and one of the consorts of Shango. She is said to have given her husband her ear to eat, an event which led to her eventual flight from his presence. Grieving, she became the Oba river which intersects with the Oshun river (Oshun was another wife of Shango and is believed to have been the one who tricked her into the giving of the ear) at turbulent rapids, a symbol of the rivalry between the two wives. The Oba River flows through Iwo, that is why the Iwo people are called the children of the River Oba (Iwo Olodo Oba).

== Bibliography ==
- Bascom, William. "Ọba's Ear: A Yoruba Myth in Cuba and Brazil" in Research in African Literatures, Vol. 7, No. 2 (Autumn, 1976), pp. 149–165.
- Brown, David H. 2003. Santería Enthroned: Art, Ritual and Innovation in an Afro-Cuban Religion. Chicago: University of Chicago Press.
- González-Wippler, Migene. Santeria: The Religion. Llewellyn: 1994.
