= Oklahoma Bankers Association =

Trade association in Oklahoma, US

The Oklahoma Bankers Association (OBA) is a trade association based in Oklahoma City, representing more than 220 member banks. It has been running for over one hundred years. It assists its members with government relations, educational programs, and other products and services. Roger M. Beverage serves as the president and CEO.
