= Renato Kehl =

Brazilian physician, author and eugenicist

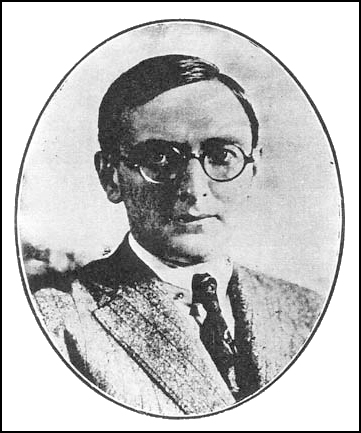
- Born: Renato Ferraz Kehl; August 22, 1889; Limeira, São Paulo, Empire of Brazil
- Died: August 14, 1978 (aged 88); São Paulo, Brazil
- Occupations: Pharmacist, physician, writer, eugenicist
- Known for: works on eugenics
- Relatives: Maria Rita Kehl (granddaughter)

Renato Ferraz Kehl (August 22, 1889 – August 14, 1978) was a Brazilian pharmacist, physician, writer and eugenicist from the early 20th century.

== Career ==
Graduated from the Rio de Janeiro School of Medicine in 1915, Renato Kehl, of Germanic origin, worked at the beginning of his career at the National Department of Public Health (DNSP), carrying out activities focused on rural sanitation and hygiene and sanitary education. From the end of the 1920s, he became a businessman in the pharmaceutical industry, standing out as Director of Bayer in Brazil. His name would become best known for his tireless dedication to eugenics, which he called "the religion of humanity". For the writer Monteiro Lobato, who attended the Eugenics Society meetings to oppose Kehl´s ideas, Kehl should be considered the "father of eugenics in Brazil", given his commitment to organizing the Brazilian eugenics movement.. Monteiro Lobato joined this scientific debate institution, as an opponent to Renato Kehl´s views, as he was then a pioneer in denouncing racism in Brazil. The correspondence between the two is dedicated to the debate of their differences (Zöhler, Beti. Monteiro Lobato e a eugenia. ZolerZoler (blog), 17 de março de 2019. Disponível em: https://zolerzoler.wordpress.com/2019/03/17/monteiro-lobato-e-a-eugenia/)

He was elected member of the Academia Nacional de Medicina in 1932, succeeding Rodolpho Albino in Chair 93, which has Belisário Penna as its patron.

== Renato Kehl and eugenics in Brazil ==
Renato Kehl's adherence to the ideas formulated by Francis Galton, the founder of the eugenics doctrine, allowed him to dedicate his career to organizing the Brazilian eugenics movement, especially between the 1910s and 1930s, a period in which racial theories and discussions about Brazilian nationality structured the way travelers, writers, intellectuals, and scientists interpreted Brazil.

In 1918, with the collaboration of a group of Brazilian doctors, he founded the Eugenics Society of São Paulo, an institution that had more than a hundred members, including Monteiro Lobato, Arnaldo Vieira de Carvalho, Afrânio Peixoto, Artur Neiva, Vital Brazil, Belisário Penna, Juliano Moreira, and other important intellectual leaders of the time. A decade later, he created the Boletim de Eugenia, a periodical that circulated between 1929 and 1933 and which became known for its dissemination of eugenic measures among Brazilians. During this same period, in addition to collaborating with the organization of the First Brazilian Congress of Eugenics, held in Rio de Janeiro in 1929, he also founded the Brazilian Central Commission of Eugenics, whose objective was to assist the Brazilian government in matters related to the eugenic improvement of the country.

Between 1910 and 1930, Renato Kehl published more than a dozen books on eugenics, notably Lições de Eugenia (1929) and Sexo e cidadania - aparas eugénias (1933), works that would be characterized by the author's greater proximity to 'negative eugenics', a radical model of eugenics that was characterized by the defense of extreme measures, such as the eugenic sterilization of "degenerates", marital and reproductive control and the racial selection of immigrants. During the 1930s, his adherence to this more radical eugenics led the Brazilian eugenicist to publicly praise the Nazi eugenics policy launched in Germany by Adolf Hitler.

His activism in favor of eugenics science, although it brought him to the forefront, making him relevant for the understanding of this movement in Brazilian social and scientific history, was not capable of producing, absolutely, a consensus in the understanding of the bases and proposals for the application of eugenics in the intellectual environment of the time.

== Bibliography ==
- BONFIM, Paulo Ricardo. Educar, Higienizar e Regenerar: Uma História da Eugenia no Brasil. Jundiaí, SP: Paco Editorial, 2017.
- CARVALHO, Leonardo Dallacqua de. A eugenia no humor da Revista Ilustrada Careta: raça e cor no Governo Provisório (1930-1934). 2014. 315 School of Sciences and Letters, São Paulo State University “Júlio de Mesquita Filho”, Assis, 2014.
- SOUZA, Vanderlei Sebastião de. A política biológica como projeto: a “eugenia negativa” e a construção da nacionalidade na trajetória de Renato Kehl (1917-1932). Fiocruz, 2006.
- Souza, V. S. Renato Kehl e a eugenia no Brasil: ciência, raça e nação no entreguerras. Eduni, 2019.
- STEPAN, Nancy. “A Eugenia no Brasil – 1917 a 1940”. In: HOCHMAN, Gilberto. & ARMUS, Diego (orgs). Cuidar, Controlar, Curar: ensaios históricos sobre saúde e doença na América Latina e Caribe. Rio de Janeiro: Ed.Fiocruz. p. 331-391, 2004.

== See also ==
- Eugenics
- Racism in Brazil
- Racial politics in Brazil
