= Ham's Redemption =

Painting by Modesto Broco

- A Redenção de Cam (Portuguese)
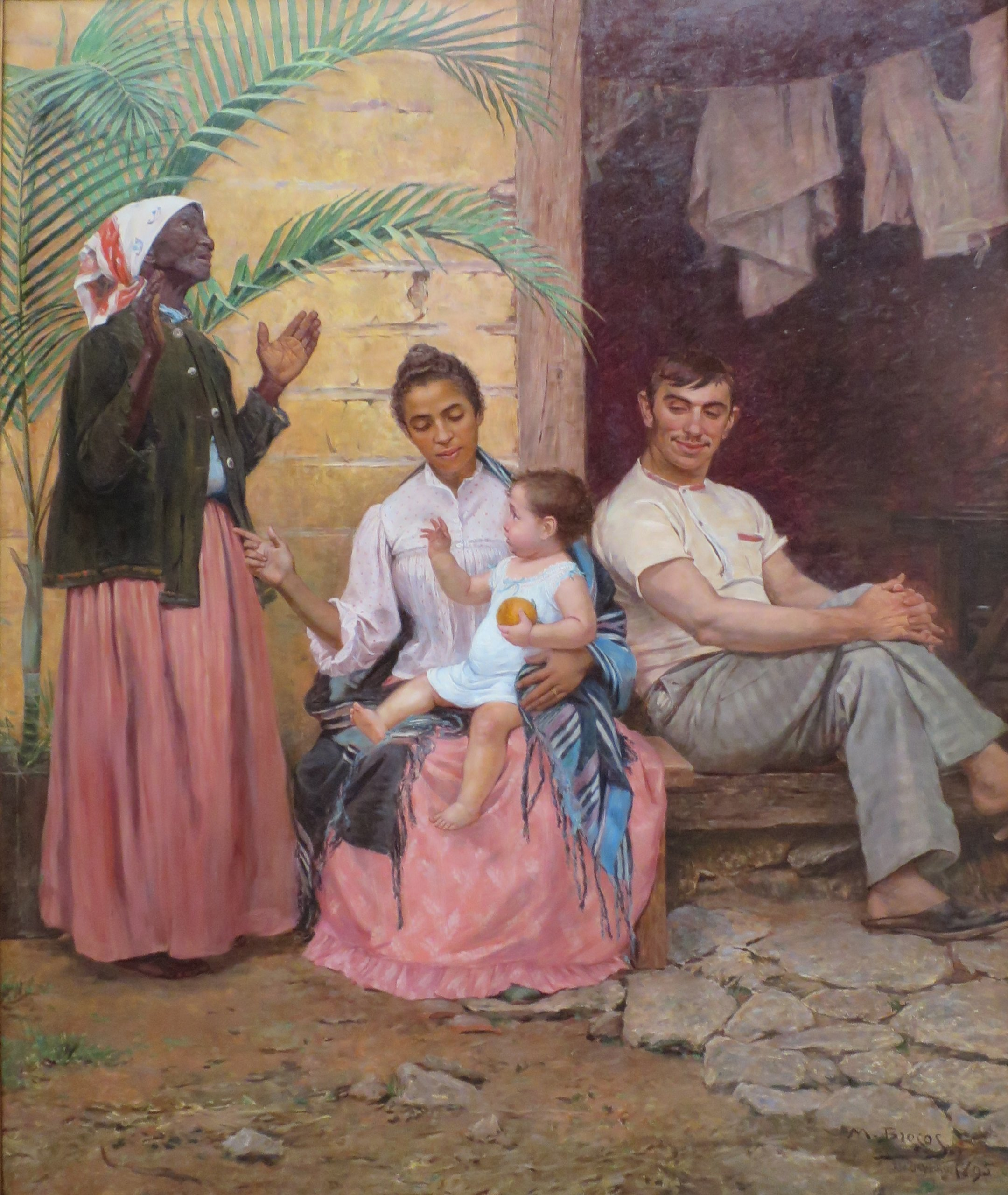
- Artist: Modesto Brocos
- Year: 1895
- Medium: Oil on poplar panel
- Subject: Branqueamento
- Dimensions: 199 cm × 166 cm (78 in × 65 in)
- Location: Museu Nacional de Belas Artes, Rio de Janeiro

Ham's Redemption, in Portuguese: A Redenção de Cam; is an oil painting by Galician painter Modesto Brocos in 1895. Brocos completed the work while teaching at the National School of Fine Arts of Rio de Janeiro.

The painting deals with the controversial racial theories of the late nineteenth century, and the phenomenon of the search for the gradual "branqueamento" (or whitening) of the generations of the same family through miscegenation.

The work earned Modesto Brocos y Gómez a gold medal at the National Salon of Fine Arts in 1895, and is an example of the direction Brazilian art took in the late nineteenth century.

== Description and analysis of painting ==
The painting is the fruit of a moment of post-emancipation, marked by the adhesion of racialism in the public sphere and the "necessity" of actions in relation to the destiny of the black and mixed population in the free and republican order. The painting alludes to the first book of the Bible, Genesis, Chapter 9. In the episode, a drunk and naked Noah is exposed, instead of covered, by his son Ham to the latter's brothers Shem and Japheth. For bringing shame upon him, Noah condemns Ham to be a slave along with his son Canaan, who is cursed as "the servant of the servants". Noah prophesied that he, Ham, would be "the last of the slaves of his brethren." Ham was later described as the supposed father of the African races. This was a basis for white Christians from the 16th to the 17th centuries to justify slavery in colonial economies.

The painting shows a sort of reversal of the "curse" of African descent. The work is notable for its artistic realism, showing gradations of skin color between the three generations. The baby is the whitest, followed by the father, sitting next to the mother, who holds the child in her lap. The grandmother, in the left corner, has the darkest skin. She is raising her hands to the sky giving thanks. By being born white, her grandchild was freed from the "curse" of being black, since her daughter, a mulata, had married the white man.

This gradation of color notably follows from left to right, showing the process of miscegenation. Here, it is not only a question of cultural and racial elimination, but also of the desire for progress that, in Brocos's eyes, would come only through the "laundering" of the population and the approximation to European culture, eliminating and ignoring other ethnicities and customs.

This denial of African culture becomes apparent in the clothes of the female figures; both women wear westernized clothes instead of clothes that recall their African descent. The seated woman is fully clothed, making her look more European than African. This presents the ideal of a black women's adjustment to Christian morality and "whitening reproduction". In addition, it is notable that the two characters who do not have white skin are women: the mother and the grandmother, establishing a color opposition to the baby and the father. This is reinforced by the fact that the man is standing on stone, showing an "evolution" in relation to the bare earth under the women's feet. Once again, the white-skinned European is shown as superior, and this is evident even in his pose: his back is turned as he looks at the rest of the scene.

The position of the hands and gazes between the characters brings coherence to the message that Modesto Brocos wanted to pass. There is also a theory that the young mother alludes to the Blessed Virgin Mary and the baby, the Child Jesus. This is due to the woman's shawl being blue, which is linked to Mary in art.

The period in which the work was produced was marked by intense scientific development; however, in referring to the biblical episode narrated in the book of Genesis, the perspective of The Redemption of Ham seems more based on religion than science. The work reflects the racist ideologies of the time by showing the laundering passed on by the family members as something to be praised. As Tatiana Lotierzo and Lilia Schwarcz point out in the article "Gender, Race and Whitening Project: The Redemption of Cam" the adult women in the painting are shown to be voluntarily participating in a process that would extinguish their own ethnic group. The work became the mark of an era that, imbued with racialist thought, left indelible marks in the Brazilian tradition.

== Background: Whitening (Branqueamento) and eugenics in Brazil ==
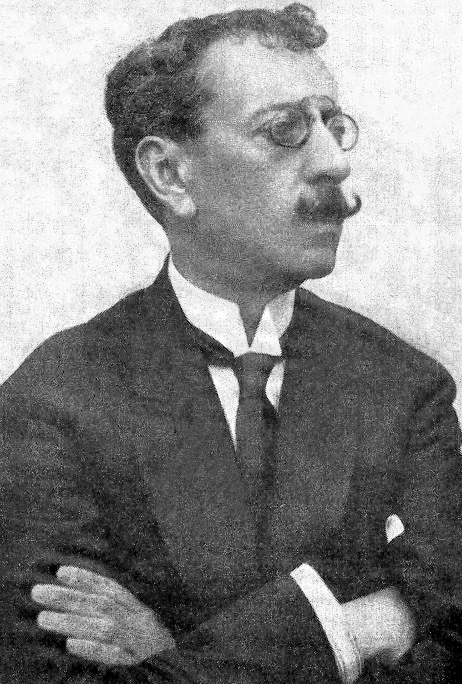
Olavo Bilac, a prominent Brazilian journalist and supporter of eugenics.

In the nineteenth century, the idea of "whitening" society (Portuguese: branqueamento) spread in Brazil, as an ideology which sought to erase black features from the Brazilian population. During the first decades of the twentieth century, industrialization, immigration and urbanization brought a more pessimistic and nationalistic view to the country. The two world wars brought the expansion of nationalism, combining the idea of race with the construction of nationalities.

In Europe, the idea of eugenics was held and disseminated by various scholars, including Francis Galton in 1883. Galton, a cousin of Charles Darwin, attempted to apply the principles of natural selection to human society. His belief was that intellectual capacity was hereditary. He analyzed the family trees of approximately 9,000 families, and came to the conclusion that non-handicapped white people displayed the best intellectual and social "performances" compared to those of other races and ethnicities. This pattern was based on the racialist thesis that the Europeans had greater beauty, civilizational competence and health than the "other races", namely black (African), "red" (American Indigenous) and "yellow" (Asian) people.

The earliest records of eugenics in Brazil appeared at the end of the first decade of the nineteenth century. In 1917, the physician and pharmacist Renato Kehl, was responsible for expanding and disseminating eugenics in Brazil. Kehl believed that the only way for the country to thrive was through a project that focused on the predominance of the white race and the whitening of the black population. In addition to segregation by skin color, his discourse also supported the exclusion of the disabled (either physical or mental) from society. He also defended the sterilization of criminals, the regulation of a prenuptial examination (to ensure that the bride was a virgin), examinations to ensure divorce if the woman had "illegitimate children" or had proven hereditary defects in her family, compulsory eugenic education in schools, and tests to measure mental capacity in children from 8 to 14 years of age. Kehl presented his thoughts in various congresses, and had an impact on groups of teachers, physicians and adherents of racial hygiene. In 1918, first eugenic society of Latin America, the Eugene Society of São Paulo (SESP), was founded. Some well-known members of the group included Arnaldo Vieira de Carvalho, Olavo Bilac, Alfredo Ellis, Belisário Penna, Vital Brazil, Artur Neiva, Luís Pereira Barreto, Antonio Austregésilo, Juliano Moreira, Afrânio Peixoto and Monteiro Lobato.

In subsequent years, eugenics aroused the interest of the Brazilian elite, who created the concept of the "Brazilian man", excluding all those who did not fit in with their ideals. There was a belief that the movement would promote a reform of the aesthetic, hygienic and moral values of Brazilian society. At the time, the ideal brought forth an even more patriarchal society. Here, women had the simple role of "procreating" and performing the domestic tasks assigned by their husbands. The "national identity" crossed limits and brought to light the racism present in the upper strata of Brazilian society.

== Brocos and his support for eugenics ==
Modesto Brocos never denied his support for eugenics. In 1930, thirty-five years after painting, the artist released a work of science fiction, Viaje a Marte ("Trip to Mars"). In it, the painter himself appears as a character who describes his visit to a planet where there is a policy of reproduction controlled by the state - the Agricultural Army and the Humanitarian Sisters - all white volunteers. Even though it is a book of fiction, Brocos makes his eugenic and racist ideas explicit, for example when he says that humanity was not satisfied, because there still had to be a "unification of races". He adds that in earlier times, with the "yellow" race, mestizaje had been easier, but that with the black race, although there was the same process, the color "presented difficulties to be mixed."

== Eugenics symbol ==
The work is considered one of the most racist and reactionary paintings of the nineteenth century, bringing with it the symbolism of elitist thinking. The painting appears in a post-abolitionist process of the new republic, which sought progress using Europe as a model. In the eyes of the elite, whiteness represented progress, while blackness represented the past. In this context the eugenics and whitening mentioned earlier, miscegenation is proposed as a solution, leaving the population with an increasingly European profile. The painting is simply a visual representation of the subject present in the discourse of the intellectuals of the time.

In 1911, the then director of the National Museum of Rio de Janeiro, João Batista de Lacerda used the painting as an illustration of his article entitled Sur les métis au Brésil (French, "About the mixed-race in Brazil") at the First Universal Race Congress in Paris. The Congress brought together intellectuals from all over the world to discuss the relationship of races to the process of civilization. Lacerda's work, considered one of the main exponents of the "whitening thesis", came out in defense of the miscegenation, presenting the positivity of this process in Brazil and showing the supposed superiority of the white races in relation to the black and indigenous populations. In presenting the painting of Brocos, he described it as follows: "The black going white in the third generation, by the effect of the crossing of races." In his speech, he affirmed that in a century the Brazilian population would be mostly white; that is, by 2011 or 2012, the black population would be extinct, and the mixed-race would represent a maximum of 3% of the population.

Between the 1920s and 1930s, it was no longer possible to distinguish between Brazilians who identified themselves as exiled Europeans and the local population, since the mixture between indigenous peoples, blacks and whites constituted a miscegenation that went beyond the standards imposed by high, white society. Thus, the elite had almost a need to create a new Brazilian identity, with the desire to be different from any model, and the eugenics ideal lost much of its strength.

== See also ==
- Brazilian painting
- Slavery in Brazil
- Miscegenation
