= João Baptista de Lacerda =

Brazilian biomedical scientist and physician

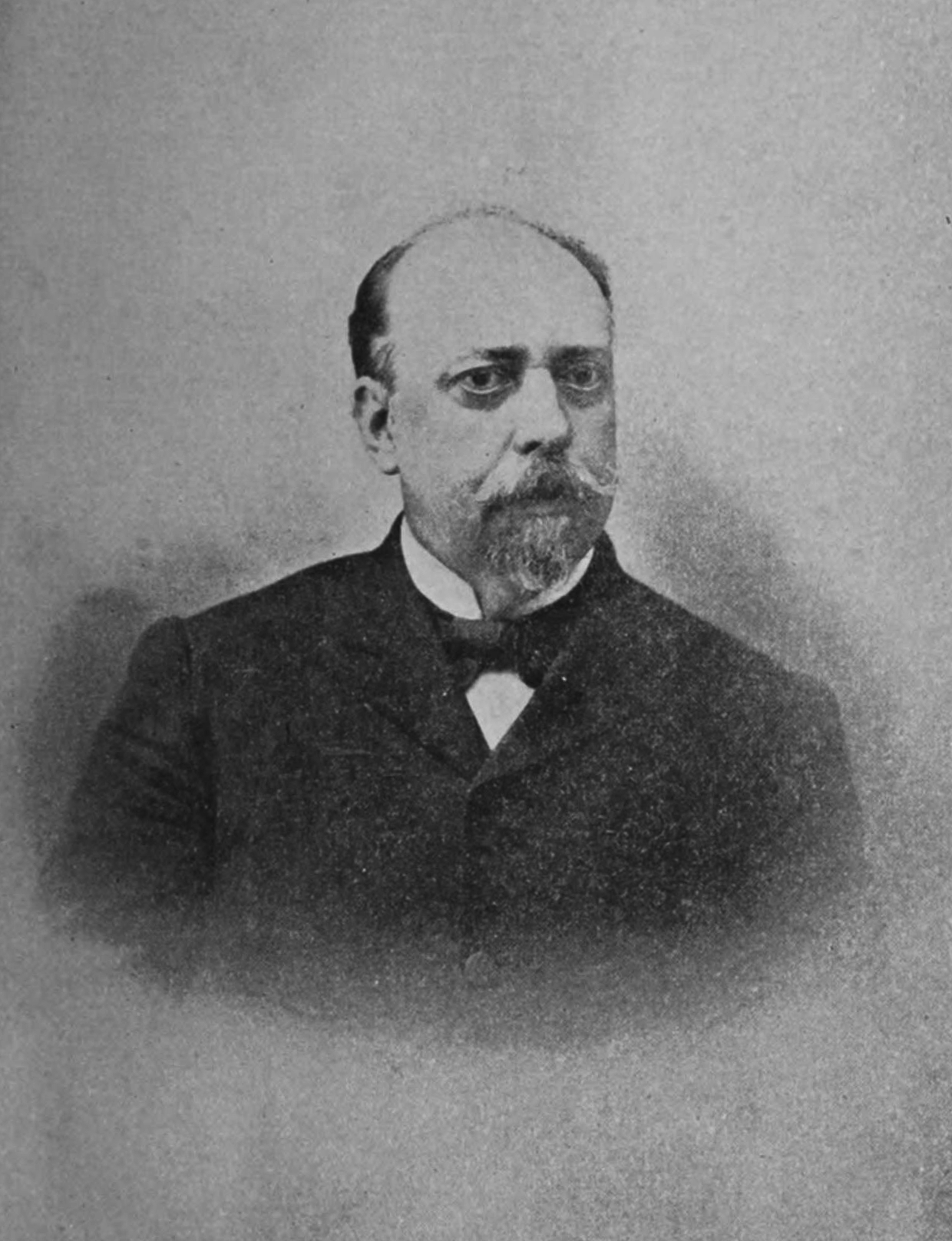
- Born: 12 July 1846; Campos dos Goytacazes, Empire of Brazil
- Died: August 6, 1915 (aged 69); Rio de Janeiro, Brazil
- Education: Medical School of Rio de Janeiro
- Scientific career
- Fields: Scientist; Medicine

João Batista de Lacerda (12 July 1846 – 6 August 1915), was a physician and one of the pioneering Brazilian biomedical scientists in the fields of experimental physiology and pharmacology.

== Biography ==
Born in Campos dos Goytacazes in 1846, João Baptista de Lacerda graduated in medicine from the Medical School of Rio de Janeiro and returned to Campos to open a private practice. Soon after, he was invited by the Minister of Agriculture to be the associate director of the section of anthropology, zoology and paleontology of the recently created National Museum of Natural History of Rio de Janeiro, by Emperor D. Pedro II. Later, he assumed also the associate directorship of the Laboratory of Experimental Physiology, under the French physiologist Louis Couty, who had been invited to the post. In this position, Lacerda carried out successfully a number of experimental investigations on curare and the poisons of Brazilian snakes, frogs and lizards. One of his important discoveries was the helpful effect of potassium permanganate to treat snake bites. In the field of archeo-anthropology, he was one of the first to study human fossil remains in Brazil and was awarded the bronze medal of the Anthropological Exhibit of Paris in 1878.

An indefatigable worker, Lacerda also began research on microbiology, beriberi and yellow fever. He also studied several infectious diseases of agricultural importance, such as in horses and cattle. Most of the research carried out in his lab was published in the National Museum's own periodical, the Arquivos do Museu Nacional, as well as in other national and foreign journals. After Couty died unexpectedly, Lacerda became the Laboratory director and greatly inspiring force; later, he also served as the general director of the National Museum and as a member and president of the Brazilian Imperial Academy of Medicine.

=== Racial whitening thesis ===
The medical anthropologist João Baptista de Lacerda was one of the main exponents of the "thesis of racial whitening" among Brazilians, having participated, in 1911, in the Universal Congress of Races, in London. This congress brought together people from all over the world to debate the issue of racialism and the relationship between races and the progress of civilizations (themes of current interest at the time). Baptista took to the event the article Sur les métis au Brésil (About the mestizos of Brazil, in Portuguese), in which he defended the miscegenation factor as something positive, in the Brazilian case, due to the overlapping of the white race traits on the others, black and indigenous.

In an excerpt from the referred article, Baptista states:

The mixed population of Brazil should have, within a century, a very different aspect from the current one. The currents of European immigration, increasing every day the white element of this population, will end up, after a certain time, by suffocating the elements in which some traces of the black could still persist.

In this passage, one can clearly see the content of the yearning for whitening. The intellectual currents that influenced the thinking of Baptista and other advocates of eugenics were varied and ranged from the determinism of Henry Thomas Buckle and the Social Darwinism of Spencer to the theories of Gobineau. All these currents, to a large extent, served as an argument to justify the phase of neocolonialism, which focused on the African and Asian continents.

A curious fact of Baptista's presentation at the Universal Congress of Races was the exhibition of a copy of the painting Ham's Redemption, by the Spanish painter Modesto Brocos. This painting was completed in 1895 and presents the image of a family: on the left, a black lady looking up to the sky in gratitude, and a mixed-race woman holding a white child; on the right, a white man watching his wife and son. The image of the painting categorically conveys the thesis that Baptista defended: whitening through generations. Brocos proposes the dilution of the black color in the succession of descendants and inserts, in this succession, the "redemption", the "absolution" of a "cursed race", that is, the descendants of Ham, son of Noah, who, in the book of Genesis, is cursed by his father. Ham's story, despite its biblical symbolism, was interpreted by default by the racialism of the 19th century, in which Brocos was involved. The "darkening" of Ham's descendants would have led to the black African race, which could be redeemed by mixing with the white European race.

== Quote ==
In general, in Brazil, the men dedicated to studies and to science constitute a kind of noble proletariat, who exist on small salaries, hardly sufficient for a modest living. Neglecting the frivolous grandeurs of the world and feeling the inexpressible pleasures that scientific research communicates, they comply with this situation and accept it without constraint.
