= Racism in Brazil =

Racism has been present in Brazil since its colonial period and is pointed as one of the major and most widespread types of discrimination, if not the most, in the country by several anthropologists, sociologists, jurists, historians and others. The myth of a racial democracy, a term originally coined by Brazilian sociologist Gilberto Freyre in his 1933 work Casa-Grande & Senzala (The Masters and the Slaves), is used by many people in the country to deny or downplay the existence and the broad extension of racism in Brazil.

Racism was made illegal under Brazil's anti-discrimination laws, which were passed in the 1950s after Katherine Dunham, an African-American dancer touring Brazil, was barred from a hotel. Nonetheless, race has been the subject of multiple intense debates over the years within the country.

== Definition of race in Brazil ==
Because the country has a long history of miscegenation, color lines in Brazil have long been blurred. At the same time, more and more people see themselves as Black and seek to reclaim their Blackness due to the Black pride and Black power movements.

The Brazilian census organizes the population into five, albeit imperfect, racial groups. These are branco (white), preto (black), pardo (brown, or multi-racial), amarelo (yellow, or Asian), and indígena (indigenous). Because there was never a legal genetic definition for these categories, throughout history, each of these racial groups has been defined in different ways. Racial classification in Brazilian society is often inconsistent and influenced by a myriad of factors including: class, status, education, location and phenotype. For example, a light-skinned multiracial person who held an important, well-paying position in society may be considered branco while someone else with the same ethnogenetic make up who had darker skin or was of a lower class may be considered pardo or even preto.

== History ==
=== Slavery and abolition ===
Soon after the Portuguese began to settle in Brazil in the year 1500, they began to enslave the indigenous population in order to sustain their growing sugar economy. However, European induced wars and disease quickly began to deplete the indigenous populations and Portuguese settlers soon looked to Africa to satisfy their labor demands. By the end of the slave trade in 1850, the Brazilian colony had imported an estimated four million slaves from Africa, the largest number of any other country in the Americas and seven times more than what was imported to the United States. Slavery brought with it dehumanization of Africans and a multitude of negative stereotypes that set the stage for a racial hierarchy in Brazil where blacks and those of African descent would become the subservient class to whites.

Along with being the largest importer of Africans during the slave trade, Brazil was also the last country in the Americas to eradicate slavery. Calls for the end of slavery in Brazil began in the early 19th century. In 1825, José Bonifácio Andrada e Silva, who was a prominent figure in leading Brazil to independence from Portugal, was in high favor of gradual emancipation. Britain also contributed to the push for abolition in Brazil, by abolishing the slave trade. This was a significant move due to the fact that the United Kingdom was Brazil's main trade partner. A small amount of legislation also helped lead up to the official abolition of slavery in 1888. First, in 1871 the Law of the Free Womb declared that all the children of slaves that were born after the law was passed were to be freed; followed by the 1885 Sexagenarian Law, which freed slaves over sixty years of age.

The Golden Law. National Archives of Brazil.

A large contributor to the lengthy abolition process in Brazil was in part due to the dynamics of the royal family. By the 1870s, the last emperor, Pedro II had only one surviving child, the princess Isabel. Due to her gender and her marriage to a foreigner, Isabel had trouble gaining support, despite having twice served as regent during her father's reign. During her brief time as regent, she took small measures to abolish slavery. Due to the obstacles she faced, she had to appoint an entirely new cabinet in order to completely abolish slavery. She succeeded, and the abolition of slavery was referred to as the Golden Law.

=== Post-emancipation Brazil (1888 – early 1900s) ===
The abolition of slavery in Brazil meant the end of legal segregation between blacks and whites. However, racism did not die with the abolition of slavery. The racial hierarchies put in place by slavery stood strong after abolition. There was no period of "reconstruction" such as that which was instituted in the United States. Rather, newly freed black Brazilians were left to create a life for themselves out of nothing—no land, money, or education. This disadvantaged state left the country with massive amounts of inequality between whites and non-whites. Because of this, the conversation about race in Brazil became closely intertwined with conversations about poverty and class.

Though there were no laws directly targeting those of African descent on the basis of race, there were laws that were put in place that created inequality between whites and blacks. For example, when Brazil first became a republic in 1889, voting was restricted to literate men, which barred the majority of the black population from voting since there were large disparities in education after the abolition of slavery. In addition to this, there was a redefining of crime that criminalized many aspects of African culture.

==== Eugenics ====
In the late nineteenth and early twentieth centuries, fear began to spread among the elite classes about how Brazil's early history of miscegenation would affect its development. This fear, in combination with the growing popularity of using pseudoscience to explain racial differences, led to the growth of different forms of pseudoscientific racism and, particularly, eugenics in Brazil.

European critics had long criticized Brazil's racially diverse society for its lack of "racial purity". Eugenics of the time suggested that blacks were inferior, and mulattoes were "degenerate," putting Brazil's large black and mixed populations in question. Further, it was thought that tropical climates, like Brazil's, hindered a country's development. One French eugenicist, Count Arthur de Gobineau, attacked Brazil saying that racial mixing in the country had affected every stratosphere of class making the entire country "lazy, ugly and infertile." These thoughts began to spark fear among Brazil's elite who sought to use ideas of eugenics to better the country's economic standing. One anthropologist who adopted eugenic thought, Raimundo Nina Rodrigues, began to become concerned with the racial mixing occurring in Brazil. He conducted a 'study' on people of African origin in Brazil and found that the ethnic group was "unequivocally inferior." He advocated for separate criminal laws by race and that blacks be subject to separate laws because they were not free to choose crime because of their diminished capacities. However, Rodrigues himself was mixed race and expressed confusion about the status of mixed race individuals in the racial hierarchy. To counter this, he proposed the creation of several categories to express the spectrum of mixed people going from superior to ordinary, to degenerate.

In the end, eugenics in Brazil never took on as strong as it did in Europe, North America, or Australia. Some attribute the pseudoscience's limited success to the fact that Brazil already had a very large mixed-race population. Nina Rodrigues' confusion about how racial superiority works outside of a racial binary demonstrates this thought. Even at the time slavery was abolished in 1888, 6 percent of all marriages were interracial. This means that, at some level, racial barriers had already been broken down, making it difficult to institute hardline eugenics policies like segregation or racial sterilization. Others argue that the large presence of Catholicism in Brazil may have saved the country from harsher racial policies.

"The broad influence of Catholicism in Brazil and the rest of Latin America constrained eugenicists' interventions in discussions on marriage restrictions and human reproduction. In the eyes of Catholic intellectuals, these were matters of a moral and religious nature and as such not open to political or medical intervention; this kept them from making any more radical proposals such as eugenic sterilization." (From: Sebastião de Souza, Vanderlei (December 2016). "Brazilian Eugenics and Its International Connections: an Analysis Based on the Controversies between Renato Kehl and Edgard Roquette-Pinto, 1920–1930")

==== Policy of racial whitening ====
Racial whitening, or just "whitening" (Brazilian Portuguese: branqueamento), is an ideology that was widely accepted in Brazil between 1889 and 1914, as the solution to the "Negro problem". Amidst discussions of eugenics and the country's demographics hindering its development, the first Brazilian Republic decided to institute a policy of "whitening" wherein it would try to dilute the black population and drive out all signs of African culture. This was done by incentives encouraging immigrants from Europe to come and skew demographics along with suppression of African and Indigenous culture all in an effort to erase the presence of blacks from Brazil. The policy lasted until 1910 and because of it the percentage of whites in Brazil jumped from 34 percent in 1870 to 64 percent in 1940. The idea of racial whitening has become such a prevalent idea that Spanish artist Modesto Brocos painted A Redenção de Cam (Cam's Redemption). The work addressed the controversial racial policy based on eugenics and depicted the phenomenon of gradual whitening of the population over generations.

== Shifting views on race ==
=== 1910–1920s ===
The end of European immigration in 1910 meant the resurfacing of fears among Brazil elite about the "blackening" of the Brazilian population. Suggestions about increasing immigration of Afro- North Americans sparked contentious debates inside and outside of the eugenics community. One such person who was troubled by this idea was eugenicist Renato Khel. Khel was influenced by aggressive eugenics policies that were being used in Germany and advocated for similar policies in Brazil, such as the sterilization of degenerates and criminals. However, the majority of the Brazilian population, including those within the eugenics community, were beginning to see miscegenation as a path to racial harmony.

=== 1930s to 1980s: Brazil as a "racial democracy" ===
As Brazilian society drew farther and farther away from ideas of racial purity, Gilberto Freyre popularized the idea of Brazil as a racial democracy in his book The Masters and the Slaves. Freyre's book transformed the idea of miscegenation into a positive part of Brazilian culture and national identity and it became widely accepted that Brazil's history of intermixing between races had rendered the country a post-racial society, as it would come to be hailed for many years to come. Importantly, the idea of racial democracy became central dogma to the military governments of 1964–1985. While it was in power, the military preferred to think of race as a non-issue and pushed the idea of a unified identity among all Brazilians in order to quell resistance.

During military rule, racial democracy became a consensus among almost all Brazilians. The idea became so popular that the mentioning of race would become taboo and bringing up issues of race was deemed as racist. Some argue that the long consensus of Brazil as a racial democracy was what prevented the country from dealing with issues of racism. In her article "From 'Racial Democracy' to Affirmative Action" Mala Htun argues that the unwillingness of the Brazilian government to define race prevented Afro-Brazilian rights organizations from forming and limited the group's political power. She also argues that refusing to acknowledge race created inaction that allowed for racism to continue.

=== 1980s to present: Emergence of a race-conscious state ===
The common narrative of Brazil as a racial democracy persisted until the 1990s. In 1985, military rule officially ended and the year marked the beginning of re-democratization. The public greatly influenced the writing of the 1988 constitution and black rights organization successfully petitioned for the inclusion of an anti-racist clause that would make racism a punishable offense. In the 1990s, with the reintroduction of democratic systems, the use of NGOs and international organizations brought color consciousness and issues of persisting racial inequality to the forefront of national discussions. In particular, the 2001 Durban conference (World Conference on Racism) attracted large amounts of attention to existing racial inequality. The issue stayed on the front page of national newspapers for months and even prompted comments from the president. In 2003, President Luiz Lula made race a central issue of his presidency and the government began to initiate affirmative action programs.

== Persisting inequality ==
Many Brazilians still think that race impacts life in their country. A research article published in 2011 indicated that 63.7% of Brazilians believe that race interferes with the quality of life, 59% believe it makes a difference at work, and 68.3% in questions related to police justice. According to Ivanir dos Santos (the former Justice Ministry's specialist on race affairs), "There is a hierarchy of skin color: where blacks, mixed race and dark skinned people are expected to know their place in society." Although 54% of the population is black or has black ancestry, they represented only 24% of the 513 chosen representatives in the legislature as of 2018.

For many decades, discussions of inequality in Brazil largely ignored the disproportionate correlation between race and class. Under the racial democracy thesis, it was assumed that any disparity in wealth between white and non-white Brazilians was due to the legacy of slavery and broader issues of inequality and lack of economic mobility in the country. The general consensus was that the problem would fix itself given enough time. This hypothesis was examined in 1982 by sociologist José Pastore in his book Social Mobility in Brazil. In his book, Pastore examines the 1973 household survey and compares the income and occupations of father-son pairs. Based on his findings, he concluded that the level of economic mobility in Brazil should have been enough to overcome inequality left from slavery had opportunities been available equally.

Racial inequality is seen primarily through lower levels of education and income for non-whites than whites. Economic inequality is most dramatically seen in the near absence of non-whites from the upper levels of Brazil's income bracket. According to sociologist Edward Telles, whites are five times more likely to be earning in the highest income bracket (more than $2,000/month). Overall, The salary of Whites in Brazil are, on average, 46% over the salary of Blacks.

Additionally, racial discrimination in education is a well documented phenomenon in Brazil. Ellis Monk, Professor of sociology at Harvard University, found that one unit of darkness in a student's skin corresponds to a 26 percent lower chance of the student receiving more education as compared to lighter-skinned students. Further, a study on racial bias in teacher evaluations in Brazil found that Brazilian math teachers gave better grading assessments of white students than equally proficient and equivalently well-behaved black students.

Quality of Life Indicators vs. Race

Indicators	White Brazilian	Black & Multiracial Brazilian
Illiteracy	3.4%	7.4%
University degree	15.0%	4.7%
Life expectancy	76	73
Unemployment	6.8%	11.3%
Average annual income	R$37,188	R$21,168
Homicide deaths	29%	65.5%

== Studies on racialized violence ==
Due to the ongoing questions surrounding race in Brazil, there have been various studies of violence in the country and whether race was a contributing or main factor in these crimes. One particular study looked at a series of homicides that occurred in Brazil, spanning from 2000 to 2009. The statistics were obtained from the Mortality Information System, which looked at race/skin color, gender and education as explanatory variables for potential causes of racialized killings. In the discussion section, the authors suggested that anti-gun legislation in Brazil has yielded different outcomes among Brazil's population due to race or color. The risk of death by homicide in the white population declined during the period studied. In the black population, the risk of being victimized based on race increased regardless of gender, even after gun control measures took place over the studied period of time.

As the overall homicide rate registered in Brazil has been rising, the number of homicides per 100,000 Preto and Pardo Brazilians also increased from 32.42 in 2006 to 43.15 in 2017, whereas the number of homicides per 100,000 for white and Asian Brazilians has decreased from 17.12 in 2006 to 15.97 recorded in 2017.

Another study determined that in 2008, 111.2% more blacks died proportionally than whites in Brazil. The disparity is especially pronounced among young adults between 15 and 24 years of age. Among whites, the number of murders fell from 6,592 to 4,582 between 2002 and 2008, a difference of 30%. Meanwhile, the murders of young black men rose from 11,308 to 12,749—an increase of 13%. In 2008, 127.6% more young black men died proportionately than whites. Ten years earlier, this difference was 39%. In the state of Paraíba in 2008, 1083% more blacks died than whites. In the state of Alagoas, 974.8% more blacks died than whites. In 11 states, this ratio exceeds 200%.

== See also ==
- Genocide of Indigenous peoples in Brazil
- Human rights in Brazil
- Post-abolition in Brazil
- Race and ethnicity in Brazil
- Racial democracy
- Racial politics in Brazil
- Racial whitening
- Slavery in Brazil
- Social apartheid in Brazil

== Bibliography ==
- Telles, Edward E. (2006). Race in Another America: The Significance of Skin Color in Brazil. Princeton University Press. ISBN 978-0-691-12792-7.
