= Curse of Ham =

Biblical curse imposed on Canaan

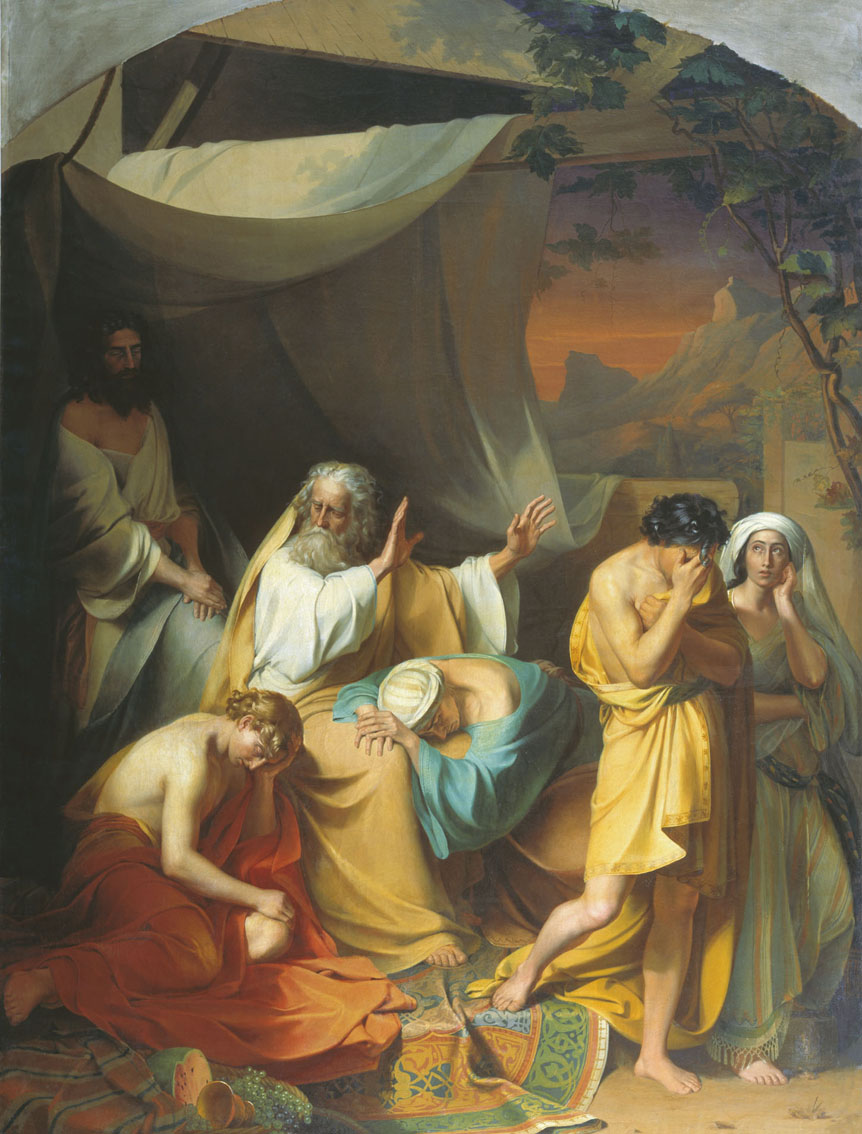
Noah damning Ham, a 19th-century painting by Ivan Stepanovitch Ksenofontov

In the Book of Genesis, the curse of Ham is described as a curse which was imposed upon Ham's son Canaan by the patriarch Noah. It occurs in the context of Noah's drunkenness and it is provoked by a shameful act that was perpetrated by Noah's son Ham, who "saw the nakedness of his father". The exact nature of Ham's transgression and the reason Noah cursed Canaan when Ham had sinned have been debated for over 2,000 years.

The story's original purpose may have been to justify the biblical subjection of the Canaanites to the Israelites, or a land claim to a portion of New Kingdom of Egypt which ruled Canaan in the late Bronze Age.

In later centuries, the narrative was interpreted by some Jews, Christians and Muslims as an explanation for black skin, as well as a justification for enslavement of Black people. Nevertheless, many Christians, Muslims and Jews now disagree with such interpretations, because in the biblical text, Ham himself is not cursed, and neither race nor skin color are ever mentioned.

== Biblical narrative ==
The concept of the curse of Ham finds its origins in Genesis 9:

20 And Noah began to be an husbandman, and he planted a vineyard:
21 And he drank of the wine, and was drunken; and he was uncovered within his tent.
22 And Ham, the father of Canaan, saw the nakedness of his father, and told his two brethren without.
23 And Shem and Japheth took a garment, and laid it upon both their shoulders, and went backward, and covered the nakedness of their father; and their faces were backward, and they saw not their father's nakedness.
24 And Noah awoke from his wine, and knew what his younger son had done unto him.
25 And he said, Cursed be Canaan; a servant of servants shall he be unto his brethren.
26 And he said, Blessed be the Lord God of Shem; and Canaan shall be his servant.
27 God shall enlarge Japheth, and he shall dwell in the tents of Shem; and Canaan shall be his servant.
– Genesis 9:20–27, King James Version

The objective of the story may have been to justify the subject status of the Canaanites, the descendants of Ham, to the Israelites, the descendants of Shem. The narrative of the curse is replete with difficulties. It is uncertain what the precise nature of Ham's offense is. Verse 22 has been a subject of debate, as to whether it should be taken literally, or as "a euphemism for some act of gross immorality". In verse 25, Noah refers to Shem and Japheth as the "brethren" of Canaan, whereas in verse 18 they are identified as his uncles. The Table of Nations presents Canaan and Mizraim (Egypt) among the sons of Ham (10:6). In the Psalms, Egypt is equated with Ham. A land claim on Canaan which fell under the rule of New Kingdom Egypt in the late Bronze Age has been suggested as a motive for the curse on Canaan and the association with Ham via Ancient Egypt's rule over Canaan.

The treatment of Japheth in verses 26–27 raises questions: Why is YHWH named as the God of Shem, but not of Japheth? What does it mean that God will "enlarge" Japheth? And why will Japheth "dwell in the tents of Shem"? Further difficulties include Ham's being referred to as "the youngest son", when all other lists make him Noah's second son. Biblical scholar Nahum Sarna says that the biggest challenge of the narrative is why Canaan was cursed, rather than Ham, and that the concealed details of the shameful incident bear the same reticence as Reuben's sexual transgression.

The narrative's short five verses indicate that Canaan's Hamite paternity must have had great significance to the narrator or redactor, according to Sarna, who adds, "The curse on Canaan, invoked in response to an act of moral depravity, is the first intimation of the theme of the corruption of the Canaanites, which is given as the justification for their being dispossessed of their land and for the transfer of that land to the descendants of Abraham."

== Ham's transgression ==
Scholars have debated the exact nature of Ham's misdeed with many identifying it as either voyeurism, castration, paternal incest, or maternal incest.

=== Voyeurism ===
The majority of commentators, both ancient and modern, have felt that Ham's seeing his father naked and telling his brothers was not a sufficiently serious crime to explain the punishment that follows. Nevertheless, Genesis 9:23, where Shem and Japheth cover Noah with a cloak while averting their eyes, suggests that the act of "seeing (Noah's) nakedness" is to be taken literally, and it has been pointed out that, in first millennium Babylonia, looking at another person's genitals was indeed regarded as a serious matter. Other ancient commentators suggested that Ham was guilty of more than what the Bible says. The 2nd century Targum Onqelos has Ham gossiping about his father's drunken disgrace "in the street" (a reading which has a basis in the original Hebrew), so that being held up to public mockery was what had angered Noah; as the Cave of Treasures (late 6th – early 7th century) puts it, "Ham laughed at his father's shame and did not cover it, but laughed about it and mocked."

=== Paternal incest or castration ===
Ancient commentaries have also debated whether "seeing" someone's nakedness meant to have sex with that person (e.g., Leviticus 20:17). The same idea was raised by third-century rabbis, in the Babylonian Talmud (c. 500 AD), who argue that Ham either castrated his father, or sodomised him. The same explanations are found in three Greek translations of the Bible, which replace the word "see" in verse 22 with another word denoting homosexual relations. The castration theory has its modern counterpart in suggested parallels found in the castration of Uranus by Cronus in Greek mythology and a Hittite myth of the supreme god Anu whose genitals were "bitten off by his rebel son and cup-bearer Kumarbi, who afterwards rejoiced and laughed ... until Anu cursed him".

The medieval commentator Rashi (1040–1105), writes of Ham's offence against Noah: "There are those of our rabbis who say he emasculated [or castrated סרסו] him, and there are those who say he had [homosexual רבעו] relations with him." Rashi cites Sanhedrin 70a, which adds that those who believe that Ham had homosexual relations with his father agree that he also emasculated him. Rashi continues: "What did Ham see that he emasculated him? He said to his brothers: Adam the first man had two sons, yet one killed the other because of the inheritance of the world Cain killed Abel over a dispute how to divide the world between them according to Genesis Rabbah 22:7, and our father has three sons yet he seeks still a fourth son."

=== Maternal incest ===
Some modern scholars, such as Bergsma and Hahn, have suggested that Ham engaged in intercourse with his mother, Noah's wife. Support for this theory can be found in verses such as Leviticus 20:11: "And the man that lieth with his father's wife hath uncovered his father's nakedness". According to this interpretation of the story, Canaan was the offspring of the illicit union between Ham and his mother, which accounts for the curse falling upon Canaan rather than Ham.

=== Disrespecting a religious festival ===
According to Devorah Dimant, the Book of Jubilees depicts Noah planting, harvesting, and drinking wine in accordance with the stipulations of the Torah such that Noah's drunkenness appears less problematic and Ham's offense appears more problematic than in Genesis. Dimant writes that the timing of Noah's viniculture and the procedure of Noah's sacrifice in Jubilees 7:1–6 match Second Temple Judaism interpretations of Leviticus 19:23–25 and Numbers 29:1–6. Thus, Dimant claims "Jubilees alleviates any misgivings that may be provoked by the episode of Noah's drunkenness. In this light, Ham's offense constitutes an act of disrespect not only to his father, but also to the festival ordinances."

== Curse of Canaan ==
- Genesis 9:25: "And he said, Cursed be Canaan; a servant of servants shall he be unto his brethren"

It is noteworthy that the curse was made by Noah, not by God. Some biblical scholars claim that when a curse is made by a man, it could only have been effective if God supports it. However, the curse of Ham and his descendants was not confirmed by God, or at least, it is not mentioned in the Bible that God had confirmed it.

=== Dead Sea Scrolls ===
4Q252, a pesher (interpretation) on the Book of Genesis found among the Dead Sea Scrolls, explains that since Ham had already been blessed by God (Genesis 9:1), he could not now be cursed by Noah. The 4Q252 scroll probably dates from the later half of the first century BC. A century later, the Jewish historian Josephus argued that Noah refrained from cursing Ham because of his nearness of kin, and so cursed Ham's son instead.

A new alternative interpretation of 4Q181, which is a Dead Sea scroll of Genesis, parallels the Book of Jubilees, suggesting that Canaan was cursed because he defied Noah's division of the land.

=== Jubilees ===
The Book of Jubilees also recounts the incident between Ham and Noah, and Noah's resulting curse against Canaan, in similar terms. Later, however, Jubilees explains further that Ham had allocated to Canaan a land west of the Nile (Jubilees 9:1), and all Noah's sons agreed to invoke a curse on anyone who tries to seize land that was not allocated to them (Jubilees 9:14–15). But Canaan violated this agreement and instead chose to squat in the land delineated to Shem and his descendants, and so Canaan brought upon himself the full force of this second curse (Jubilees 10:29–35).

=== Classical Judaism ===
Philo of Alexandria, a 1st-century BC Jewish philosopher, said that Ham and Canaan were equally guilty, if not of whatever had been done to Noah, then of other crimes, "for the two of them together had acted foolishly and wrongly and committed other sins." Rabbi Eleazar decided that Canaan had in fact been the first to see Noah, and had then gone and told his father, who then told his brothers in the street; this, said Eleazar, "did not take to mind the commandment to honour one's father." Another interpretation was that Noah's "youngest son" could not be Ham, who was the middle son: "for this reason they say that this youngest son was in fact Canaan."

According to Rashi, Ham castrated Noah and prevented him from having a fourth son; therefore, Noah cursed Ham's own fourth son, Canaan.

In halakhic legal texts, the term "Canaanite slave" is used generically for any non-Jew (gentile) held in bondage by an Israelite. According to Jewish law, such a slave should undergo a form of conversion to Judaism, after which they are obligated to perform all mitzvot except positive time-dependent mitzvot (just as Jewish women do), granting them a higher status than ordinary non-Jews.

== Racism and slavery ==
In the past, some people claimed that the curse of Ham was a biblical justification for imposing slavery and racial discrimination towards black people, although this concept has been criticized for being an ideologically driven misconception. Regarding this matter, the Baptist Christian leader Martin Luther King Jr. called such an attempt a "blasphemy" that "is against everything that the Christian religion stands for." Senior professor Daniel Heimbach of Southeastern Baptist Theological Seminary presents a scholarly analysis of the text:

The curse of Canaan rationale misinterprets Genesis 9:18–27. Canaan was the youngest son of Noah’s second son Ham, and the curse in this story (sometimes erroneously referred to as the curse of Ham) applied to Canaan and not to Ham. After the flood, Noah got inebriated and passed out in his tent, and someone discovering him made a joke of it. It is not clear who that was, but the text implicates Canaan since Noah treats him as responsible. Another clue is that the culprit is identified as being Noah’s “youngest son” (Gen 9:24). Ham was not Noah’s youngest son (Gen 5:32; 7:13; 10:1). But Canaan was Ham’s youngest son (Gen 10:6), could have been Noah’s youngest grandson when the incident occurred, and Hebrew often uses son (בֵּן, bēn) for offspring without generational precision. Shem and Japheth respect their father’s dignity by covering him, and, afterward, Noah blessed Shem and Japheth and cursed Canaan saying, “He will be the lowest of slaves to his brothers” (Gen 9:25). This text was used to defend enslaving and considering blacks inferior prior to the Civil War, but this interpretation, too, is completely wrong. If anything, black people are descended from Ham’s older sons Cush, Mizraim, and Put and not from his youngest son Canaan (Gen 10:15–19). Canaan’s descendants settled Sidon (Phoenicia), Sodom and Gomorrah, and the Promised Land (land of Canaan). Sodom and Gomorrah were destroyed by God (Gen 19:24–25), Canaanites in the Promised Land were destroyed by Joshua (Deut 7:1–2), and the Bible says nothing connecting Canaan’s line with Africa. The curse of Canaan simply has nothing to do with Africa or blackness.

James Burton Coffman argues that the curse was a "prophecy of what would happen" not that it should happen. He believes that the curse is an allusion to Canaan's history of being dominated by numerous foreign powers. These powers include Assyrians, Chaldeans, Greeks and Romans.

A number of Christian denominations, such as those of Methodism and Quakerism, maintained a theological opposition to slavery and championed abolitionism; for example, speaking out against slavery is one of the Methodist works of mercy. For slaveowners in the Southern United States who were faced with the abolitionist movement to end slavery, the curse of Ham was one of the many grounds upon which planters formulated an ideological defense of slavery. Even before slavery, in order to promote economic motivations within Europe associated with colonialism, the curse of Ham was used to shift the common Aristotelian belief that phenotypic differentiation among humans was a result of climatic difference, to a racialist perspective that phenotypic differentiation among the species was due to there being different racial types. This often came as a result of European anxieties to avoid being sent to the colonies, as they were terrified of the high casualty rate of settlers due to disease and warfare. Thus, many of them formulated the idea that being sent south of the equator "blackened" them and thus made them inferior.

In the 15th century, Dominican friar Annius of Viterbo invoked the Curse of Ham to explain the differences between Europeans and Africans in his writings. Annius, who frequently wrote of the "superiority of Christians over the Saracens", claimed that due to the curse imposed upon black people, they would inevitably remain permanently subjugated by Arabs and other Muslims. He wrote that the fact that so many Africans had been enslaved by the heretical Muslims was supposed proof of their inferiority. Through these and other writings, European writers established a hitherto unheard of connection between Ham, Africa and slavery, which laid the ideological groundwork for justifying the transatlantic slave trade.

Similarly, the Catholic mystic Anne Catherine Emmerich testified that in her visions, she discovered that black people are descendants of Ham: "I see that the Black, idolatrous, stupid nations are the descendants of Ham. Their color is due, not to the rays of the sun, but to the dark source whence those degraded races sprang." She also says that, after killing Abel, Cain's skin darkened.

The historian David Whitford writes of a "curse matrix" which was derived from the vagueness of Genesis 9 and interpreted by racialists to mean that it mattered not who was cursed or which specific group of people the curse originated with, all that mattering being that there was a vague reference to a generational curse that could be exploited by those seeking to justify their actions against black people, such as Southern slaveowners.

Pro-slavery intellectuals were hard-pressed to find a justification for slavery and racism within Christian theology which taught the belief that all humans were descendants of Adam and they were therefore one race, possessed with equal salvation potential and deserving to be treated as kin. The curse of Ham was used to drive a wedge in the mythology of a single human race, as elite intellectuals were able to convince people that the three sons of Noah represented the three sects of Man and their respective hierarchy of different fates. Leading intellectuals in the Southern United States, like Benjamin Morgan Palmer, claimed that white Europeans were descended from Japhet, who was prophesied to cultivate civilization and the powers of the intellect by Noah, but Africans, being the descendants of the cursed Ham, were destined to be possessed by a slavish nature which would be ruled by base appetites.

Some were dismissive of the "Asiatic Japhethites" since they engaged in industries "fitted to the lower capacities of our nature". Others re-interpreted the African descendants of Ham as sympathetic victims, suffering at the hands of Romans, Saracens, Turks and finally, Christian nations who "engaged in the iniquity of the slave trade". Philip Schaff believes this constituted historic prophecy, which is fulfilled gradually.

In the 19th and 20th centuries, the ideology of Social Darwinism was used to subjugate people. During the age of New Imperialism, Social Darwinists exploited what they saw as "lesser breeds without the law" by "superior races". However, Christian missionaries, who saw all humans as descending from Adam and Eve, "were ardently opposed to slavery" and worked for its abolition.

=== Early Judaism, Christianity and Islam ===
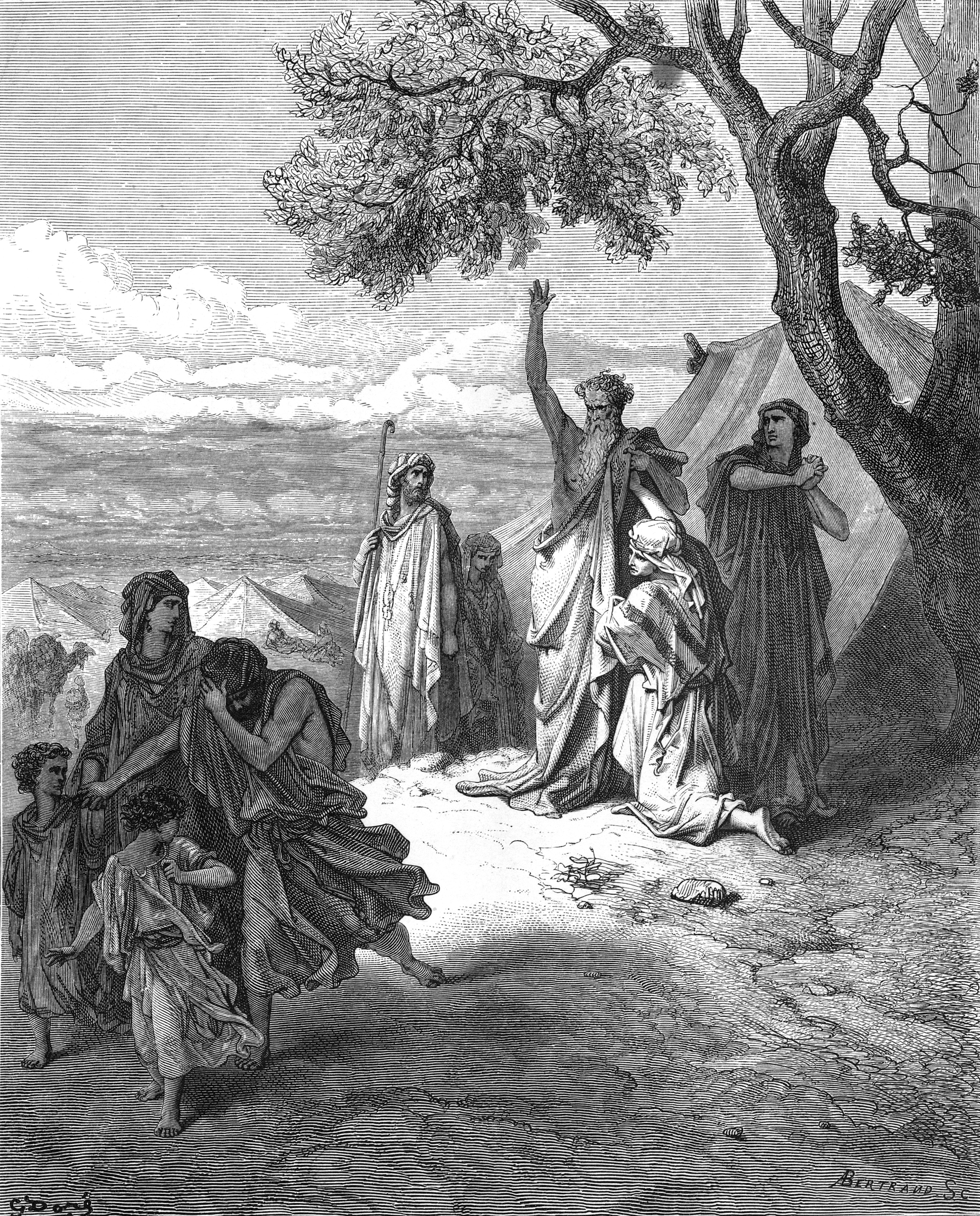
Noah curses Ham by Gustave Doré

While Genesis 9 never says that Ham was black, he became associated with black skin, through folk etymology deriving his name from a similar, but actually unconnected, word meaning "dark" or "brown". The next stage are certain fables according to ancient Jewish traditions. According to one legend preserved in the Babylonian Talmud, Ham broke a prohibition on sex aboard the ark and "was smitten in his skin" as punishment. However, in the Talmud this skin punishment is not described as hereditary or linked to slavery, and in other ancient Jewish sources black skin is seen as beautiful rather than disfiguring.

A link between blackness and slavery becomes more heavily implied in the discussions of early Christian writers like Origen. The suggestion that Canaan was the ancestor of dark-skinned people enters the Biblical tradition with the fourth century Syriac Christian Cave of Treasures.

The concepts were introduced into Islam during the Arab expansion of the 7th century, due to the cross-pollination of Jewish and Christian parables and theology into Islam, called "Isra'iliyyat". It is with the Islamic writers of this time that the dual curse of blackness and slavery first appears, and from this point on it becomes common in both Christian and Muslim sources. Some medieval Muslim writers – including Muhammad ibn Jarir al-Tabari, Ibn Khaldun, and even the later Book of the Zanj – asserted the view that old biblical texts describe the effects of Noah's curse on Ham's descendants as being related with blackness, slavery, and a requirement not to let the hair grow past the ears. The account of the drunkenness of Noah and curse of Ham is not present within the text of the Quran, the Islamic holy book, as it is not consistent with Islamic teachings, since Noah is a prophet, and prophets do not drink alcohol. Islam holds prophets of God in very high esteem, and some Muslims suggest the prophets are infallible.

Historically, other Muslim scholars such as Ahmad Baba al-Timbukti criticized the Curse of Ham narrative and they went on to criticize the association of black Africans with slaves. Others, such as Ibn Kathir, more broadly criticized the Isra'iliyyat tradition, and avoided using such reports when explaining verses of the Quran.

In Islamic tradition, in the Farewell Sermon Muhammad said: "O people, your Lord is one and your father [Adam] is one. There is no superiority of an Arab over a non-Arab, nor a non-Arab over an Arab; no superiority of a white person over a black person, nor superiority of a black person over a white person – except through mindfulness of God."

=== Medieval serfdom and "Pseudo-Berossus" ===
In medieval Christian exegesis, Ham's sin was regarded as laughter (for mocking his father and doing nothing to rectify his condition).

Elsewhere in medieval Europe, the curse of Ham also became used as a justification for serfdom. Honorius Augustodunensis (c. 1100) was the first recorded to propose a caste system associating Ham with serfdom, writing that serfs were descended from Ham, nobles from Japheth, and free men from Shem. However, he also followed the interpretation of 1 Corinthians 7:21 by Ambrosiaster (late 4th century), which held that as servants in the temporal world, these "Hamites" were likely to receive a far greater reward in the next world than would the Japhetic nobility.

The idea that serfs were the descendants of Ham soon became widely promoted in Europe. An example is Dame Juliana Berners (c. 1388), who, in a treatise on hawks, claimed that the "churlish" descendants of Ham had settled in Europe, those of the temperate Shem in Africa, and those of the noble Japheth in Asia (a departure from normal arrangements, which placed Shem in Asia, Japheth in Europe, and Ham in Africa), because she considered Europe to be the "country of churls", Asia of gentility, and Africa of temperance. As serfdom waned in the late medieval era, the interpretation of serfs being descendants of Ham decreased as well.

Ham also figured in an immensely influential work Commentaria super opera diversorum auctorum de antiquitatibus (Commentaries on the Works of Various Authors Discussing Antiquity). In 1498, Annius of Viterbo claimed to have translated records of Berossus, an ancient Babylonian priest and scholar; which are today usually considered an elaborate forgery. However, they gained great influence over Renaissance ways of thinking about population and migration, filling a historical gap following the biblical account of the flood. According to this account, Ham studied the evil arts that had been practiced before the flood, and thus became known as "Cam Esenus" (Ham the Licentious), as well as the original Zoroaster and Saturn (Cronus).

He became jealous of Noah's additional children born after the deluge, and began to view his father with enmity, and one day, when Noah lay drunk and naked in his tent, Ham saw him and sang a mocking incantation that rendered Noah temporarily sterile, as if castrated. This account contains several other parallels connecting Ham with Greek myths of the castration of Uranus by Cronus, as well as Italian legends of Saturn and/or Camesis ruling over the Golden Age and fighting the Titanomachy. Ham in this version also abandoned his wife who had been aboard the ark and had mothered the African peoples, and instead married his sister Rhea, daughter of Noah, producing a race of giants in Sicily.

=== American/European slavery, 17th and 18th centuries ===
The explanation that black Africans, as the "sons of Ham", were cursed, possibly "blackened" by their sins, was sporadically advanced during the Middle Ages, but its acceptance became increasingly common during the slave trade of the eighteenth and nineteenth centuries. The justification of slavery itself through the sins of Ham was well suited to the ideological interests of the elite; with the emergence of the slave trade, its racialized version justified the exploitation of African labour.

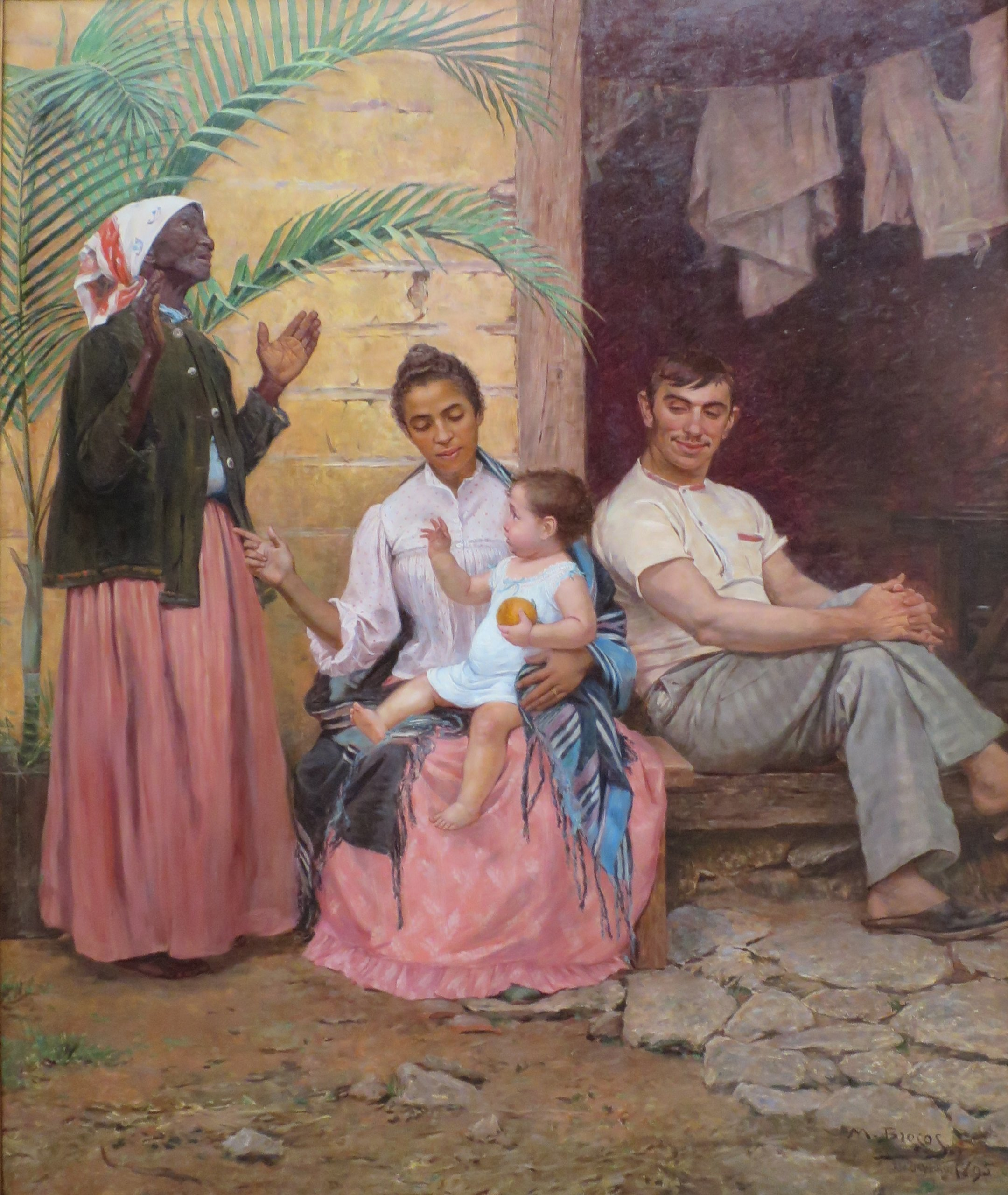
A Redenção de Cam (Ham's Redemption), by Galician-Brazilian painter Modesto Brocos, 1895, Museu Nacional de Belas Artes. The painting depicts a black grandmother, mulatta mother, white father and their quadroon child, hence three generations of racial hypergamy through whitening.

In the parts of Africa where Christianity flourished in its early days, while it was still illegal in Rome, this idea never took hold, and its interpretation of scripture was never adopted by the African Coptic Churches. A modern Amharic commentary on Genesis cites the nineteenth century theory and the earlier European theory which state that blacks were subjected to whites as a result of the curse of Ham, but it calls this belief a false teaching which is unsupported by the text of the Bible, it emphatically points out that Noah's curse did not fall upon all of the descendants of Ham, instead, it only fell upon the descendants of Canaan, and it asserts that the curse was fulfilled when Canaan was occupied by Semites (Israel) and Japhetites. The commentary further notes that Canaanites ceased to exist as a political force after the Third Punic War (149 BC), and as a result, their current descendants are unknown and they are also scattered among all peoples.

The Anglo-Irish scientist Robert Boyle – a seventeenth-century polymath who was also a theologian and a devout Christian – refuted the idea that blackness was caused by the curse of Ham, in his book Experiments and Considerations Touching Colours (1664). There, Boyle explains that the curse of Ham as an explanation for the complexion of coloured people was but a misinterpretation that was embraced by "vulgar writers", travelers, critics, and also "men of note" of his time. In his work, he challenges that vision, explaining:

And not only we do not find expressed in the Scripture, that the Curse meant by Noah to Cham, was the Blackness of his Posterity, but we do find plainly enough there that the Curse was quite another thing, namely that he should be a Servant of Servants, that is by an Ebraism, a very Abject Servant to his Brethren, which accordingly did in part come to pass, when the Israelites of the posterity of Sem, subdued the Canaanites, that descended from Cham, and kept them in great Subjection. Nor is it evident that Blackness is a Curse, for Navigators tell us of Black Nations, who think so much otherwise of their own condition, that they paint the Devil White. Nor is Blackness inconsistent with Beauty, which even to our European Eyes consists not so much in Colour, as an Advantageous Stature, a Comely Symmetry of the parts of the Body, and Good Features in the Face. So that I see not why Blackness should be thought such a Curse to the Negroes... [author's italics and capitalization]

A number of other scholars also support the claim that the racialized version of the curse of Ham was devised at that time because it suited the ideological and economic interests of the European elite and the slave traders who wanted to justify their exploitation of African laborers. While Robinson (2007) claims that such a version was non-existent before, historian David Brion Davis also argues that contrary to the claims of many reputable historians, neither the Talmud nor any early post-biblical Jewish writing relates blackness of the skin to a curse whatsoever.

=== Abyssinia ===
In what is now Ethiopia, the Abyssinian Church justified slavery with its version of the Curse of Ham.

=== Latter Day Saint movement ===
In 1835, Joseph Smith, the founder of the Latter Day Saint movement, published a work which was titled the Book of Abraham. It states that the Egyptian king, referred to by the name of Pharaoh, was a descendant of Ham and the Canaanites. Pharaoh ruled justly and was blessed with wisdom but was barred from receiving the priesthood as a result of the curse on Ham. According to the Book of Abraham, all Egyptians descended from the Canaanite lineage. In other books of scripture, the Canaanites are described as having "a blackness c[o]me upon [them]."

The Book of Abraham was later adopted as scripture by the Church of Jesus Christ of Latter-day Saints (LDS Church). This passage is the only one which is found in any Mormon scripture that bars a particular lineage of people from holding the priesthood, and while nothing in the Book of Abraham explicitly states that Noah's curse was the same curse which is mentioned in the Bible or that the Egyptians were related to other black Africans, some leaders later used the verses as justification for the church policy with regard to the priesthood ban. The 2002 edition of the Doctrine and Covenants Student Manual pointed to Abraham 1:21–27 as the reason why black men were not given the priesthood until 1978.

In 1836, Smith believed that the curse of Ham was the explanation for blacks' curse with servitude. He warned those who tried to interfere with slavery that God could do his own work. In 1835 Smith said God had revealed to him that "it is not right that any man should be in bondage one to another". Smith began condemning slavery in the early 1840s. In 1844, when Smith ran for president of the United States in the wake of widespread opposition to Mormon settlement in Illinois, he advocated for the abolition of slavery by the year 1850.

After Smith's 1844 death, Brigham Young became his most popular successor during the succession crisis. Young maintained that Black Africans were under the curse of Ham and he also maintained that those who tried to abolish slavery were going against the decrees of God, although the day would come when the curse would be nullified through the saving powers of Jesus Christ. In addition, based on his interpretation of the Book of Abraham, Young believed that, as a result of this curse, blacks were banned from holding the priesthood.

In 1978, LDS Church president Spencer W. Kimball said that he received a revelation that extended the priesthood to all worthy male members of the church without regard to race or color. In 2013, the LDS Church denounced the curse of Ham explanation for the withholding of the priesthood from black Africans.

== See also ==
- Afrikaner Calvinism
- Anti-African sentiment
- Anti-Black racism
- Christian views on slavery
- Generations of Noah
- Hamitic
- Historical race concepts
- History of Christian thought on persecution and tolerance
- Islamic views on slavery
- Jewish views on slavery
- Mormonism and slavery
- Mormon teachings on skin color
- Racism in Jewish communities
- Racism in Muslim communities
- Slavery and religion
