= Louis Couty =

French physician and physiologist (1854–1884)

Louis Couty

Louis Couty (13 January 1854 in Nantiat, France – 22 November 1884 in Rio de Janeiro, Empire of Brazil) was a French medical doctor and physiologist. He worked at the Laboratory of Experimental Physiology at the National Museum of Rio de Janeiro, the first of its kind in Brazil. He was a collaborator of João Baptista de Lacerda (1846-1915), a Brazilian physiologist who was the lab's founder.

Couty studied in France with Alfred Vulpian (1826–1887) and Charles-Édouard Brown-Séquard (1817–1894). He came to Brazil to lecture on Industrial Biology at the Escola Politécnica do Rio de Janeiro. Disappointed with its local conditions, he asked to carry out his experimental research at the National Museum, where Lacerda was already active with a research line on snake venom and other toxins. Couty began to study curare, a plant poison, and his first published paper was on its physiological properties, in 1876. Hearing about his work, the Brazilian emperor Dom Pedro II visited the Laboratory and invited him to be its first director, providing also the necessary resources to support the research lines.

Couty also did experiments on other toxic plants and animals, the physiological effects of climate, on the pharmacology of mate, coffee, sugar cane alcohol, etc. He also studied brain physiology in monkeys and even adventured himself into sociology, writing in 1881 an important book, one of the earliest sociological analyses published about the country, "Slavery in Brazil". In this work, Couty proved that Brazil, on the basis of the census of 1872, had a very small organised middle class and that slave owners (only about 500,000 in 12 million total, in a land of 5 million square km) were the "real" economical and political elite. Hence, his famous boutade, "Brazil has no people".

He died unexpectedly at 30 years of age, after living less than 8 years in Rio, and his brilliant career, which could have been so important to the development of Brazilian physiology, was cut short. Couty's place in the history of biomedical science is preserved in a fresco painting at the entrance of the basic sciences building of the Federal University of São Paulo.
