= Belisário Penna =

Brazilian physician

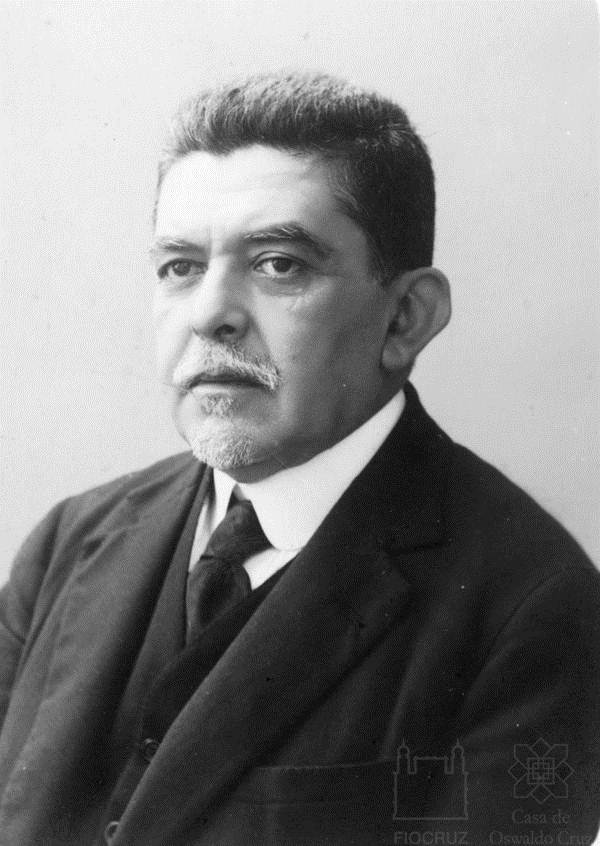
- Born: November 29, 1868; Barbacena, Minas Gerais, Brazil
- Died: November 4, 1939 (aged 70); Engenheiro Paulo de Frontin, Rio de Janeiro, Brazil
- Citizenship: Brazilian
- Education: Faculty of Medicine of Bahia
- Occupations: Physician, scientist, politician, civil server

Belisário Augusto de Oliveira Penna (November 29, 1868 – November 4, 1939) was a Brazilian physician and sanitarist. An advocate of sanitary reform and modernization in Brazil, he served as Minister of Education and Public Health in two occasions. Penna is one of the patrons of the Brazilian Academy of Medicine.

== Biography ==
Born in Barbacena to a family of wealthy landowners, the son of the Viscount of Carandaí (pt), Penna attended the old Colégio Abílio (pt), which inspired the novel O Ateneu. He enrolled at the Faculty of Medicine of Rio de Janeiro before transferring to the Faculty of Medicine of Bahia, from which he graduated.

Following his return to Barbacena, Penna began his clinical practice and was elected as a municipal councilor. Facing financial hardships, he moved to Rio de Janeiro to work at the Diretoria Geral de Saúde Pública, where he was tasked with combating smallpox. In 1905, he worked as a Rural Sanitation inspector, and studied the larval development of Yellow-Fever-transmitting mosquitoes, proposing sanitary measures for eliminating transmission foci that were successfully employed.

In 1906, Penna was dispatched to the north of Minas Gerais with Carlos Chagas to help contain malaria outbreaks. In 1910, Penna and Oswaldo Cruz embarked on a scientific expedition to Rondônia, where they examined the local sanitary conditions and developed a plan to control malaria. In 1912, he undertook another expedition, this time with Artur Neiva, travelling through Bahia, Pernambuco, Piauí, and Goiás, to collect data for the Oswaldo Cruz Institute.

In 1914, Penna resumed his role as a sanitary inspector in Rio de Janeiro, and two years later he established in Vigário Geral the first rural sanitation post in Brazil. In 1918, he published the book Saneamento do Brasil, a collection of news articles he had written. The same year, Penna assumed the direction of the Serviço de Profilaxia Rural, which helped create sanitary posts thoroughout Brazil.

In 1924, Penna published the book Higiene para o Povo, a didatic work on public health. In 1924, he supported the Revolution of 1924 against the government of Artur Bernardes, being subsequently arrested. Following the Revolution of 1930, which Penna supported, he was appointed by Getúlio Vargas as Minister of Education and Public Health.

In 1935, Penna joined the Brazilian Integralist Action, becoming a militant. After the Integralist Uprising, he moved to his farm in the countryside of Rio de Janeiro, where he spent his last days. He died in 1939 from cardiac arrest.
