= Antônio Austregésilo =

Brazilian neurologist (1876–1960)

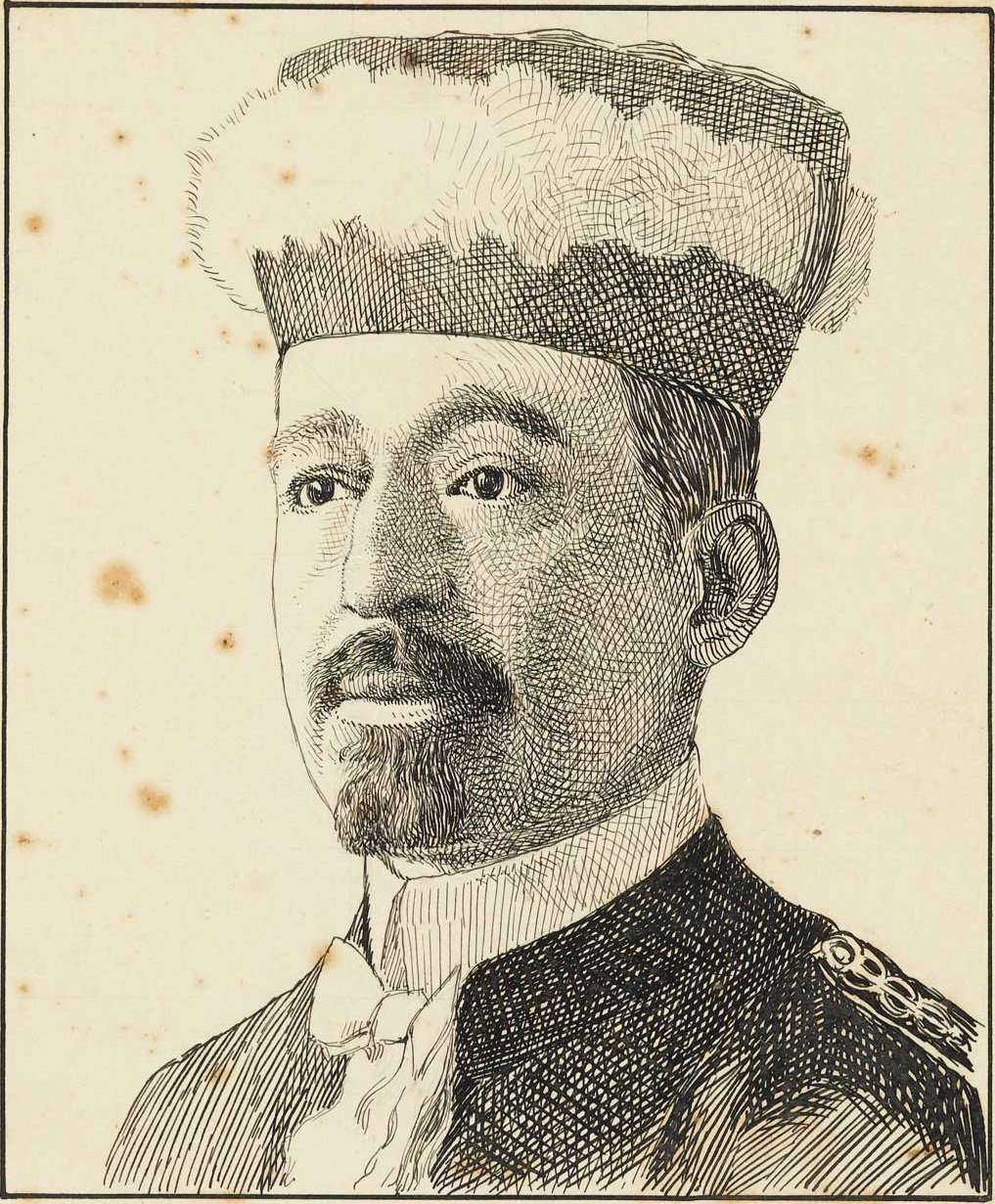

Federal Deputy for Pernambuco
- In office 1 February 1921 – 24 October 1930

Personal details
- Born: 21 April 1876 Recife, Pernambuco, Brazil
- Died: 23 December 1960 (aged 84)
- Occupation: Physician

Antônio Austregésilo (April 21, 1876 – December 23, 1960), was a Brazilian neurologist important to the history of the field in his nation. He has been described as a pioneer of neurology in Brazil and of the study of movement disorders in the country, creating one of the first neurological schools in Rio de Janeiro and publishing early clinical descriptions of abnormal movements.

Austregésilo was born in Pernambuco. He helped build the first neurological school in Rio de Janeiro. He was a member of the Academia Brasileira de Letras and a President of the Academia Nacional de Medicina.

He was federal deputy for Pernambuco from 1921 to 1930.
