= Arnaldo Vieira de Carvalho =

Brazilian physician (1867–1920)

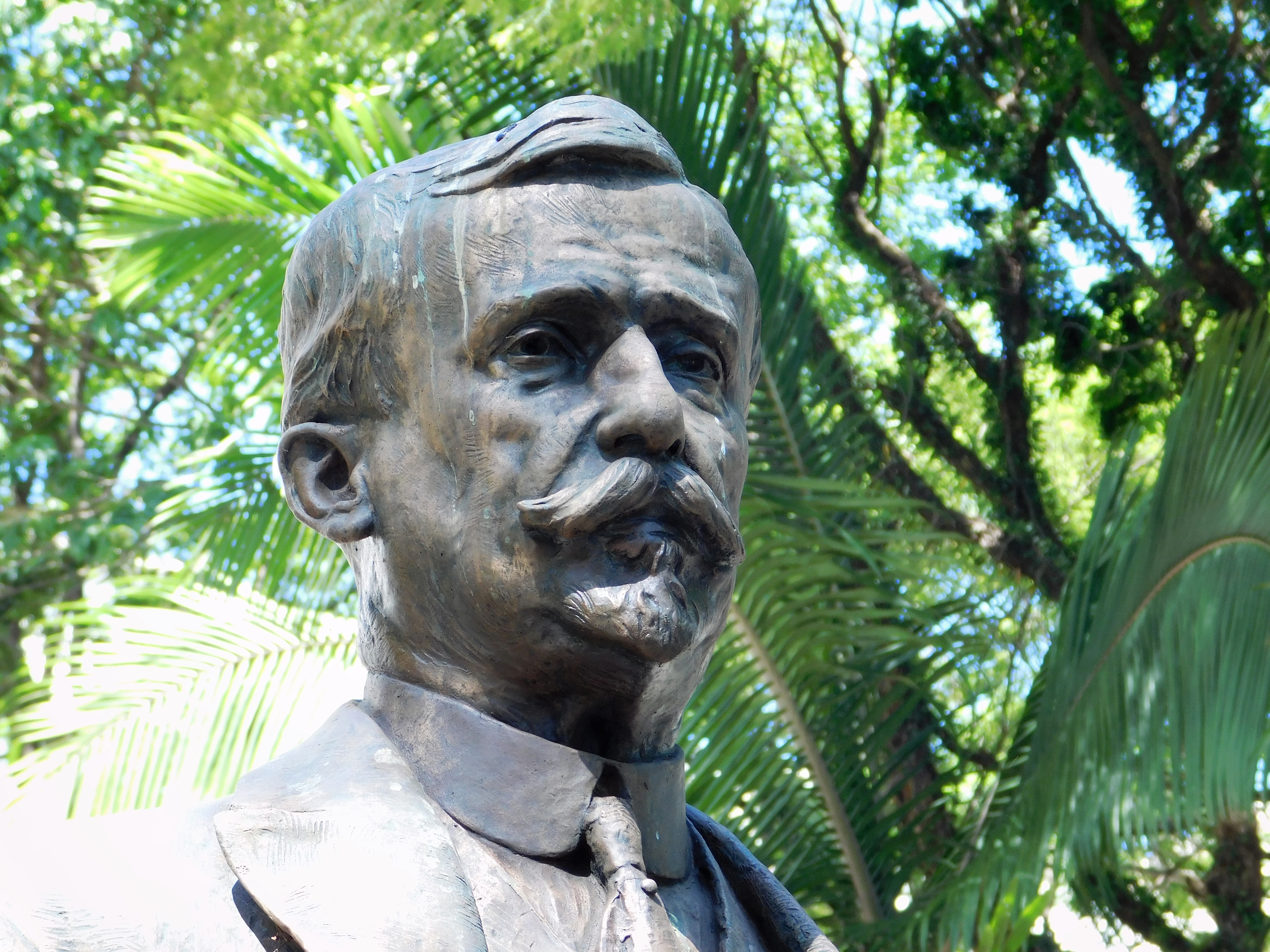
- Born: January 5, 1867; Campinas, São Paulo, Brazil
- Died: June 5, 1920 (aged 53); São Paulo, São Paulo, Brazil
- Citizenship: Brazilian
- Education: National Faculty of Medicine
- Notable work: Da Psychophysiologia e Pathologia Musicaes (1911)

Arnaldo Augusto Vieira de Carvalho (January 5, 1867 – June 5, 1920) was a Brazilian physician. He was the founder and first director of the Faculty of Medicine of São Paulo [pt], now part of the University of São Paulo.

== Biography ==
Born in Campinas, the son of an accomplished lawyer and politician, Carvalho completed his education at the Faculty of Medicine of Rio de Janeiro, moving to São Paulo to begin his clinical practice. A staff member at hospital Santa Casa, he worked as a consultant and as a surgeon before assuming the direction of the Hospital. He was one of the founding members of the Society of Medicine and Surgery of São Paulo.

As a journalist, Carvalho was engaged in discussions on public health and eugenics. He proposed the establishment of a Medicine School in the city of São Paulo, which took place in 1912, with a decree issued by state governor Rodrigues Alves. As the school's first director, Carvalho organized its staff and structure in collaboration with the Rockefeller Foundation. He also directed the so-called Vacinogenic Institute, currently known as Instituto Butantan.
