= Artur Neiva =

Brazilian physician

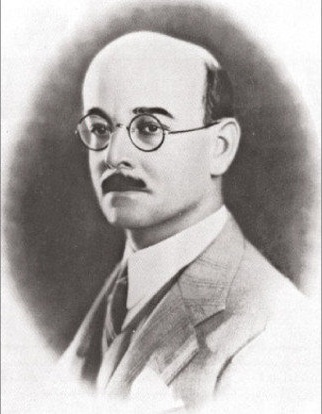
- Born: March 22, 1880; Salvador, Bahia, Brazil
- Died: June 6, 1943 (aged 63); Rio de Janeiro, Rio de Janeiro (state), Brazil
- Citizenship: Brazilian
- Education: Federal University of Rio de Janeiro
- Known for: Having described the insect Triatoma infestans; Having elaborated public health measures to combat syphilis

Artur Neiva (March 22, 1880 – June 6, 1943) was a Brazilian physician, entomologist, ethnographer, and politician who served as federal interventor of the state of Bahia.

== Biography ==
Born in Salvador, Neiva began his studies at the Faculty of Medicine of Bahia before transferring to the Faculty of Medicine of Rio de Janeiro, from which he graduated. He was a disciple of Oswaldo Cruz at the Sorotherapic Institute. In 1911, Neiva described the bug Triatoma infestans, the main vector of Trypanosoma cruzi. As a public health professional, he conducted sanitary campaigns against malaria. In 1912, alongside fellow physician Belisário Penna, he undertook a scientific expedition through Pernambuco, Bahia, Goiás, and Piauí to document and describe the hygienic conditions, geography, climate, fauna, and flora of the regions.

In 1916, Neiva began directing the Sanitary Service of São Paulo, where he planned campaigns to control syphilis. Around that time, he drafted one of the first sanitary codes in Brazil, which prescribed hygienic measures and established public health standards for rural areas.

From 1923 to 1926, Neiva directed the National Museum. Following the Revolution of 1930, he was appointed federal interventor of the state of Bahia, but soon left the office. He later participated in the Constituent Assembly that elaborated the 1934 Constitution, defending eugenicist positions.
