= Faculty of Medicine, Federal University of Rio de Janeiro =

Faculty of Medicine

Faculty of Medicine
- Former names: Escola de Anatomia, Medicina e Cirurgia (1808)
- Type: Public undergraduate faculty
- Established: November 5, 1808
- Location: Rio de Janeiro, Brazil
- Campus: Urban
- Website: https://www.medicina.ufrj.br/

The Faculty of Medicine of the Federal University of Rio de Janeiro (Portuguese: Faculdade de Medicina da Universidade Federal do Rio de Janeiro), historically known as the National Faculty of Medicine, is a unit of the Federal University of Rio de Janeiro.

Founded in 1808 by the Luso-Brazilian physician Correia Picanço, Baron of Goiana, and chartered by the then Prince Regent John VI, who had recently settled in Rio de Janeiro, the Faculty of Medicine is one of the oldest higher education institutions in Brazil, having been established only nine months after the Faculty of Medicine of Bahia. It is currently based in the Cidade Universitária neighbourhood.

As of 2025, the institution was ranked among the top medical schools in Brazil, with an accentuated focus on scientific research.

== History ==
=== Background and Kingdom of Brazil ===
During the colonial period, formal institutions that offered medical training in Brazil were absent, and health services were often provided by individuals educated abroad — notably at the University of Coimbra — as well as priests, folk healers, apothecaries, and barber-surgeons, the latter being practitioners who performed minor surgeries and interventions. With the transfer of the Portuguese court to Rio de Janeiro, the Crown began implementing several modernising policies in the country, including the foundation of the Escola de Anatomia, Medicina e Cirurgia, headquartered in a military hospital on Morro do Castelo. In 1813, a law by Manuel Luís Alvares de Carvalho restructured the institution, creating the Academia Médico-Cirúrgica do Rio de Janeiro.

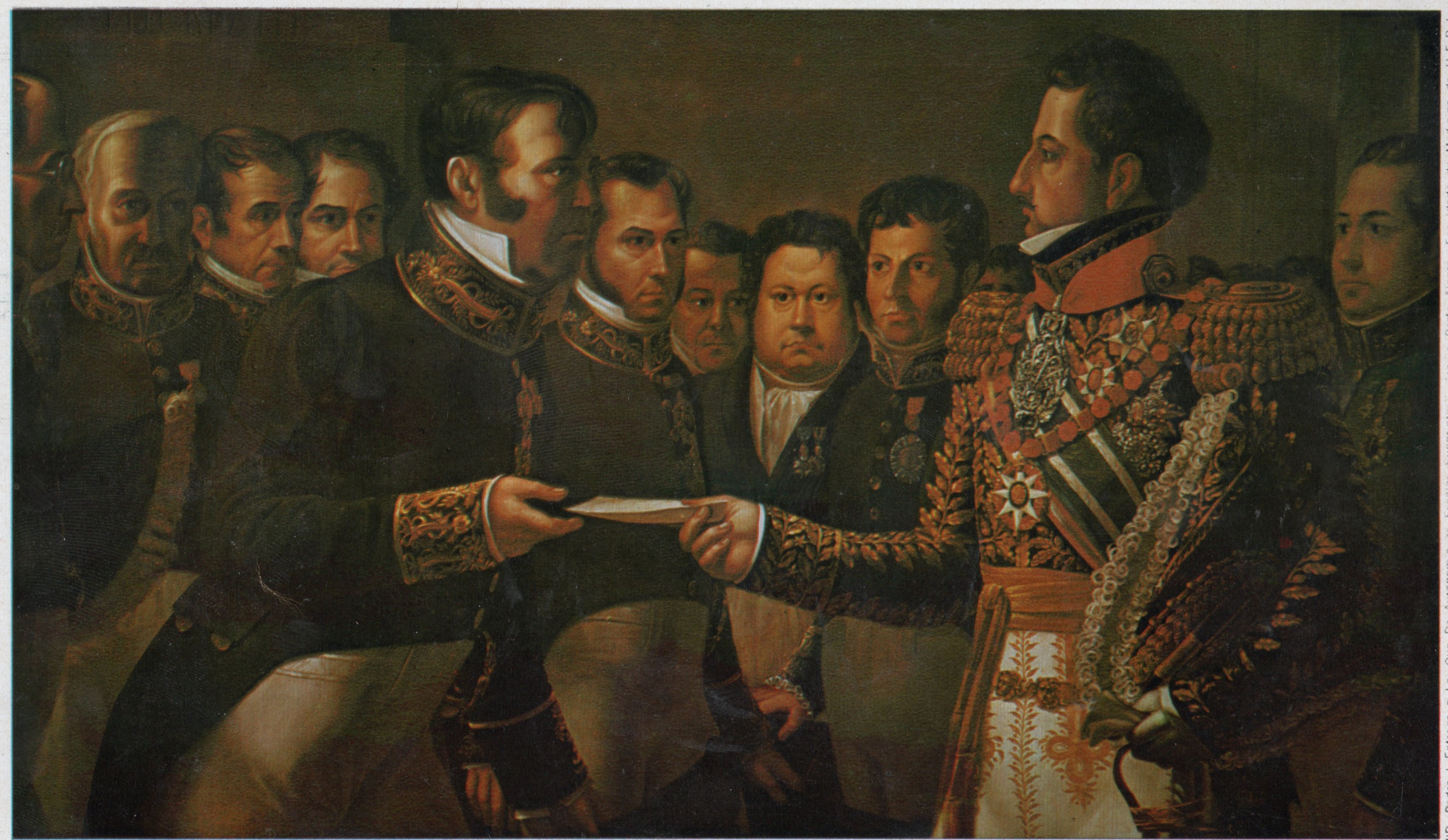
Painting by Manuel de Araújo Porto-Alegre which depicts Emperor Pedro I handing the physician and professor Vicente Navarro de Andrade, Baron of Inhomirim, then director of the Academia, the decree authorizing medical schools to confer certificates and diplomas.

An early register from around 1815 lists the Academia's students, among which were Portuguese nationals and individuals of African descent. Some of these students were licensed by the Fisicatura-mor, a colonial body responsible for regularizing medical activity.

=== Empire ===
In September 1826, Pedro I, by imperial decree, authorised the Academia to issue certificates and diplomas legally. In October 1832, during the regency period, a law declaring the Academia a Faculty was enacted. Around this time, the institution offered a French-modelled, three-axis course centered on medicine, pharmacy, and obstetrics. The minimum age for applicants was 16, and they were required to demonstrate knowledge of languages, with Latin being mandatory and French or English as an additional requirement, as well as proficiency in Logic and Philosophy, and to provide a document attesting to ''good manners and behaviour''.

In 1852, the Faculty was transferred to the building known as Recolhimento das Órfãs, in the Santa Luzia street, neighbouring the Santa Casa da Misericórdia hospital. In 1854, the so-called Bom Retiro Reform, formulated by Luís Pedreira do Couto Ferraz, Viscount of Bom Retiro, and inspired by the French university system, renovated the curricula of medical schools, introducing new subjects, including organic chemistry, and expanding teaching staffs. Though innovating, the reform attracted criticism for its inability to make practical classes available.

In 1878, Imperial Minister Leôncio de Carvalho, in line with proposals by Vicente Figueira de Sabóia, appointed a commission to elaborate reforms to public education, including a project dedicated to medical schools. Drawing influences from the German university system, this project promoted a practical-oriented curriculum, expanding classes in laboratories, instituting practical examinations as mandatory for professional certification, creating non-degree courses, and advocating for the admission of women to higher education.

=== Republic ===
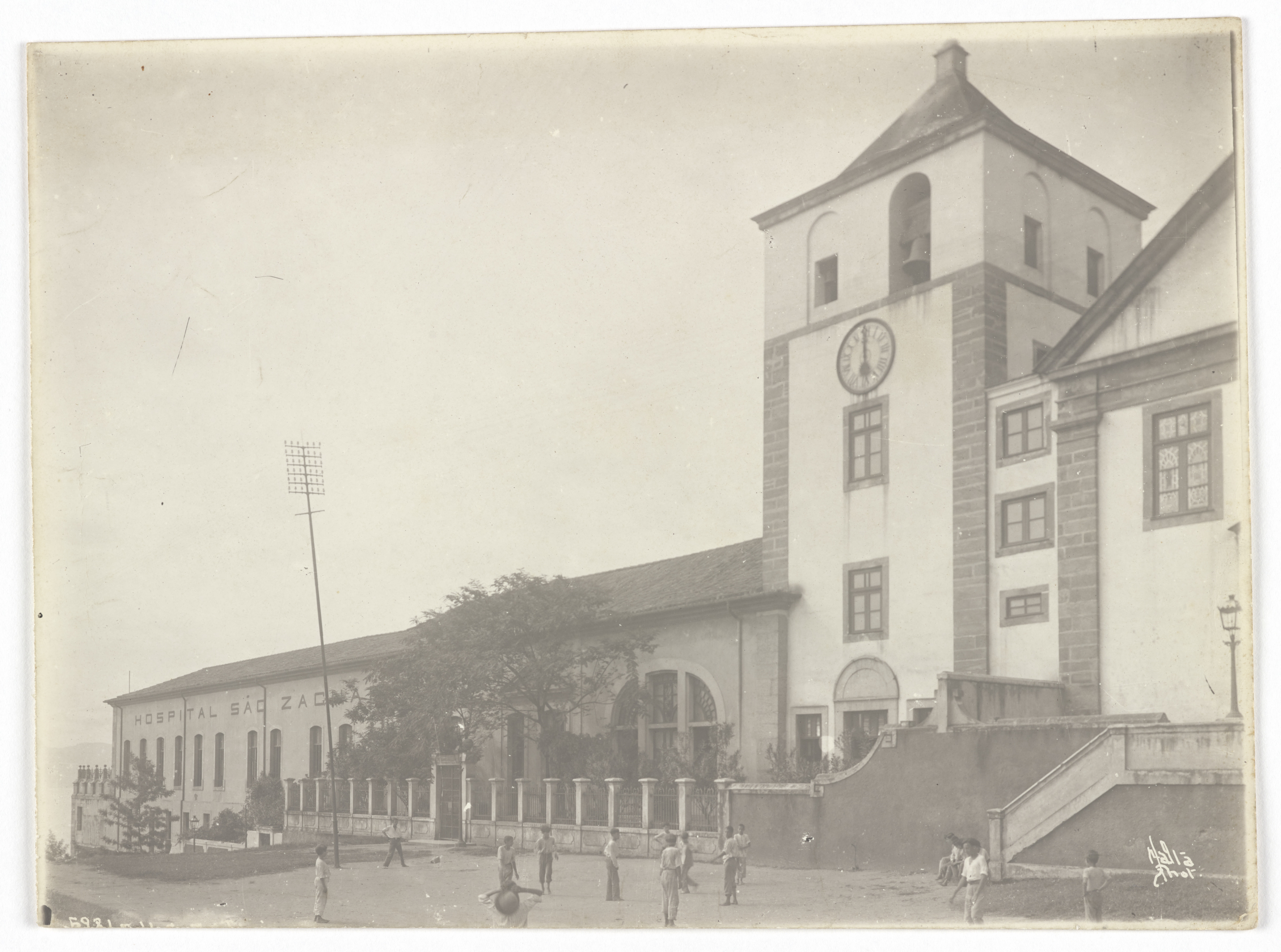
On the right, the São Zacharias hospital, formerly the Colégio dos Jesuítas, where the institution functioned in its early years. c. 1920.

By the turn of the century, the Faculty, following a trend in Brazilian higher education, was developing a stronger focus on scientific research. Around this time, many of its notable scientists emerged, such as Carlos Chagas, who, in a lone endeavour, identified Trypanosoma cruzi, described the vectors of the protozoan — known as barbeiros —, documented the symptoms of Chagas disease, mapped its epidemiological cycle, and proposed public health measures to combat it.

In 1918, it was relocated to a purpose-built facility at Praia Vermelha, in the southern zone of Rio de Janeiro, following a decades-long struggle for better conditions. On September 7, 1920, together with the Faculty of Law and the Polytechnic School, it became one of the founding-institutions of the Federal University of Rio de Janeiro. As medical specialities progressed, the Faculty began eliminating general disciplines, namely, physics, organic, mineral and general chemistry, which were moved to secondary education, to establish specialised chairs, such as urology.

In the wake of the Second World War, American influence over Brazilian education grew increasingly. The Rockefeller Foundation had a major role in directing the Faculty's orientation towards professional research, funding the scholarship of several of its professors.

During the military dictatorship, several of the Faculty's students and professors were active oppositors of the regime, holding demonstrations and protests. A notable incident, known as the Massacre of Praia Vermelha, occurred in September 1966, following a mass protest organised by the National Union of Students, which was suppressed by police officers, who drove the remaining protesters to the Faculty's facility, where they spent the night besieged. In the early hours of the 23rd, police invaded the building, violently expelling the students and leaving around 600 injured.

In 1972, it was determined that the Faculty should be moved from its traditional campus in Praia Vermelha. The next year, it was relocated to Ilha do Fundão, in the Cidade Universitária neighbourhood. In March 1978, the University Hospital of Ilha do Fundão, the first owned and operated by the Faculty, was inaugurated in the presence of president Ernesto Geisel.

== Courses ==
=== Undergraduate ===
FM-UFRJ offers three undergraduate courses: Medicine, Occupational Therapy and Speech Therapy. The latter was established in 1994, with the first cohort being formed in July 1998. From 1994 to 2020, the Faculty offered an undergraduate programme in Physiotherapy, which was transferred to a separate unit, the Faculty of Physiotherapy.

Admission to the courses occurs primarily via ENEM, an annual examination that assesses competencies across Languages (including English and Spanish), Mathematics, Natural Sciences, and Human Sciences, and includes an argumentative essay. The Medicine programme is among the most selective in the country, requiring elevated admission scores.

The Medicine programme runs for a minimum of 12 periods, or six years, and may be extended to a maximum of 18 periods, or nine years.
