= Modesto Brocos =

Spanish painter (1852–1936)

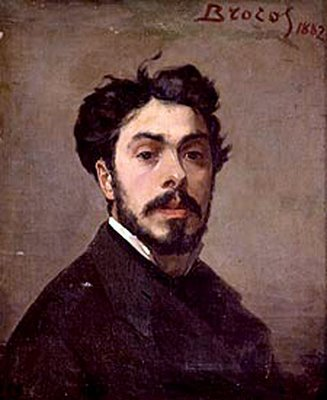
- Self-portrait (1882)
- Born: Modesto Brocos y Gómez; 9 February 1852; Santiago de Compostela, Spain
- Died: 28 October 1936 (aged 84); Rio de Janeiro, Brazil
- Known for: painting, engraving, drawing
- Movement: Realism

Modesto Brocos y Gómez (9 February 1852 – 28 November 1936) was a Spanish-born Brazilian painter and engraver.

His work covers a wide variety of styles and subjects, and he was the author of several books on painting. He is also notable for his promotion of printmaking in Brazil, especially woodcuts, of which he had been one of his adopted country's first major practitioners during his time at O Mequetrefe.

== Biography ==
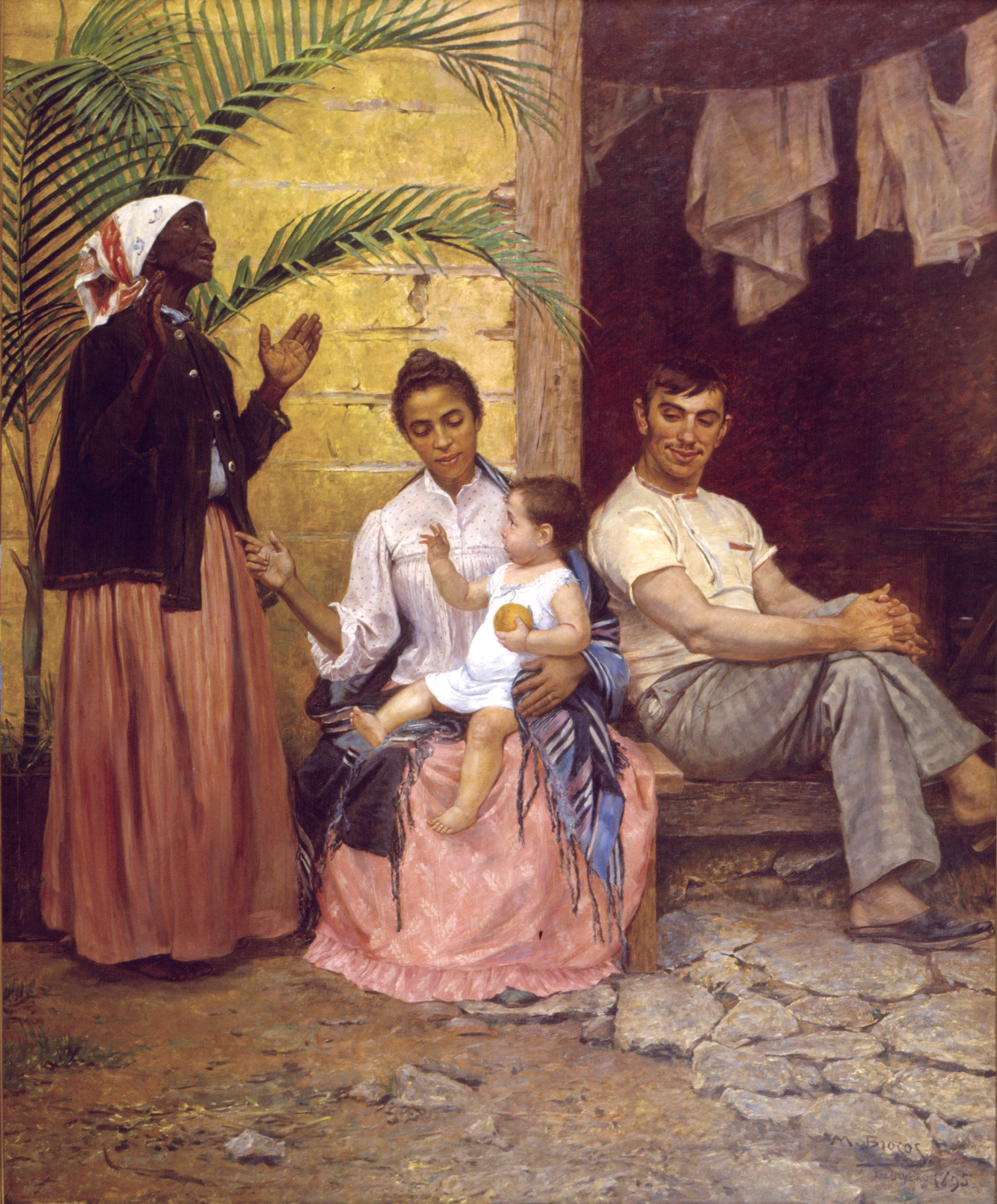
A Redenção de Cam (Ham's Redemption, 1895), a controversial commentary on "blanqueamiento", the progressive whitening of Brazil's population through intermarriage

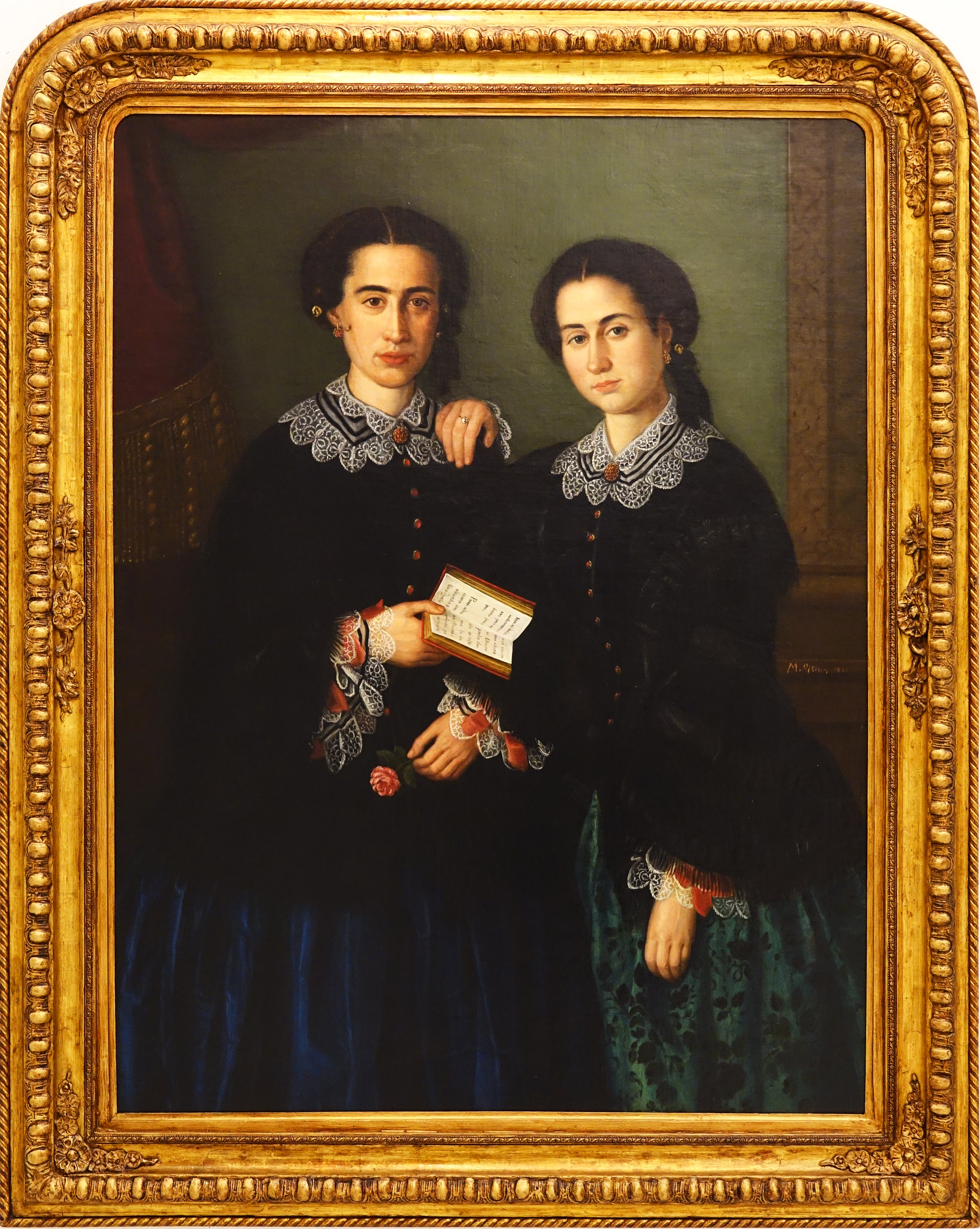
Portrait of Two Girls

He was born in Santiago de Compostela, Galicia, Spain, into a humble family with artistic inclinations. His grandfather and father were writers and his brother was the sculptor Isidoro Brocos, who was also his first teacher at the Academia de Belas Artes in A Coruña. At the age of eighteen, after completing his studies, he moved to Argentina, but was not successful there. Two years later, he moved to Brazil, where he eventually found work in Rio de Janeiro illustrating the mildly satirical weekly republican magazine O Mequetrefe (a term that describes a nosy person who is a bit of a scamp). This income enabled him to enter the Academia Imperial de Belas Artes, where he studied under Victor Meirelles and João Zeferino da Costa.

After two years there, he moved to Paris, enrolled at the École des Beaux-Arts and took lessons from Henri Lehmann. Dissatisfied with what he was being taught, he moved on to Madrid, where he studied briefly at the Real Academia de Bellas Artes de San Fernando), then in 1883 to Rome, after receiving a fellowship from the government of A Coruña. Once there, he worked with his countryman, Francisco Pradilla and spent five years at the Accademia Chigi.

By 1890, he was exhibiting at the Salon and felt that his education was complete, so he accepted an invitation to teach at the Escola Nacional de Belas Artes (successor to the Imperial Academy) from its director, Rodolfo Bernardelli. He was able to become a naturalized citizen with little difficulty, and was appointed Professor of Figurative Drawing there, a position he held for the rest of his life, with a brief leave of absence to create some decorations for the Santiago de Compostela Cathedral.

Brocos died in Rio de Janeiro on 28 November 1936.
