= Academia Nacional de Medicina =

Brazilian non-governmental organization

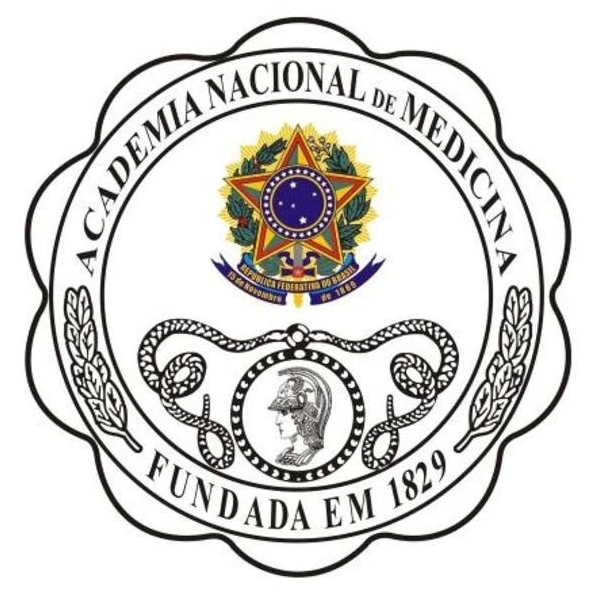
- Formation: June 30, 1829
- Type: National academy of medicine
- Headquarters: Rio de Janeiro, Brazil

The Academia Nacional de Medicina (ANM) is the Brazilian national academy of medicine.

The academy was founded during the Brazilian imperial period on 30 June 1829, under the name of Sociedade de Medicina do Rio de Janeiro. On 8 May 1835, it received a charter from the imperial regency to become the Imperial Academy of Medicine. After the proclamation of the First Brazilian Republic, its name was changed to its current name.

Its first president was Joaquim Cândido Soares de Meirelles.
