= Social apartheid in Brazil =

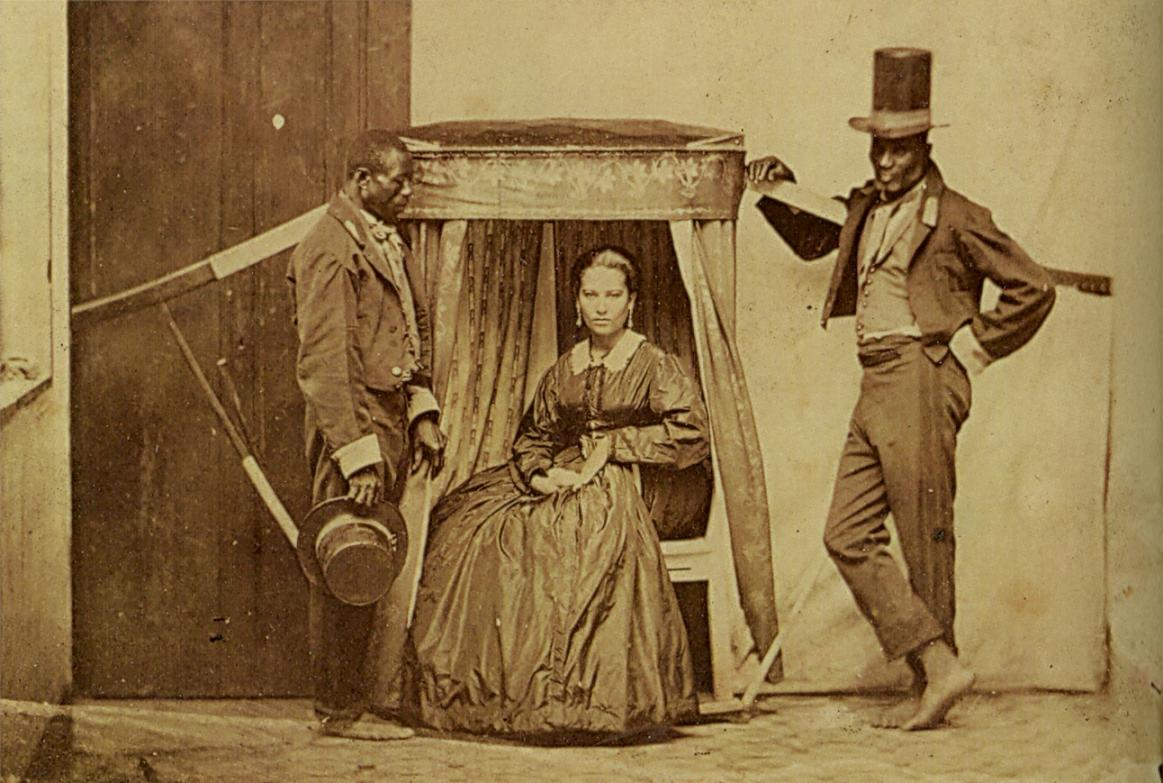
19th-century picture of a white woman being carried by slaves in her litter

– States with majority White population. – States with majority Pardo (Multiracial) population.

The term social apartheid has been used to describe various aspects of economic inequality in Brazil, drawing a parallel with the legally enforced separation of white and black people in South African society for several decades during the 20th-century apartheid regime.

== Origins ==
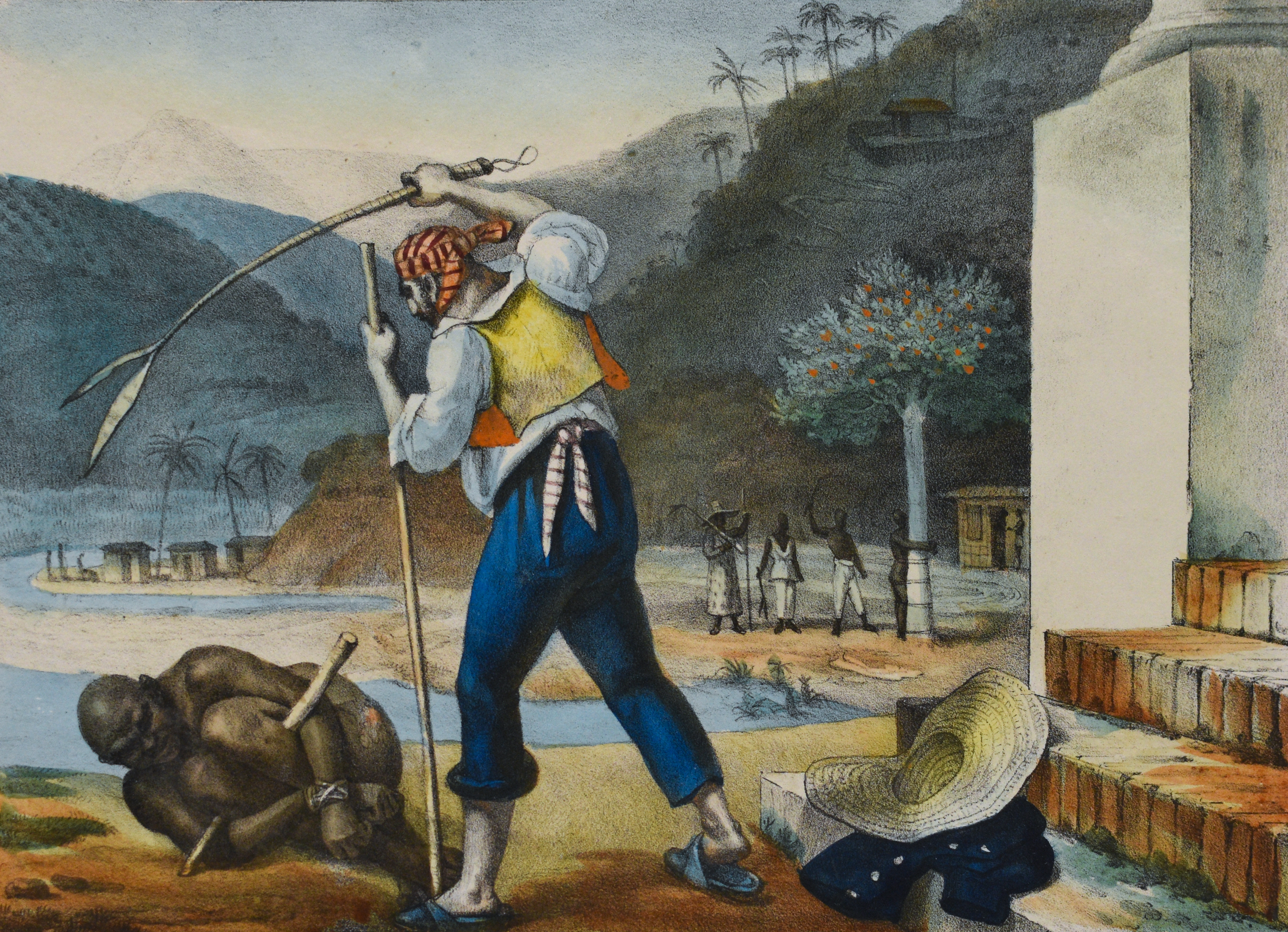
Slavery in Brazil.

According to Maria Helena Moreira Alves, early twentieth century inequalities between rich and poor in Brazil were exacerbated by the differing treatment of urban migrants during and following the Great Depression. Internal migrants, who were mainly descended from Amerindians or African slaves, were given no government assistance or training in adapting to large urban centers. They became concentrated in a kind of "social apartheid", living in slums and taking menial and unpleasant jobs shunned by whites. By contrast, European, Arab, and Japanese immigrants, who tended to be better educated, were directly assisted by a number of government programs, including some sponsored by their national governments, as well as other benefits.

== Income inequality ==
Income disparity is a major source of social inequality in Brazil. In 2001, Brazil had a relatively high Gini coefficient of 0.59 for income disparity, meaning that the disparity between the incomes of any two randomly selected Brazilians was nearly 1.2 times the average. The World Bank estimates that the top 20% of the richest Brazilians have roughly 33 times the income share of the poorest 20%.

The causes of Brazil's income disparity are linked to inequitable distribution of public resources, disadvantages in education, and a wage gap. Public spending is regressive overall; while social programs are largely progressive, other spending, such as pensions for public employees, constitutes a larger share of total spending, and is weighted toward individuals with higher incomes. According to the World Bank, this accounts for around 39% of income inequality. Access to education is highly unequal and weighted toward privileged groups, resulting in a gap in labor skills that is substantially greater than other countries in the Americas such as Mexico, Colombia, and the United States. The World Bank estimates that this accounts for about 29% of total inequality. Finally, there is a considerable and increasing wage gap between jobs requiring higher and lower skill levels. The world bank attributes 32% of inequality to the wage gap.

Gender, skin color, and social standing are significant factors in income disparity, with women and Brazilians with African ancestry earning substantially less than males and white Brazilians, due to disadvantages in education and wages. Black Brazilians have levels of educational attainment that is two thirds the level of whites, which limits their access to higher paying jobs. Women earn 29% less than men, despite women having an average of one year more education.

== Racial and class inequality ==
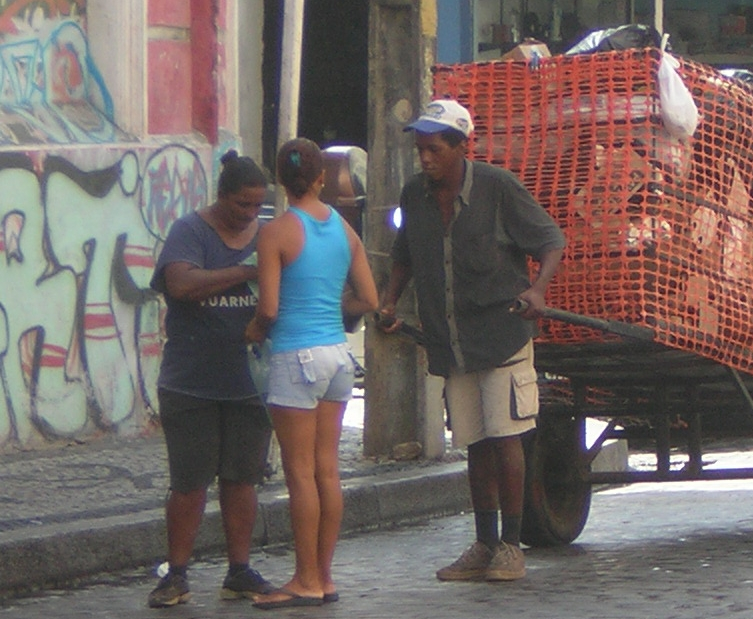
The majority of the poor are blacks and pardos in Brazil.

Some believe that these parallels between South Africa during the apartheid era and modern-day Brazil are associated with the country's history of slavery and associated racial castes, as inequities in the economic and social status particularly affect Afro-Brazilians in comparison to other groups. According to São Paulo Congressman Aloizio Mercadante, a member of Brazil's leftist Workers' Party (PT), "Just as South Africa had racial apartheid, Brazil has social apartheid." Journalist Kevin G. Hall wrote in 2002 that Afro-Brazilians trail White Brazilians in almost all social indicators, including income and education. Those living in cities are far more likely to be abused or killed by police, or incarcerated than are members of other groups.

Brazil's social situation has negative effects on educational opportunities for the disadvantaged. Critics note that the classes are mostly separated from any interaction other than service: the wealthy live in walled-off gated communities, and the disadvantaged classes do not interact at all with the wealthy "except in domestic service and on the shop floor".

According to France Winddance Twine, the separation by class and race extends into what she terms "spatial apartheid", where upper-class residents and guests, presumed to be white, enter apartments buildings and hotels through the main entrance, while lower-class domestics and service providers enter at the side or rear.

Civil rights activist Carlos Verissimo writes that Brazil is a racist state, and that the inequities of race and class are often inter-related. Michael Löwy states that the "social apartheid" is manifested in the gated communities, a "social discrimination which also has an implicit racial dimension where the great majority of the poor are black or half caste." Despite Brazil's retreat from military rule and return to democracy in 1988, social apartheid has increased.

== Effects on street youth ==
Social apartheid is tied to the exclusion of poor youth (particularly street youth) from Brazilian society. Some political theorists assert the role of the police in keeping the inhabitants of Brazil's many favelas from encroaching on the lives of middle- and upper-class Brazilians is key to maintaining this state of apartheid.

Professors of anthropology Nancy Scheper-Hughes and Daniel Hoffman describe this discrimination against and exclusion of slum and street children as "Brazilian apartheid", and state that "[t]he hidden and disallowed part of the discourse on Brazil's street children is that the term is, in fact, color coded in 'race-blind' Brazil, where most street kids are 'black'." They write that in order to protect themselves, poor children often carry weapons, and that, as a result, "[t]he cost of maintaining this form of apartheid is high: an urban public sphere that is unsafe for any child."

Tobias Hecht writes that rich Brazilians see the often violent street children as a threat, so they try to marginalize them socially and keep them and the poverty they represent hidden from lives of the wealthy elite. According to Hecht, the persistent presence of these children "embod[ies] the failure of an unacknowledged social apartheid to keep the poor out of view."

== Economic effects ==
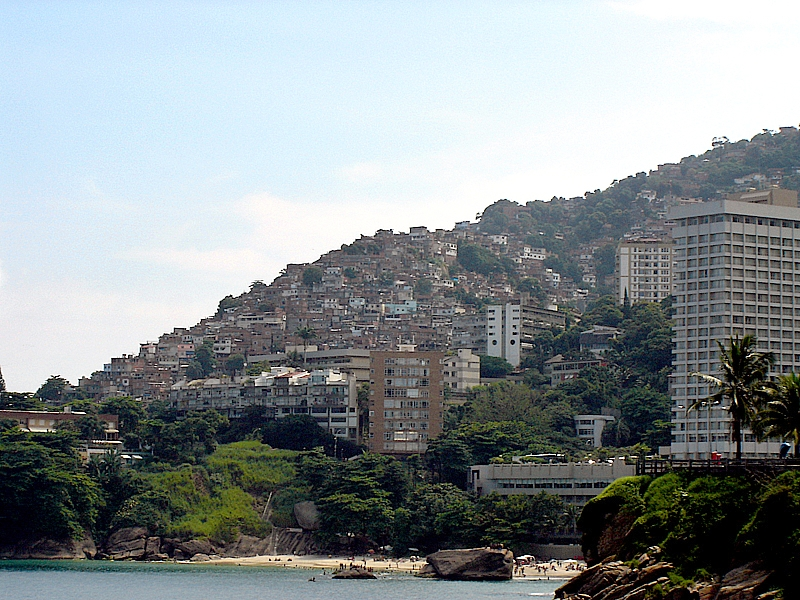
Favela in Rio de Janeiro.

Social apartheid is a common theme in studies of the implications of Brazil's huge income disparities. The term "social apartheid" (and the inequities associated with it) is recognized as a serious issue even by Brazil's elites, who benefit from it:

Despite decades of impressive economic growth, the striking social inequities remain. In a recent survey of 1,500 of the most influential members of Brazil's political and economic elite, close to 90 percent believed that Brazil had achieved economic success and social failure. Close to half viewed the enormous inequities as a form of "social apartheid".

Cristovam Buarque, Democratic Labour Party senator for the Federal District, says that "Brazil is a divided country, home to the greatest income concentration in the world and to a model of apartation, Brazilian social apartheid." He writes that instead of "a spectrum of inequality", there is now "a break between the included and the excluded. In place of inequality, a separation, a social apartheid, has arisen". He argues that society is threatened by "a gap between the rich and poor so big that in every country there will be separate growth, along the lines of South Africa under apartheid", and that while this is happening globally, "Brazil is its best example".

== Race and crime ==
As the overall homicide rate registered in Brazil has been rising, the number of homicides per 100,000 afro and pardo brazilians also increased from 32.42 in 2006 to 43.15 in 2017, whereas the number of homicides per 100,000 for white and asian brazilians has decreased from 17.12 in 2006 to 15.97 recorded in 2017.

According to research, the possibility of being black homicide victims in Brazil is even greater in groups with similar educational and socioeconomic characteristics. The chance of a black teenager murdered is 3.7 times higher compared with whites.

The survey also shows that blacks are bigger victims of assault by police. The National Victimization Survey shows that in 2009, 6.5% of blacks who had suffered an aggression as aggressors police or private security guards (who are often working in the police off duty), compared with 3.7% of whites.

According to Daniel Cerqueira, more than 60,000 people are murdered every year in the country and there is a strong bias of color and social status in these deaths: "In proportion black death rate is 135% higher than non-blacks. While the homicide rate for blacks is 36.5 per 100 000 inhabitants, in the case of whites, the ratio is 15.5 per 100 000 inhabitants."

== Political effects ==
Brazilian president Luiz Inácio Lula da Silva (2003–2010) was quoted in 2002 by Mark Weisbrot in The Nation as saying he was "fighting to bring the poor of Brazil out of economic apartheid". His loss in the presidential election of 1994 to Fernando Henrique Cardoso (1995–2002) has been attributed in part to the fear Lula aroused in the middle class by his "denunciations of the social apartheid which permeated Brazilian society."

== See also ==
- Racism in Brazil
- Racial democracy
- Social issues in Brazil
- Demographics of Brazil
- Race and ethnicity in Brazil
- Racial whitening
