= Race and ethnicity in Brazil =

Brazilian society is made up of a confluence of people of Indigenous, Portuguese, and African descent. Other major significant groups include Italians, Spaniards, Germans, Lebanese, Eastern Europeans, and Japanese.

Latin Europe accounted for four-fifths of the arrivals (2.25 million Portuguese, 1.5 million Italians, and 700,000 Spaniards).

Brazil has seen greater racial equality over time. According to a recent review study, "There has been major, albeit uneven, progress in these terms since slavery, which has unfortunately not wholly translated into equality of income: only in 2011 did the black-to-white income ratio eclipse its 1960 level, although it appears to be at an all-time high. Education and migration were important factors in closing the gap, whereas school quality and discrimination may explain its persistence."

== Historical background ==
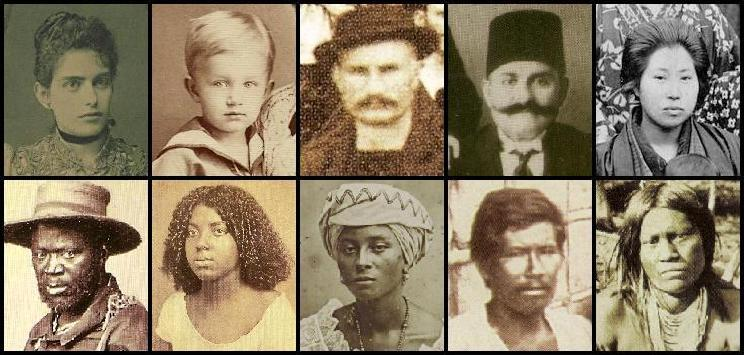
The Brazilian people are multi-ethnic. First row: White (Portuguese, German, Italian, Arab respectively) and Japanese Brazilians. Second row: Black, Pardo (cafuzo, mulato and caboclo, respectively) and Native Brazilians.

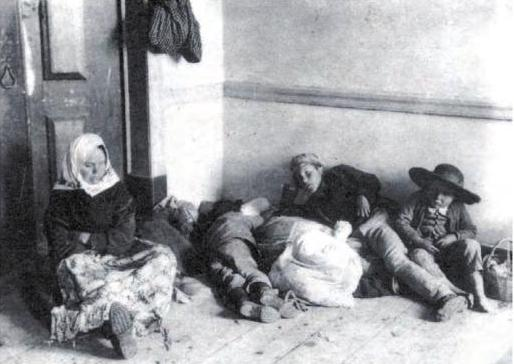
Portuguese immigrants arriving in Rio de Janeiro

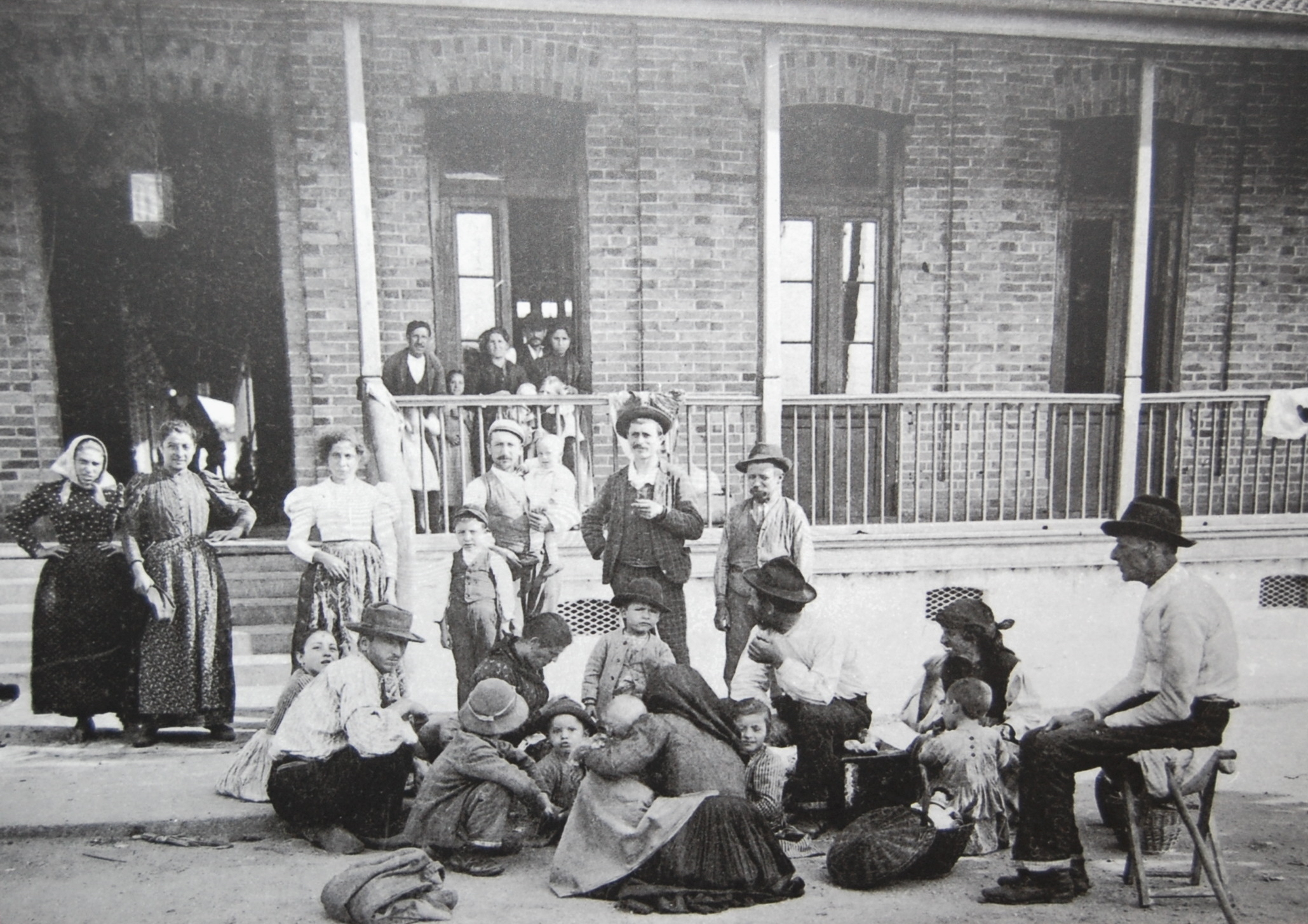
European immigrants arriving in São Paulo

The Brazilian population was formed by the influx of Portuguese settlers and African slaves, mostly Bantu and West African populations (such as the Yoruba, Ewe, and Fanti-Ashanti), into a territory inhabited by various indigenous South American tribal populations, mainly Tupi, Guarani and Ge.

In the late 19th and early 20th centuries, in what is known as Great Immigration, new groups arrived, mainly of Japanese, Italian, Lebanese, German, Spanish, and Portuguese origin, but also from Asia, Latin America, Southern and Eastern Europe, and Africa.

When the Portuguese reached what is now called Brazil in 1500, its native population was probably composed of about 2.5 million Amerindians. Up to 1532, the Portuguese made no real effort to colonise the land, limiting to the establishment of feitorias (factories) to organise the trade of brazilwood.

When it became clear that this policy would result in the land being taken by other European powers, namely the French and Dutch, the Portuguese Crown decided to effectively occupy the territory by fostering agricultural activities, especially sugarcane. This resulted in the growth of the population of Portuguese origin, but also in the introduction of the African slave trade in Brazil.

During the colonial period, Portugal restricted the influx of other Europeans to Brazil. As a consequence, Portuguese settlers and their descendants constituted the overwhelming majority of the white population in colonial Brazil.

However, in Southern Brazilian areas disputed between the Portuguese and Spanish crowns, genetic studies suggest a different demographic profile. Research indicates that the predominant genomic ancestry of Brazilian Gaúchos (the inhabitants of the Pampas) may be Spanish rather than Portuguese.

A smaller number of Dutch settlers remained in the Northeast after Portugal retook Dutch Brazil and have contributed to the demographic composition of Northeastern Brazil. Following the country's independence in 1822, immigration to Brazil was still mainly Portuguese, although a significant number of German immigrants had settled in the Southern region.

=== European, Arab and East Asian immigration ===
Combined with the European demographic crisis, this resulted in the immigration of about 5 million people, mostly European peasants, in the last quarter of the 19th century and first half of the 20th. The majority of these immigrants were either Portuguese or Italian (about 2,250,000 Portuguese, and 1,500,000 Italians), though significant numbers of Spaniards (690,000, possibly including Portuguese emigrating from Vigo on false passports), Germans (250,000), Japanese (170,000), Middle Easterns (100,000, mostly people from what are now Syria and Lebanon), and Eastern Europeans (mostly Poles and Ukrainians) also immigrated.

There are few reliable statistics on the Brazilian population before the 1872 census. In it, the Brazilian population is recorded to be made of:

- 3,787,289 Whites (European mainly)
- 4,188,737 Mixed-race (Pardo)
- 1,954,452 Blacks (African)

These figures do not yet reflect the influx of the five million immigrants mentioned above, since up to 1872 only about 270,000 immigrants had arrived in Brazil. According to Judicael Clevelário's calculations, the total population of immigrant origin in 1872 would be of about 240,000 people; consequently, the total White population of non-immigrant origin for that year would be of about 3,540,000 at least.

In the 2010 census, Whites were the largest single group, but not the majority. In 2010, the ethnic backgrounds of Brazilians were:

- 91,051,646 Whites (European mainly)
- 82,277,333 Mixed-race (Pardo)
- 14,517,961 Blacks (African)
- 2,084,288 East Asians (Japanese mainly)
- 817,963 Indigenous (Native)

Origin	Period							
Origin	1830–1855	1856–1883	1884–1893	1894–1903	1904–1913	1914–1923	1924–1933	1933–2025
Portuguese	16,737	116,000	170,621	155,542	384,672	201,252	233,650	500,000
Italians	—	100,000	510,533	537,784	196,521	86,320	70,177	
Spaniards	—	—	113,116	102,142	224,672	94,779	52,405	
Germans	2,008	30,000	22,778	6,698	33,859	29,339	61,723	
Japanese	—	—	—	—	11,868	20,398	110,191	
Levantines	—	—	96	7,124	45,803	20,400	20,400	
Others	—	—	66,524	42,820	109,222	51,493	164,586	

=== African resistance in the 1800s ===
In the 1880s Brazil remained one of the few nations to still practice the institution of slavery. Brazil accounted for 40% of the trans-Atlantic slave trade between the 16th and late 19th centuries. From early on during the trade there has been African resistance to slavery.

==== Islam of Bahia & Malê revolt ====
Early signs of resistance in Brazil can be found in the 1835 Malê revolt led by African slaves in the city of Salvador de Bahia. It was spearheaded by a group of enslaved African Muslims and freedmen inspired by Muslim teachings that acted against proslavery efforts and demanded that the African people be treated with respect. It is claimed that non-Muslims were also targeted.

The enslaved Africans who resisted were often mutilated, beaten to death, hung or thrown overboard. Those who managed to escape during the 1800s developed maroon communities known as Quilombolas that gave formerly enslaved Africans and their descendants a refuge after escaping slavery. The largest of these communities in Brazil in the 17th century was Quilombolas dos Palomares at 30.000 inhabitants, with more being formed as time passed.

=== Marronage ===
Marronage refers to the resistance and escape from slavery in Brazil around the mid-1880s. For many African descendants in Brazil, this was a statement that displayed their pride towards the accomplishment of liberation, with the establishment of Quilombolas serving as a decision to as live as free men under their post-colonial society.

When looking at uprisings the focus of African resistance and rebellion to slavery Antônio Bento organized raids with coffee plantations aimed at coffee plantations in Brazil. Production of sugar and coffee were a vital part of Brazil's economy, and this demand required nonstop sunup to sundown labor that due to growth in production Brazilian and Portuguese farmers imposed this task upon the Africans.

== Abolition of slavery (1888) ==
There seems to be no easy explanation of why slaves were not employed as wage workers at the abolition of slavery. One possibility is the influence of race-based ideas from the second half of the 19th and early 20th centuries, which were based on theories of White superiority. On the other hand, Brazilian latifundiaries had been using slave manpower for centuries, with no complaints about the quality of this workforce, and there were not important changes in Brazilian economy or work processes that could justify such sudden preoccupation with the "race" of the labourers. Their embracing of those new identitarian ideas, moreover, proved quite flexible, even opportunist: with the slowdown of Italian immigration since 1902 and the Prinetti Decree, Japanese immigration started in 1908, with any qualms about their typically non-European origins being quickly forgotten.

An important, and usually ignored, part of this equation was the political situation in Brazil, during the final crisis of slavery. According to Petrônio Domingues, by 1887 the slave struggles pointed to a real possibility of widespread insurrection. On October 23, in São Paulo, for instance, there were violent confrontations between the police and rioting Blacks, who chanted "long live freedom" and "death to the slaveowners". The president of the province, Rodrigues Alves, reported the situation as following:

The massive flight of slaves from several fazendas threatens, in some places in the province, public order, alarming the proprietaries and the productive classes.

Uprisings erupted in Itu, Campinas, Indaiatuba, Amparo, Piracicaba and Capivari; ten thousand fugitive slaves grouped in Santos. Fights were happening in daylight, guns were spotted among the fugitives, who, instead of hiding from police, seemed ready to engage in confrontation.

It was as a response to such events that, on May 13, 1888, slavery was abolished, as a means to restore order and the control of the ruling class, in a situation in which the slave system was almost completely disorganised.

As an abolitionist newspaper, O Rebate, put it, ten years later,

Hadn't the slaves fled massively from the plantations, rebelling against the masters ... Hadn't they, in more than 20,000, gone to the famous quilombo of Jabaquara (out of Santos, itself a center of abolitionist agitation), and maybe they would today be still slaves ... Slavery ended because slaves no longer wanted to be slaves, because slaves rebelled against their masters and against the law that enslaved them ... The law of 13 May was nothing more than the legal recognition – so that public authority wasn't discredited – of an act that had already been accomplished by the mass revolt of slaves.

Another factor, also usually neglected, is the fact that, regardless of the racial notions of the Brazilian elite, European populations were emigrating in great numbers – to the United States, to Argentina, to Uruguay – which African populations certainly were not doing, at that time. In this respect, what was new in "immigration to Brazil" was not the "immigration", but the "to Brazil" part. As Wilson do Nascimento Barbosa puts it,

The collapse of slavery was the economic result of three conjugated movements: a) the end of the first industrial revolution (1760–1840) and the beginning of the so-called second industrial revolution (1880–1920); b) the lowering of the reproduction costs of the White man in Europe (1760–1860), due to the sanitary and pharmacological impact of the first industrial revolution; c) the rising costs of African Black slaves, due to the increasing reproduction costs of Black men in Africa.

== Racial and ethnic theories ==
European and Levantine countries from where there was significant emigration to Brazil, 1820 to 1980: 1st 2nd 3rd 4th

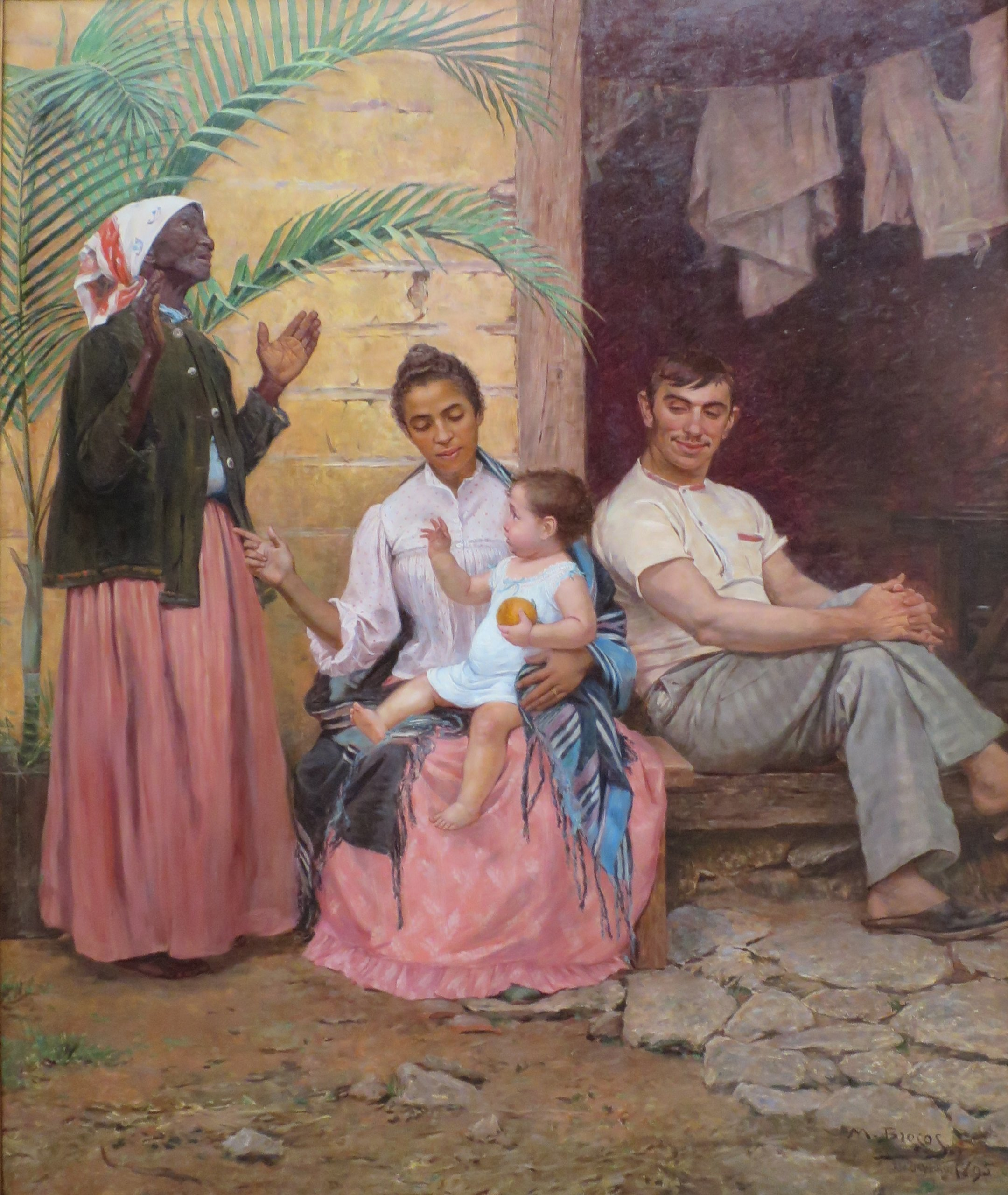
A Redenção de Cam (Redemption of Ham), Modesto Brocos, 1895, Museu Nacional de Belas Artes. The painting depicts a black grandmother, mulatta mother, white father and their quadroon child, hence three generations of hypergamy through racial whitening.

=== Immigration discussion and policy in the 19th century ===
In Brazil, particularly in São Paulo, the dominant idea was that national workers were unable to develop the country, and that only foreign workers would be able to work in a regime of "free" (i.e., wage) labour. The goal was to "whiten" Brazil through new immigrants and through future genetic mixing in which former slaves would disappear by becoming "Whiter."

In 1878, ten years before the abolition of slavery, Rio de Janeiro hosted the Congresso Agrícola (Agricultural Congress) and that meeting reflected what the Brazilian elite (especially coffee planters) expected from their future workers. Although national workers were an option to some of the participants, especially to those not from São Paulo, most of them, under the lead of coffee planters from São Paulo, agreed that only immigration would be good to Brazil, and, moreover, European immigration. The Congresso Agrícola showed that the elite was convinced that Europeans were racially and culturally superior to other races.

Although discussions were situated in a theoretical field, immigrants arrived and colonies were founded through all this period (the rule of Pedro II), especially from 1850 on, particularly in the Southeast and Southern Brazil. These discussions culminated in the Decree 528 in 1890, signed by Brazil's first President Deodoro da Fonseca, which opened the national harbors to immigration except for Africans and Asians. This decree remained valid until October 5, 1892, when, due to pressures of coffee planters interested in cheap manpower, it was overturned by Law 97, which allowed the entry of Japanese immigrants to work on the coffee plantations, because, until that moment, the Brazilian ports could receive Whites only, who came mainly from Europe and the Middle East.

As a result of those discussions and policies, Brazil experienced immigration mostly from countries such as Portugal, Italy, Spain, Germany, France, Poland, Russia, Ukraine, etc., during the end of the empire and the beginning of the republic period (late 19th and early 20th centuries). Later immigration, from 1908 on, was not so much influenced by that race discussions and Brazil attracted, besides Europeans, more immigrants from Lebanon, Syria and Japan, for example.

=== Oliveira Vianna and the ideology of "Whitening" ===
Racial whitening, or "whitening" (branqueamento), is an ideology that was widely accepted in Brazil between 1889 and 1914, as the solution to the "Negro problem." The Brazilian government, as was commonplace at that time, endorsed positions expressed by Brazilian intellectuals and scientists. An example is a text, written by Oliveira Vianna, that was issued as introductory material to 1920 Census results. Many pages of Vianna's work were dedicated to the discussion of a "pure race" of white Brazilians. According to the text, written by Oliveira Vianna, the first Portuguese colonists who came to Brazil were part of the blond Germanic nobility that ruled Portugal, while the dark-haired "poor" Portuguese only came to Brazil later, in the 17th and especially the 18th century.

According to Oliveira Vianna, the blond Portuguese of Germanic origin were "restless and migratory", and that is why they emigrated to Brazil. On the other hand, the Portuguese of darker complexions were of Celtic or Iberian origin and came when the Portuguese settlement in Brazil was already well established, because, according to him, "The peninsular brachyoids, of Celtic race, or the dolicoides, of Iberian race, of sedentary habits and peaceful nature, did not have, of course, that mobility nor that bellicosity nor that spirit of adventure and conquest."

The text reported the different levels of intelligence found among blacks and highlights the existence of "lazy blacks" (Gêgis and Angolans) or "laborious blacks" (Timinins, Minas, Dahomeyanos) and also the existence of "peaceful and obedient blacks" and of "rebels and fierce" ones. Vianna also compares the "morality" and intellectual level found among blacks and reports that Gêgis, Krumanos and Cabindas revealed the "mental inferiority, typical from the lowest types of the black race."

=== Gilberto Freyre's work ===
In 1933, Brazilian anthropologist Gilberto Freyre published his famous book Casa-Grande & Senzala (The Masters and the Slaves). The book appeared at a moment when there was a widespread belief among social scientists that some races were superior to other ones, and in the same period when the Nazi Party in Germany was on the rise. Freyre's work was very important to change the mentality, especially of the white Brazilian elite, who considered the Brazilian people as "inferior" because of their African and Amerindian ancestry. In this book, Freyre argued against the idea that Brazil would have an "inferior race" because of the race-mixing.

Then, he pointed the positive elements that permeate the Brazilian cultural formation because of genetic mixing (especially between Portuguese, Amerindians and Blacks). Freyre's book has changed the mentality in Brazil, and the mixing of races, then, became a reason to be a national pride. However, Freyre's book created the Brazilian myth of the Racial democracy, which held that Brazil was a "post-racial" country without identitarianism or desire to preserve one's European ancestry. This theory was later challenged by several anthropologists who claim that, despite the race-mixing, the white Brazilian population still occupies the top of the Brazilian society, while Blacks, Indians and mixed-race people are largely found in the poor population.

== Gilberto Freyre on the criticisms that he received ==
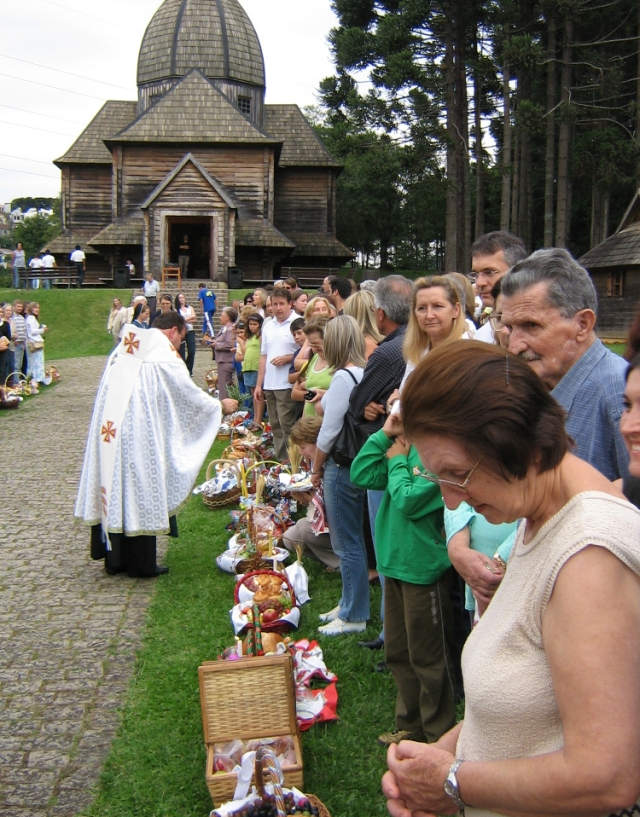
Ukrainian immigrants in Curitiba, celebrating the Ukrainian Easter

The life of Gilberto Freyre, after he published Casa-Grande & Senzala, became an eternal source of explanation. He repeated several times that he did not create the myth of a racial democracy and that the fact that his books recognized the intense mixing between "races" in Brazil did not mean a lack of prejudice or discrimination.

He pointed out that many people have claimed the United States to have been an "exemplary democracy" whereas slavery and racial segregation were present throughout most of the history of the United States.

"The interpretation of those who want to place me among the sociologists or anthropologists who said prejudice of race among the Portuguese or the Brazilians never existed is extreme. What I have always suggested is that such prejudice is minimal ... when compared to that which is still in place elsewhere, where laws still regulate relations between Europeans and other groups".

"It is not that racial prejudice or social prejudice related to complexion are absent in Brazil. They exist. But no one here would have thought of "white-only" Churches. No one in Brazil would have thought of laws against interracial marriage ... Fraternal spirit is stronger among Brazilians than racial prejudice, colour, class or religion. It is true that equality has not been reached since the end of slavery ...

There was racial prejudice among plantation owners, there was social distance between the masters and the slaves, between whites and blacks ... But few wealthy Brazilians were as concerned with racial purity as were the majority of Anglo-Americans in the Old South."

== Racial legislation ==
During the 19th century, there were some instances of legally formalized racism. In 1809, when a provincial militia was formed in Rio Grande do Sul, it was established that the members should be "White", this being defined as "those whose great-grandparents were not Black, and whose parents were free-born".

On July 28, 1921, representatives Andrade Bezerra and Cincinato Braga proposed a law whose Article 1 provided: "It is prohibited in Brazil immigration of individuals from the black race." On October 22, 1923, representative Fidélis Reis produced another project of law on the entry of immigrants, whose fifth article was as follows: 'It is prohibited the entry of settlers from the black race in Brazil and, to Asians, it will be allowed each year, a number equal to 5% of those existing in the country.(...)'. Both bills were decried as identitarian and rejected by the Brazilian Congress.

In 1945, the Brazilian government issued a decree favoring the entrance of European immigrants in the country: "In the admission of immigrants, the need to preserve and develop, in the ethnic composition of the population, the more convenient features of their European ancestry shall be considered".

== Genetic mixing between ancestral groups ==
The degree of genetic mixing between ancestral groups in Brazil has been very high, as Brazil was colonized by male Portuguese adventurers who tended to procreate with Amerindian and African women. This made possible a myth of "racial democracy" that tends to obscure a widespread discrimination connected to certain aspects of physical appearance: aspects related to the concept of cor ("colour"), used in a way that is roughly equivalent to the English term "race" but based on a combination of skin colour, hair type, shape of nose and lips, and even clearly cultural phenomena such as neighborhood of residence, linguistic habits and class. It is possible for siblings to belong to different "colour" categories. So a "White" Brazilian may be understood as a person perceived and socially accepted as "White", and thus "white" potentially regardless of ancestry or sometimes even immediate family. Nonetheless, and in conjunction with recent emphases on genetic testing, a variety of social movements, government programs, and academic and popular initiatives have led to an increasing emphasis on historicity and ancestry in racial identification in Brazil and this has tended to counteract what many commentators have long sought to characterize—perhaps incorrectly, perhaps correctly, as a Brazilian racial mutability or malleability.

The patterns of racialized "assortative mating" in Brazil are complex. The genome of the first generation offspring of European fathers and African mothers was 50% European and 50% African, but the distribution of the genes that affect visible features (skin colour, hair type, lip shape, nose shape) was random. Those of the second generation with features considered closer to a "White" stereotype would have tended to procreate with others like themselves, while those considered closer to "Black" would also have tended to procreate among themselves; in the long term producing "White" and "Black" groups with surprisingly similar proportions of European and African ancestry.

== IBGE's racial categories ==
Racial groups in Brazil (2022 census)
1. Pardos (mixed) (45.3%)
2. Whites (43.5%)
3. Blacks (10.2%)
4. Indigenous (0.60%)
5. East Asians (0.42%)

The Brazilian Institute of Geography and Statistics (IBGE), which has conducted censuses in Brazil since 1940, racially classifies the Brazilian population in five categories: Branco (White), "Pardo" (Multiracial), Preto (Black), Amarelo/Asiático (Yellow/Asian), and Indígena (Indigenous). As in international practice, individuals are asked to self identify within these categories.

The following are the results for the different Brazilian censuses, since 1872:

Brazilian Population, by Race, from 1872 to 2022^{1} (Census Data)
Race or Color	Brancos ("whites")	Pardos ("mixed")	Pretos ("blacks")	Caboclos ("indigenous"/"mestizo")	Amarelos ("yellow"/"East Asian")	Indigenous	Undeclared	Total
1872^{2}	3,787,289	3,801,782	1,954,452	386,955	-	-	-	9,930,478
1890	6,302,198	4,638,496^{3}	2,097,426	1,295,795^{3}	-	-	-	14,333,915
1940	26,171,778	8,744,365^{4}	6,035,869	-	242,320	-	41,983	41,236,315
1950	32,027,661	13,786,742	5,692,657	-	329,082	-^{5}	108,255	51,944,397
1960	42,838,639	20,706,431	6,116,848	-	482,848	-^{6}	46,604	70,191,370
1980	64,540,467	46,233,531	7,046,906	-	672,251	-	517,897	119,011,052
1991	75,704,927	62,316,064	7,335,136	-	630,656	294,135	534,878	146,815,796
2000	91,298,042	65,318,092	10,554,336	-	761,583	734,127	1,206,675	169,872,856
2010	91,051,646	82,277,333	14,517,961	-	2,084,288	817,963	6,608	190,755,799
2022	88,252,121	92,083,286	20,656,458	-	850,130	1,227,642		203,080,756
Race or Color	Brancos	Pardos	Pretos	Caboclos	Amarelos	Indigenous	Undeclared	Total
1872	38.14%	38.28%	19.68%	3.90%	-	-	-	100%
1890	43.97%	32.36%	14.63%	9.04%	-	-	-	100%
1940	63.47%	21.21%	14.64%	-	0.59%	-	0.10%	100%
1950	61.66%	26.54%	10.96%	-	0.63%	-	0.21%	100%
1960	61.03%	29.50%	8.71%	-	0.69%	-	0.07%	100%
1980	54.23%	38.85%	5.92%	-	0.56%	-	0.44%	100%
1991	51.56%	42.45%	5.00%	-	0.43%	0.20%	0.36%	100%
2000	53.74%	38.45%	6.21%	-	0.45%	0.43%	0.71%	100%
2010	47.73%	43.13%	7.61%	-	1.09%	0.43%	0.00%	100%
2022	43.46%	45.34%	10.17%	-	0.42%	0.60%		100%

^1The 1900, 1920, and 1970 censuses did not count people for "race".

^2In the 1872 census, people were counted based on self-declaration, except for slaves, who were classified by their owners.

^3The 1872 and 1890 censuses counted "caboclos" (White-Amerindian mixed race people) apart. In the 1890 census, the category "pardo" was replaced with "mestiço". Figures for 1890 are available at the IBGE site.

^4In the 1940 census, people were asked for their "color or race"; if the answer was not "White", "Black", or "Yellow", interviewers were instructed to fill the "color or race" box with a slash. These slashes were later totaled in the category "pardo". In practice this means answers such as "pardo", "moreno", "mulato", "caboclo", etc.

^5In the 1950 census, the category "pardo" was included on its own. Amerindians were counted as "pardos".

^6The 1960 census adopted a similar system, again explicitly including Amerindians as "pardos".

== Controversy ==
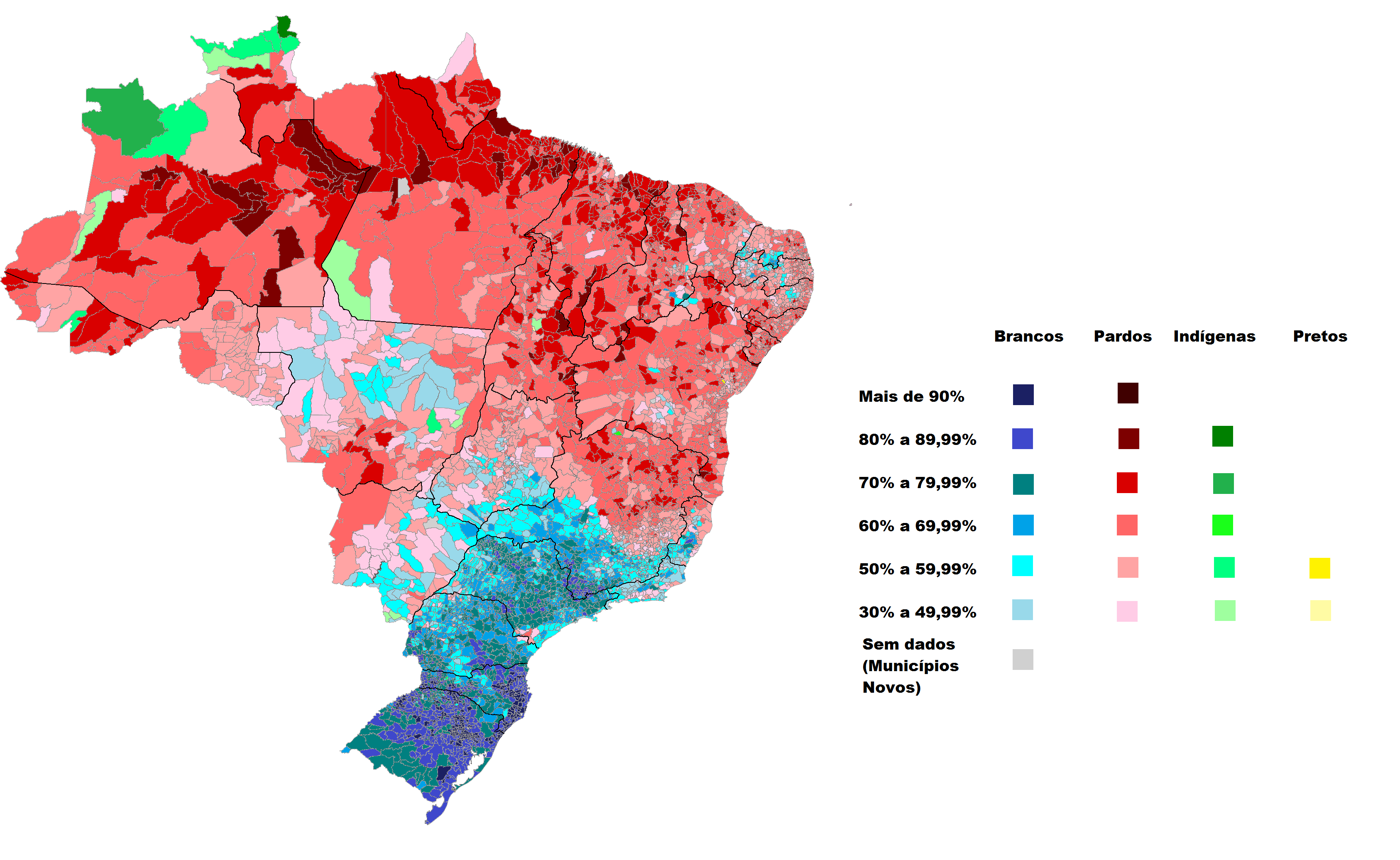
A map of predominant racial groups by municipality. Green indicates an indigenous majority, blue a white majority, red a pardo majority, and yellow a black majority.

As the IBGE itself acknowledges, these categories are disputed, and most of the population dislike it and do not identify with them. Most Brazilians see "Indígena" as a cultural rather than racial term, and don't identify as such if they are part of the mainstream Brazilian culture; many Brazilians would prefer to self-describe as "morenos" (used in the sense of "tanned" or "brunettes"); some Black and parda people, more identified with the Brazilian Black movement, would prefer to self-describe as "Negro" as an inclusive category containing pardos and pretos; and if allowed to choose any classification, Brazilians will give almost 200 different answers.

According to the American scholar Edward Telles, in Brazil there are three different systems related to "racial classification" along the White-Black continuum. The first is the Census System, which distinguishes three categories: "branco" (White), "pardo", and "preto" (Black). The second is the popular system that uses many different categories, including the ambiguous term "moreno" ("tanned", "brunette", or "with an olive complexion"). The third is the Black movement system that distinguishes only two categories, summing up "pardos" and "pretos" as "negros". More recently, the term "afrodescendente" has been brought into use.

The first system referred by Telles is that of the IBGE. In the census, respondents choose their race or color in five categories: branca (white), parda (multiracial), preta (black), amarela (yellow) or indígena (indigenous). The term "parda" needs further explanation; it has been systematically used since the census of 1940. People were then asked for their "colour or race"; if the answer was not "White", "Black", or "Yellow", interviewers were instructed to fill the "colour or race" box with a slash. These slashes were later summed up in the category "pardo". In practice this means answers such as "pardo", "moreno", "mulato", and "caboclo". In the following censuses, "pardo" became a category on its own, and included Amerindians, which became a separate category only in 1991. The term describes people who have a skin darker than Whites and lighter than Blacks, but does not necessarily imply a White-Black mixture.

Telles' second system is that of popular classification. Two IBGE surveys (the 1976 PNAD and the July 1998 PME) have sought to understand the way Brazilians think of themselves in "racial" terms, with the explicit aim of adjusting the census classification (neither, however, resulted in actual changes in the census). Besides that, Data Folha has also conducted research on this subject. The results of these surveys are somewhat varied, but seem to coincide in some fundamental aspects. First, there is an enormous variety of "racial" terms in use in Brazil; when Brazilians are inquired in an open ended question, from 135 to 500 different race-color terms may be brought. The 1976 PNAD found 136 different answers to the question about race; the July 1998 PME found 143. However, most of these terms are used by very small minorities. Telles remarks that 95% of the population chose only six different terms (branco, moreno, pardo, moreno-claro, preto and negro); Petrucelli shows that the 7 most common responses (the above plus amarela) sum up 97%, and the 10 more common (the previous plus mulata, clara, and morena-escura) make 99%.

Petrucelli, analysing the July 98 PME, finds that 77 denominations were mentioned by only one person in the sample. Other 12 are misunderstandings, referring to national or regional origin (francesa, italiana, baiana, cearense). Many of the "racial" terms are (or could be) remarks about the relation between skin colour and exposure to sun (amorenada, bem morena, branca-morena, branca-queimada, corada, bronzeada, meio morena, morena-bronzeada, morena-trigueira, morenada, morenão, moreninha, pouco morena, queimada, queimada de sol, tostada, rosa queimada, tostada). Others are clearly variations of the same idea (preto, negro, escuro, crioulo, retinto, for Black, alva, clara, cor-de-leite, galega, rosa, rosada, pálida, for White, parda, mulata, mestiça, mista, for "parda"), or clarifications of the same concept (branca morena, branca clara), and can actually be grouped together with one of the main racial terms without falsifying the interpretation. Some seem to express an outright refusal of classification: azul-marinho (navy blue), azul (blue), verde (green), cor-de-burro-quando-foge (literally, "the color of a donkey that has run away", a humorous Portuguese term for a color that cannot be determined).

Petrucelli grouped those 136 terms into 28 wider categories. Most of these 28 wider categories can be situated in the White-Black continuum when the answers to the open-ended question are compared to the answers in the IBGE format:

Category	Frequency	White	Mixed-race	Black	Amerindian	Yellow	Total	difference between White and Black
branca (White)	54.28%	98.96%	0.73%	0.11%	0.07%	0.14%	100.00%	98,85
loira (Blonde)	0.05%	95.24%	0.00%	4.76%	0.00%	0.00%	100.00%	90,48
brasileira (Brazilian)	0.12%	91.20%	6.05%	2.27%	0.00%	0.47%	100.00%	88,93
branca + (adjectivated White)	0.14%	86.47%	9.62%	0.00%	3.91%	0.00%	100.00%	86,47
clara (of light colour)	0.78%	86.40%	11.93%	0.35%	0.14%	1.18%	100.00%	86,05
galega (Galician)	0.01%	70.99%	19.78%	0.00%	0.00%	9.23%	100.00%	70,99
castanha (Brown)	0.01%	63.81%	36.19%	0.00%	0.00%	0.00%	100.00%	63,81
morena clara (light Morena)	2.92%	38.35%	57.12%	1.46%	2.27%	0.81%	100.00%	36,89
jambo	0.02%	14.47%	77.96%	2.39%	5.18%	0.00%	100.00%	12,08
morena	20.89%	13.75%	76.97%	6.27%	2.62%	0.38%	100.00%	7,48
mestiça, mista (miscegenated, mixed)	0.08%	17.29%	59.44%	14.96%	7.60%	0.70%	100.00%	2,33
parda (multiracial)	10.40%	1.03%	97.25%	1.40%	0.21%	0.10%	100.00%	−0,37
sarará	0.04%	9.09%	60.14%	23.25%	0.00%	7.53%	100.00%	−14,16
canela (of the colour of cinnamon)	0.01%	11.13%	57.55%	26.45%	4.87%	0.00%	100.00%	−15,32
mulata (Mulatto)	0.81%	1.85%	71.53%	25.26%	1.37%	0.00%	100.00%	−23,41
marrom, chocolate (Brown, chocolate)	0.03%	4.56%	57.30%	38.14%	0.00%	0.00%	100.00%	−33,58
morena escura (dark Morena)	0.45%	2.77%	54.80%	38.05%	4.15%	0.24%	100.00%	−35,28
escura (of dark colour)	0.38%	0.59%	16.32%	81.67%	1.42%	0.00%	100.00%	−81,08
negra (Black)	3.14%	0.33%	6.54%	92.62%	0.50%	0.02%	100.00%	−92,29
preta (Black)	4.26%	0.37%	1.73%	97.66%	0.17%	0.06%	100.00%	−97,29

The other categories, except, naturally, for "amarela" (Yellow) seem related to Amerindian "race":

Category	Frequency	White	Mixed-race	Black	Amerindian	Yellow	Total
vermelha (Red)	0.02%	58.97	8.22	0.00	21.56	11.24	100.00
cafusa	0.01%	6.02	65.14	22.82	6.02	0.00	100.00
caboverde (Capeverdian)	0.02%	0.00	48.72	23.08	28.21	0.00	100.00
cabocla	0.02%	3.60	49.37	10.43	36.60	0.00	100.00
bugre (Indian)	0.00%	12.50	37.50	0.00	50.00	0.00	100.00
amarela (Yellow)	1.11%	3.27	0.98	0.24	0.15	95.36	100.00
indígena (Indigenous)	0.13%	0.44	2.12	0.00	96.13	1.30	100.00

The remarkable difference of the popular system is the use of the term "moreno". This is actually difficult to translate into English, and carries a few different meanings. Derived from Latin maurus, meaning inhabitant of Mauritania, traditionally it is used as a term to distinguish White people with dark hair, as opposed to "ruivo" (redhead) and "loiro" (blonde). It is also commonly used as a term for people with an olive complexion, a characteristic that is often found in connection with dark hair. In connection to this, it is used as a term for suntanned people, and is commonly opposed to "pálido" (pale) and "amarelo" (yellow), which in this case refer to people who aren't frequently exposed to sun. Finally, it is also often used as a euphemism for "pardo" and "preto".

Finally, the Black movement system, in direct opposition to the popular system, groups "pardos" and "pretos" in a single category, "negro" (and not Afro-Brazilian). This looks more similar to the American racial perception, but there are some subtle differences. First, as other Brazilians, the Black movement understands that not everybody with some African descent is Black, and that many or most White Brazilians indeed have African (or Amerindian, or both) ancestrals – so a "one-drop rule" is not what the Black movement envisages.

=== Race and class ===
Another important discussion is the relation between social class and "race" in Brazil. It is commonplace to say that, in Brazil, "money whitens." There is a persistent belief, both in academy and popularly, that Brazilians from the wealthier classes with darker phenotypes tend to see themselves and be seen by others in lighter categories. Other things, such as dressing and social status, also influence perceptions of race.

However, some studies, focusing in the difference between self- and alter-classification show that this phenomenon is far more complex than "money whitens". For instance, according to a study conducted by Paula Miranda-Ribeiro and André Junqueira Caetano among women in Recife, while there is significant inconsistency between the "parda" and "preta" categories, most women are consistently classified by themselves and interviewers into "brancas" and non-brancas. 21.97% of women were consistently classified as White, and 55.13% of women were consistently classified as non-White, while 22.89% of women where inconsistently classified.

But the inconsistently classified women reveal an important aspect of economic "whitening". "Self-darkening" women, i.e., those who view themselves as "pretas" or "pardas" but are classified as "brancas" by the interviewers (4.08% of women) have above average education, while the 18.82% "self-whitening" women have a low average education, lower indeed than that of consistently non-White women.

This, assuming, that there is a correlation between wealth and education, would show that, rather than "Brazilians from the wealthier classes with darker phenotypes seeing themselves and being seen by others in lighter categories", either wealth affects their perception by others, but does not affect, or at least affects considerably less, their self-perception, or that wealth in fact affects their self-perception in the opposite way: it is poor people who are more prone to self-whitening. This, naturally, contributes to show that self-classification in censuses is in fact more objective than alter-classification; but most importantly, it shows that economic differences between Whites and non-Whites effectively exist.

It is important to notice that the alter-classification in this survey was made by a group of college students, i.e., mostly middle-class people.

David de Micheli argues that the recent phenomenon of racial reclassification toward blackness is a result of the expansion of public education.

==== Racial disparities ====
There are important differences in social position concerning "races". These differences encompass income, education, housing, etc. According to the 2010 IBGE Census, White workers wages were almost twice those of Blacks and "Pardos" (Multiracial). The illiteracy rate among White people over 5 years old was 5.9%; among Blacks, 14.4%, and among "Pardos" (Multiracial), 13%. The 2010 IBGE Census shows that Whites also dominate higher education in Brazil, considering the age group between 15 and 24 years old, 31.1% of the White population attended university. In relation to "Pardos" (Multiracial) and Blacks, the rates are 13.4% and 12.8%, respectively.

According to the 2007 Brazilian national resource, the White workers had an average monthly income almost twice that of Blacks and "Pardos" (Multiracial). The Blacks and Mixed-race earned on average 1.8 minimum wages, while the Whites had a yield of 3.4 minimum wages. Among workers with over 12 years of study, the difference was also large. While the Whites earned on average R$15.90 per hour, the Blacks and Mixed-race received R$11.40, when they worked the same period. Among the 1% richest population of Brazil, only 12% were Blacks and Mixed-race, while Whites constituted 86.3% of the group. In the 10% poorest there were 73.9% of Blacks and Mixed-race, and 25.5% of Whites.

45.3% of the Brazilian population identify as Brown/Mixed-race. Those that identify themselves as White form 43.5%, the Black 10.2%, the Indigenous 0.8% and the East Asian 0.4%, according to the IBGE. The region with the highest proportion of Mixed-race is the North, with 67.2%. The population of the Northeast is composed of 13.0% of Blacks, the largest proportion. In the South, 72.6% of the population is White.

== Genetic studies ==
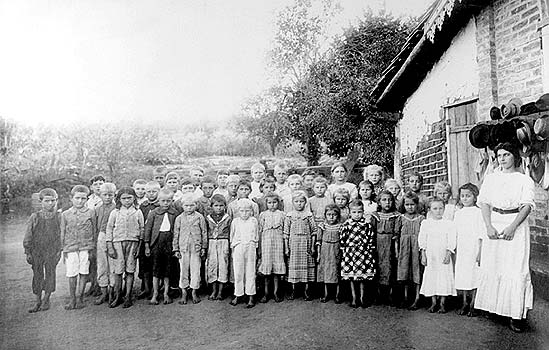
Italian students in Campinas.

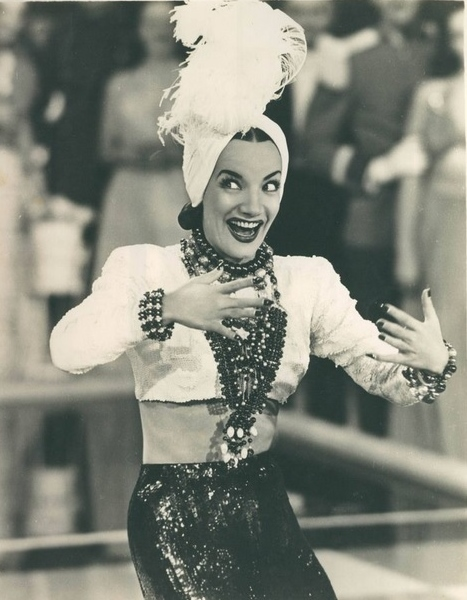
Singer Carmen Miranda, nicknamed "the Brazilian bombshell", was born in Portugal and emigrated with her family to Brazil in 1910, when she was ten months old.

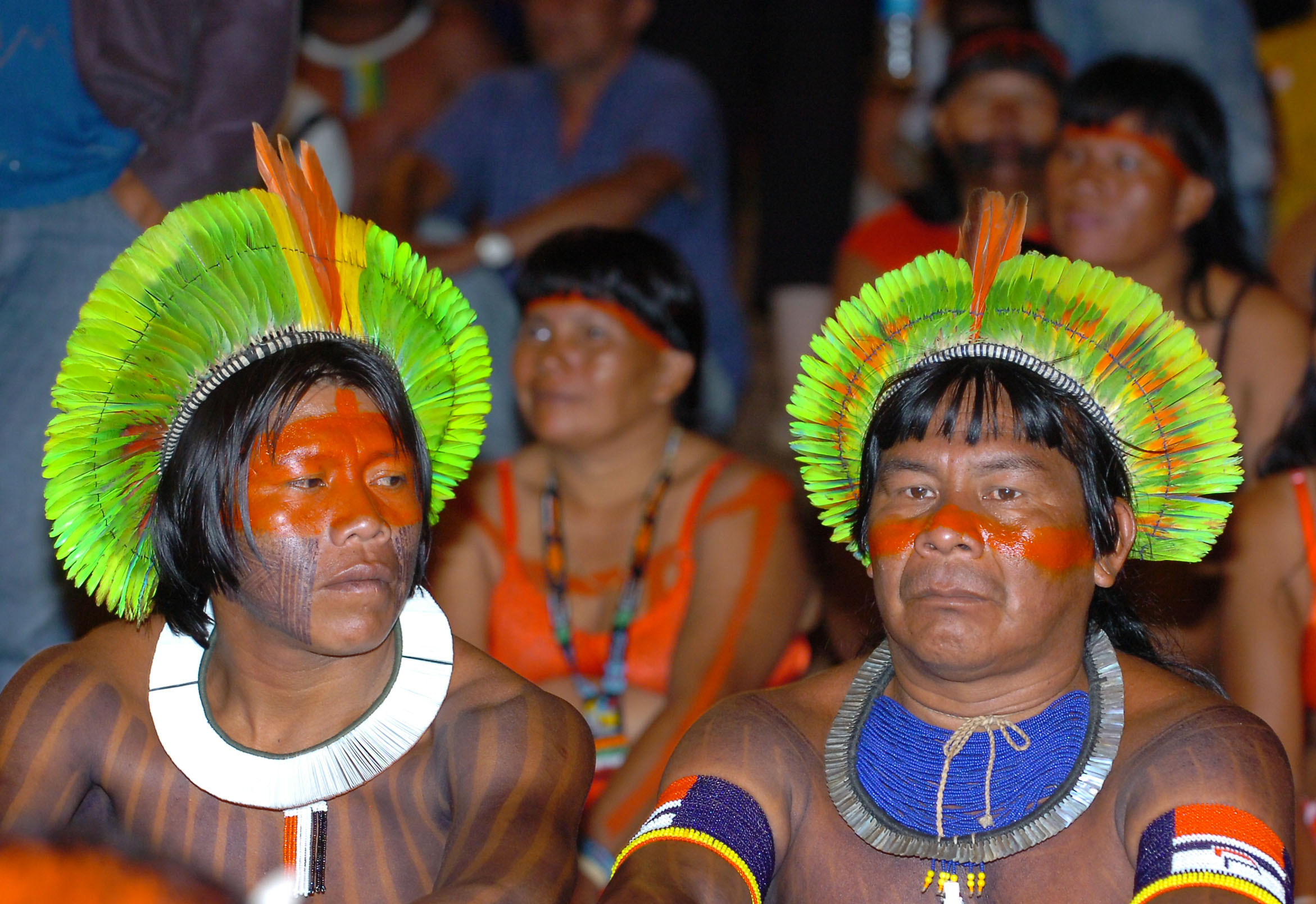
Two indigenous men.

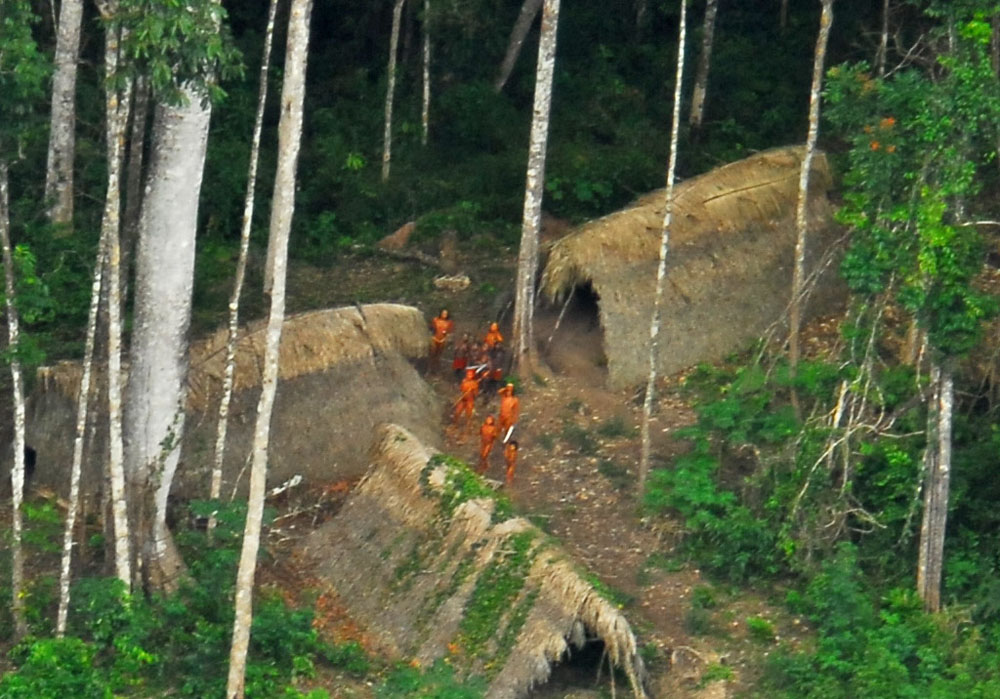
Members of an uncontacted tribe encountered in the Brazilian state of Acre in 2009.

Genetic autosomal studies have shown the Brazilian population as a whole to have European, African and Native Americans components, presenting a triracial admixture pattern. A recent 2019 review of 51 autosomal genetic studies have found that the predominant genetic component in the Brazilian population is of European origin representing about 68% of the overall ancestry.

=== Autosomal studies ===
A recent 2019 systematic review of 51 autosomal genetic studies, comprehending 81 populations of 19 states from five regions of Brazil has found the following values for the total mean genetic ancestry of the Brazilian population: 68.1% European, 19.6% African, and 11.6% Native American. To reduce the potential of bias from studies with different sampling methods, the mean genetic ancestry was weighted by the number of individuals in each study. At the regional level, the highest European contribution occurred in the South, while the highest African and Native American contributions occurred in the Northeastern and Northern regions, respectively.

Region	European	African	Native American
North Region	52.6%	19.8%	27.7%
Northeast Region	50.8%	35.2%	13.9%
Central-West Region	62.7%	24.2%	13.1%
Southeast Region	68.1%	19.6%	11.6%
South Region	81.8%	8.4%	8.6%

A 2015 autosomal genetic study, which also analyzed data of 25 studies of 38 different Brazilian populations concluded that: European ancestry accounts for 62% of the heritage of the population, followed by the African (21%) and the Native American (17%). The European contribution is highest in Southern Brazil (77%), the African highest in Northeast Brazil (27%) and the Native American is the highest in Northern Brazil (32%).

Region	European	African	Native American
North Region	51%	16%	32%
Northeast Region	58%	27%	15%
Central-West Region	64%	24%	12%
Southeast Region	67%	23%	10%
South Region	77%	12%	11%

An autosomal study from 2013, with nearly 1,300 samples from all of the Brazilian regions, found a pred. degree of European ancestry combined with African and Native American contributions, in varying degrees. Following an increasing North to South gradient, European ancestry was the most prevalent in all urban populations (with values up to 74%).

The populations in the North consisted of a significant proportion of Native American ancestry that was about two times higher than the African contribution. Conversely, in the Northeast, Center-West and Southeast, African ancestry was the second most prevalent. At an intrapopulation level, all urban populations were highly admixed, and most of the variation in ancestry proportions was observed between individuals within each population rather than among population.

Region	European	African	Native American
North Region	51%	17%	32%
Northeast Region	56%	28%	16%
Central-West Region	58%	26%	16%
Southeast Region	61%	27%	12%
South Region	74%	15%	11%

An autosomal DNA study (2011), with nearly 1000 samples from every major race group ("whites", "pardos" and "blacks", according to their respective proportions) all over the country found out a major European contribution, followed by a high African contribution and an important Native American component.

"In all regions studied, the European ancestry was predominant, with proportions ranging from 60.6% in the Northeast to 77.7% in the South". The 2011 autosomal study samples came from blood donors (the lowest classes constitute the great majority of blood donors in Brazil), and also public health institutions personnel and health students.

Region	European	African	Native American
Northern Brazil	68.80%	10.50%	18.50%
Northeast Brazil	60.10%	29.30%	8.90%
Southeast Brazil	74.20%	17.30%	7.30%
Southern Brazil	79.50%	10.30%	9.40%

A study from 2009 analyzed the information content of 28 ancestry-informative SNPs into multiplexed panels using three parental population sources (African, Amerindian, and European) to infer the genetic admixture in an urban sample of the five Brazilian geopolitical regions. The SNPs assigned apart the parental populations from each other and thus can be applied for ancestry estimation in a three hybrid admixed population. Estimates of average ancestry were as follows: European ancestry (0.771) followed by African (0.143) and Amerindian contributions (0.085).

It is important to note that "the samples came from free of charge paternity test takers, thus as the researchers made it explicit: "the paternity tests were free of charge, the population samples involved people of variable socioeconomic strata, although likely to be leaning slightly towards the pardo group".

Region	European	African	Native American
North Region	71.10%	18.20%	10.70%
Northeast Region	77.40%	13.60%	8.90%
Central-West Region	65.90%	18.70%	11.80%
Southeast Region	79.90%	14.10%	6.10%
South Region	87.70%	7.70%	5.20%

An autosomal DNA study from 2009 found a similar profile "all the Brazilian samples (regions) lie more closely to the European group than to the African populations or to the Mestiços".

Region	European	African	Native American
North Region	60.6%	21.3%	18.1%
Northeast Region	66.7%	23.3%	10.0%
Central-West Region	66.3%	21.7%	12.0%
Southeast Region	60.7%	32.0%	7.3%
South Region	81.5%	9.3%	9.2%

São Paulo state, the most populous state in Brazil, with about 40 million people, showed the following composition, according to an autosomal study from 2006: European genes account for 79% of the heritage of the people of São Paulo, 14% are of African origin, and 7% Native American. A study from 2013, found the following composition in São Paulo state: 61.9% European, 25.5% African and 11.6% Native American. A more recent 2024 study in São Paulo using representative samples collected in 2015 has found the following average genetic ancestry: 71.5% European, 18.2% African and 6.1% Native American.

=== MtDna and y DNA studies ===
According to a genetic study about Brazilians, on the paternal side, 98% of the White Brazilian Y Chromosome comes from a European male ancestor, only 2% from an African ancestor and there is a complete absence of Amerindian contributions. On the maternal side, 39% have a European Mitochondrial DNA, 33% Amerindian and 28% African MtDNA. This analysis only shows a small fraction of a person's ancestry (the Y Chromosome comes from a single male ancestor and the mtDNA from a single female ancestor, while the contributions of the many other ancestors is not specified)., but it shows that genetic mixing in Brazil was directional, between Portuguese males and African and Amerindian females.

Analyzing Black Brazilians' Y chromosome, which comes from male ancestors through paternal line, it was concluded that half (50%) of the Black Brazilian population has at least one male ancestor who came from Europe, 48% has at least one male ancestor who came from Africa and 1.6% has at least one male ancestor who was Native American. Analyzing their mitochondrial DNA, that comes from female ancestors though maternal line, 85% of them have at least a female ancestor who came from Africa, 12.5% have at least a female ancestor who was Native Brazilian and only 2.5% have at least a female ancestor who came from Europe.

European and Middle Eastern lineages contributions to Y-haplogroup in the Brazilian population:

Region	Central-West	Northern	Northeastern	Southeastern	Southern
Portugal	45%	36%	18%	42%	63%
France	17%	52%	14%	-	0%
Italy	-	1%	61%	27%	14%
Germany	16%	-	7%	19%	17%
Lebanon	23%	12%	-	13%	4%

European and Middle eastern lineages contributions to R1b1a-M269 sub-haplogroups in Brazilian population

Region	Central-West	Northern	Northeastern	Southeastern	Southern
Portugal	47%	34%	20%	37%	12%
Spain	11%	35%	52%	27%	46%
France	21%	16%	-	20%	-
Italy	3%	6%	8%	5%	10%
Netherlands	11%	7%	3%	9%	7%
Germany	-	2%	11%	2%	21%
Lebanon/Turkey	7%	-	6%	-	3%

=== Descendants of colonial-era population ===
Sérgio Pena, a leading Brazilian geneticist, summed it up this way:

The correlation between color and genomic ancestry is imperfect: at the individual level one cannot safely predict the skin color of a person from his/her level of European, African and Amerindian ancestry nor the opposite. Regardless of their skin color, the overwhelming majority of Brazilians have a high degree of European ancestry. Also, regardless of their skin color, the overwhelming majority of Brazilians have a significant degree of African ancestry. Finally, most Brazilians have a significant and very uniform degree of Amerindian ancestry! The high ancestral variability observed in Whites and Blacks suggests that each Brazilian has a singular and quite individual proportion of European, African and Amerindian ancestry in his/her mosaic genomes.

Brazil's racial base are its colonial-era population, consisting of Amerindians, Portuguese settlers, and African slaves:

- At least 50% of the Brazilian paternal ancestry would be of Portuguese origin.
- European ancestry predominates in the Brazilian population as a whole, in all regions of Brazil, according to the vast majority of all autosomal studies undertaken covering the entire population, accounting for between 65% and 77% of the ancestry of the population.
- African ancestry is high in all regions of Brazil. 86% of Brazilians would have over 10% of their genes coming from Africans, according to a study based on about 200 samples from 2003. The researchers however were cautious about its conclusions: "Obviously these estimates were made by extrapolation of experimental results with relatively small samples and, therefore, their confidence limits are very ample". A new autosomal study from 2011, also led by Sérgio Pena, but with nearly 1000 samples this time, from all over the country, shows that in most Brazilian regions most Brazilians "whites" are less than 10% African in ancestry, and it also shows that the "pardos" are predominantly European in ancestry, the European ancestry being therefore the main component in the Brazilian population, in spite of a very high degree of African ancestry and significant Native American contribution. The African contribution was found to be thus distributed according to the 2011 autosomal study: 10.50% in the North region of Brazil, 29.30% in the Northeast of Brazil, 17.30% in the Southeast of Brazil and 10.30% in the South of Brazil. According to an autosomal study from 2008, African contribution accounts for 25% of the heritage of the population, and according to an autosomal study from 2010, it accounts for 14.30% of the ancestry of the population.
- Native American ancestry is significant and present in all regions of Brazil.

=== Descendants of immigrants ===
The largest influx of European immigrants to Brazil occurred in the late 19th and early 20th centuries. According to the Memorial do Imigrante statistics data, Brazil attracted nearly 5 million immigrants between 1870 and 1953. These immigrants were divided in two groups: a part of them was sent to Southern Brazil to work as small farmers. However, the biggest part of the immigrants was sent to Southeast Brazil to work in the coffee plantations. The immigrants sent to Southern Brazil were mainly Germans (starting in 1824, mainly from Rhineland-Palatinate, the others from Pomerania, Hamburg, Westphalia, etc.) and Italians (starting in 1875, mainly from the Veneto and Lombardia). In Southeastern Brazil, most of the immigrants were Italians (mainly from the Veneto, Campania, Calabria and Lombardia), Portuguese (mainly from Beira Alta, Minho and Alto Trás-os-Montes), Spaniards (mainly from Galicia and Andalusia) and smaller numbers of French (most came from the southern regions) and Dutch (from the Netherlands and Belgium).

Notably, the first half of the 20th century saw a large inflow of Japanese (mainly from Honshū, Hokkaidō and Okinawa) and Arabic-speaking Levantine Christians (from modern day Lebanon and Syria) immigrants.

Total of entries of immigrants in the Port of Santos, São Paulo (1908–1936) – Gender.
Nationalities	Total	% Male	% Female
Portuguese	275,257	67.9	32.1
Spaniards	209,282	59.4	40.6
Italians	202,749	64.7	35.3
Japanese	176,775	56.2	43.8
Germans	43,989	64.3	35.7
"Turks"	26,321	73.4	26.6
Romanians	23,756	53.2	46.7
Yugoslavians	21,209	52.1	47.9
Lithuanians	20,918	58.6	41.4
Syrians	17,275	65.4	34.6
Poles	15,220	61.9	38.1
Austrians	15,041	72.7	27.3
Others	47,664	64.9	35.1
Total	1,221,282	63.8	36.2

== Ethnicities by region ==
Historically, the different regions of Brazil had their own migratory movements, which resulted in racial differences between these areas. The Southern region had a greater impact of the European immigration and has a large White majority, which contrasts with the Northern and Northeastern regions, which have a large Pardo (mixed-race) majority. In all regions of Brazil, European ancestry predominates in the population, followed by African and Amerindian ancestries. In Northern Brazil, native Amerindian ancestry is more significant than the African one, while in the Northeastern, Central-Western and Southeastern regions African ancestry is more important than the indigenous one.

The Census of 2007 revealed that the self-reported White population had its higher proportion in the state of Santa Catarina (86.6%) and the lowest in Bahia (20.9%). The Multiracial (Mixed) proportion was higher in Amazonas (72.4%) and lower in Santa Catarina (9.4%). The Black proportion varied from 17% in Bahia to 2.4% in Amazonas. Because of their small number, the Amerindian and Asian population were counted together and they had a higher proportion in Mato Grosso and Roraima (2.3%) and a lower proportion in Paraíba (0.1%).

Distribution by color or race by federative unit
UF	White	Black	Multiracial (Mixed)	Yellow (Asian)	Indigenous	No answer
AC	23.3	5.7	66.9	2	2.1	0
AL	31	6.6	60.8	1.1	0.4	0
AP	23.8	8.4	65.7	1.1	1.1	0
AM	21.2	4.1	69	0.9	4.8	0
BA	22	17	59.5	1.2	0.4	0
CE	31.6	4.6	62.3	1.2	0.2	0
DF	41.8	7.6	48.6	1.7	0.3	0
ES	42.1	8.3	48.7	0.6	0.3	0
GO	41.4	6.5	50.3	1.7	0.1	0
MA	21.9	9.6	66.9	1.1	0.5	0
MT	37.2	7.4	52.8	1.2	1.4	0
MS	46.8	4.9	44.1	1.2	2.9	0
MG	45.1	9.2	44.6	1	0.2	0
PA	21.6	7	69.9	0.9	0.5	0
PB	39.7	5.6	52.9	1.2	0.5	0
PR	70.1	3.1	25.4	1.2	0.2	0
PE	36.5	6.4	55.5	1	0.6	0
PI	24.2	9.3	64.3	2.1	0.1	-
RJ	47.4	12.1	39.6	0.8	0.1	0
RN	40.8	5.2	52.8	1.1	0.1	0
RS	83.2	5.5	10.6	0.3	0.3	0
RO	35	6.8	55.8	1.4	0.9	0.1
RR	20.9	6	60.9	1	11.2	-
SC	83.9	2.9	12.6	0.4	0.3	0
SP	63.7	5.4	29.4	1.4	0.1	0
SE	27.7	8.9	61.8	1.3	0.3	0
TO	24.5	9.1	63.6	2	0.9	0

Distribution by color or race by region
Região	White	Black	Multiracial (Mixed)	Yellow (Asian)	Indigenous	No answer
Brazil	47.5	7.5	43.4	1.1	0.4	0
Center-West	41.5	6.6	49.4	1.5	0.9	0
North	23.2	6.5	67.2	1.1	1.9	0
Northeast	29.2	9.4	59.8	1.2	0.4	0
Southeast	54.9	7.8	36	1.1	0.1	0
South	78.3	4	16.7	0.7	0.3	0

=== South ===
The South of Brazil is the region with the largest percentage of Europeans. According to the 2005 census, people of European ancestry account for 79.6% of the population. In colonial times, this region had a very small population.

The region what is now Southern Brazil was originally settled by Amerindian peoples, mostly Guarani and Kaingangs. Only a few settlers from São Paulo were living there. This situation made the region vulnerable to attacks from neighboring countries. This fact forced the King of Portugal to decide to populate the region. For this, settlers from the Portuguese Azores islands were sent to the coast in 1617.

To stimulate the immigration to Brazil, the king offered several benefits for the Azorean couples. Between 1748 and 1756, six thousand Portuguese from the Azores moved to the coast of Santa Catarina. They were mainly newly married who were seeking a better life. At that time, the Azores were one of the poorest regions of Portugal. They established themselves mainly in the Santa Catarina Island, nowadays the region of Florianópolis. Later, some couples moved to Rio Grande do Sul, where they established Porto Alegre, the capital. The Azoreans lived on fishing and agriculture, especially flour. They comprised over half of Rio Grande do Sul and Santa Catarina's population in the late 18th century. The state of Paraná was settled by colonists from São Paulo due to their proximity (Paraná was part of São Paulo until the mid-19th century).

With the development of cattle in the interior of Rio Grande do Sul, African slaves began arriving in large numbers. By 1822, Africans were 50% of Rio Grande do Sul's population. This number decreased to 25% in 1858 and to only 5.2% in 2005. Most of them came from Angola.

After independence from Portugal (1822) the Brazilian government started to stimulate the arrival of a new wave of immigrants to settle the South. In 1824 they established São Leopoldo, a German community. Major Schaeffer, a German who was living in Brazil, was sent to Germany in order to bring immigrants. From Rhineland-Palatinate, the Major brought the immigrants and soldiers. Settlers from Germany were brought to work as small farmers, because there were many land holdings without workers.

To attract the immigrants, the Brazilian government had promised large tracts of land, where they could settle with their families and colonize the region. The first years were not easy. Many Germans died of tropical disease, while others left the colonies to find better living conditions. The German colony of São Leopoldo was a disaster. Nevertheless, in the following years, a further 4,830 Germans arrived at São Leopoldo, and then the colony started to develop, with the immigrants establishing the town of Novo Hamburgo (New Hamburg).

From São Leopoldo and Novo Hamburgo, the German immigrants spread into others areas of Rio Grande do Sul, mainly close to sources of rivers. The whole region of Vale dos Sinos was populated by Germans. During the 1830s and part of the 1840s German immigration to Brazil was interrupted due to conflicts in the country (Ragamuffin War). The immigration restarted after 1845 with the creation of new colonies. The most important ones were Blumenau, in 1850, and Joinville in 1851, both in Santa Catarina state; these attracted thousands of German immigrants to the region. In the next five decades, other 28 thousand Germans were brought to Rio Grande do Sul to work as small farmers in the countryside. By 1914, it is estimated that 50 thousand Germans settled in this state.

Another immigration boom to this region started in 1875. Communities with Italian immigrants were also created in southern Brazil. The first colonies to be populated by Italians were created in the highlands of Rio Grande do Sul (Serra Gaúcha). These were Garibaldi and Bento Gonçalves. These immigrants were predominantly from Veneto, in northern Italy. After five years, in 1880, the great numbers of Italian immigrants arriving caused the Brazilian government to create another Italian colony, Caxias do Sul. After initially settling in the government-promoted colonies, many of the Italian immigrants spread themselves into other areas of Rio Grande do Sul seeking further opportunities.

They created many other Italian colonies on their own, mainly in highlands, because the lowlands were already populated by Germans and native gaúchos. The Italian established many vineyards in the region. Nowadays, the wine produced in these areas of Italian colonization in southern Brazil is much appreciated within the country, though little is available for export. In 1875, the first Italian colonies were established in Santa Catarina, which lies immediately to the north of Rio Grande do Sul. The colonies gave rise to towns such as Criciúma, and later also spread further north, to Paraná.

A significant number of Poles have settled in Southern Brazil. The first immigrants arrived in 1869 and until 1959, it is estimated that over 100,000 Poles migrated to Brazil, 95% of whom were peasants. The State of Paraná received the majority of Polish immigrants, who settled mainly in the region of Curitiba, in the towns of Mallet, Cruz Machado, São Matheus do Sul, Irati, and União da Vitória.

=== Southeast ===
The Southeastern region of Brazil is the most ethnically diverse part of the country. Europeans make up 55.16% of its population, those of mixed-race 35.69%, and African descent 7.91%. It has the largest percentage of Asian Brazilians, composing 0.8%, and a small Amerindian community (0.2%).

Southeast Brazil is home to the oldest Portuguese village in the Americas, São Vicente, São Paulo, established in 1532. The region, since the beginning of its colonization, is a melting pot of Africans, Natives, and Europeans. The Indigenous peoples of the region were enslaved by the Portuguese. The race mixing between the indigenous females and their European masters produced the Bandeirante, the colonial inhabitant of São Paulo, who formed expeditions that crossed the interior of Brazil and greatly increased the Portuguese colonial territory. The main language spoken by these people of mixed Indian/Portuguese heritage was Língua geral, a language that mixed Tupi and Portuguese words.

In the late 17th century the Bandeirantes found gold in the area that nowadays is Minas Gerais. A gold rush took place in Brazil and thousands of Portuguese colonists arrived during this period. The confrontation between the Bandeirantes and the Portuguese for obtaining possession of the mines led to the Emboabas' War. The Portuguese won the war. The Amerindian culture declined, giving space to a stronger Portuguese cultural domination. In order to control the wealth, the Portuguese Crown moved the capital of Brazil from Salvador, Bahia to Rio de Janeiro. Thousands of African slaves were brought to work in the gold mines. They were landed in Rio de Janeiro and sent to other regions. By the late 18th century, Rio de Janeiro was an "African city": most of its inhabitants were slaves. No other place in the world had as many slaves since the end of the Roman Empire. In 1808 the Portuguese Royal Family, fleeing from Napoleon, took charge in Rio de Janeiro. Some 15,000 Portuguese nobles moved to Brazil. The region changed a lot, becoming more European.

After independence and principally after 1850, Southeast Brazil was "inundated" by European immigrants, who were attracted by the government to replace the African slaves in the coffee plantations. Most immigrants landed in the Port of Santos and have been forwarded to the coffee farms within São Paulo. The vast majority of the immigrants came from Italy. Brazil attracted nearly 5 million immigrants between 1870 and 1953. The large number of Italians are visible in many parts of Southeast Brazil. Their descendants are nowadays predominant in many areas. For example, Northeast São Paulo is 40% Italian.

=== Northeast ===
The population of Northeast Brazil is a result of an intensive race mixing, which has occurred in the region for more than four centuries. According to the 2006 census people reported as "Pardo" (Multiracial) make up 62.5% of the population. Those reported as African account for 7.8%.

This region did not have much effect from the massive European immigration that took place in Southern Brazil in the late 19th century and first decades of the 20th century. The Northeast has been a poorer region of Brazil since the decline of sugar cane plantations in the late 17th century, so its economy did not require immigrants.

The ethnic composition of the population starts in the 16th century. The Portuguese settlers rarely brought women, which led to relationships with the Indian women. Later, interracial relationships occurred between Portuguese males and African females. The coast, in the past the place where millions of African slaves arrived (mostly from modern-day Angola, Ghana, Nigeria and Benin) to work in sugar-cane plantations, is where nowadays there is a predominance of Mulattoes, those of African and European ancestry. Salvador, Bahia is considered the most African city in Brazil, with almost 80% of its inhabitants being African-Brazilians or Pardos. In the interior, there is a predominance of Indian and European mixture.

=== North ===
Northern Brazil, largely covered by the Amazon rainforest, is the Brazilian region with the largest Amerindian influences, both in culture and ethnicity. Inhabited by diverse indigenous tribes, this part of Brazil was reached by Portuguese and Spanish colonists in the 17th century, but it started to be populated by non-Indians only in the late 19th and early 20th centuries. The exploitation of rubber used in the growing industries of automobiles, has emerged a huge migration to the region.

Many people from the poor Northeast Brazil, mostly Ceará, moved to the Amazon area. The contact between the Indians and the northeastern rubbers created the base of the ethnic composition of the region, with its mixed-race majority.

=== Central-West ===
The Central-West region of Brazil was inhabited by diverse Indians when the Portuguese arrived in the early 18th century. The Portuguese came to explore the precious stones that were found there. Contact between the Portuguese and the Indians created a mixed-race population. Until the mid-20th century, Central-West Brazil had a very small population. The situation changed with the construction of Brasília, the new capital of Brazil, in 1960. Many workers were attracted to the region, mostly from northeastern Brazil.

A new wave of settlers started arriving from the 1970s. With the mechanization of agriculture in the South of Brazil, many rural workers of German and Italian origin migrated to Central-West Brazil. In some areas, they are already the majority of the population.

== Days celebrating racial groups in Brazil ==
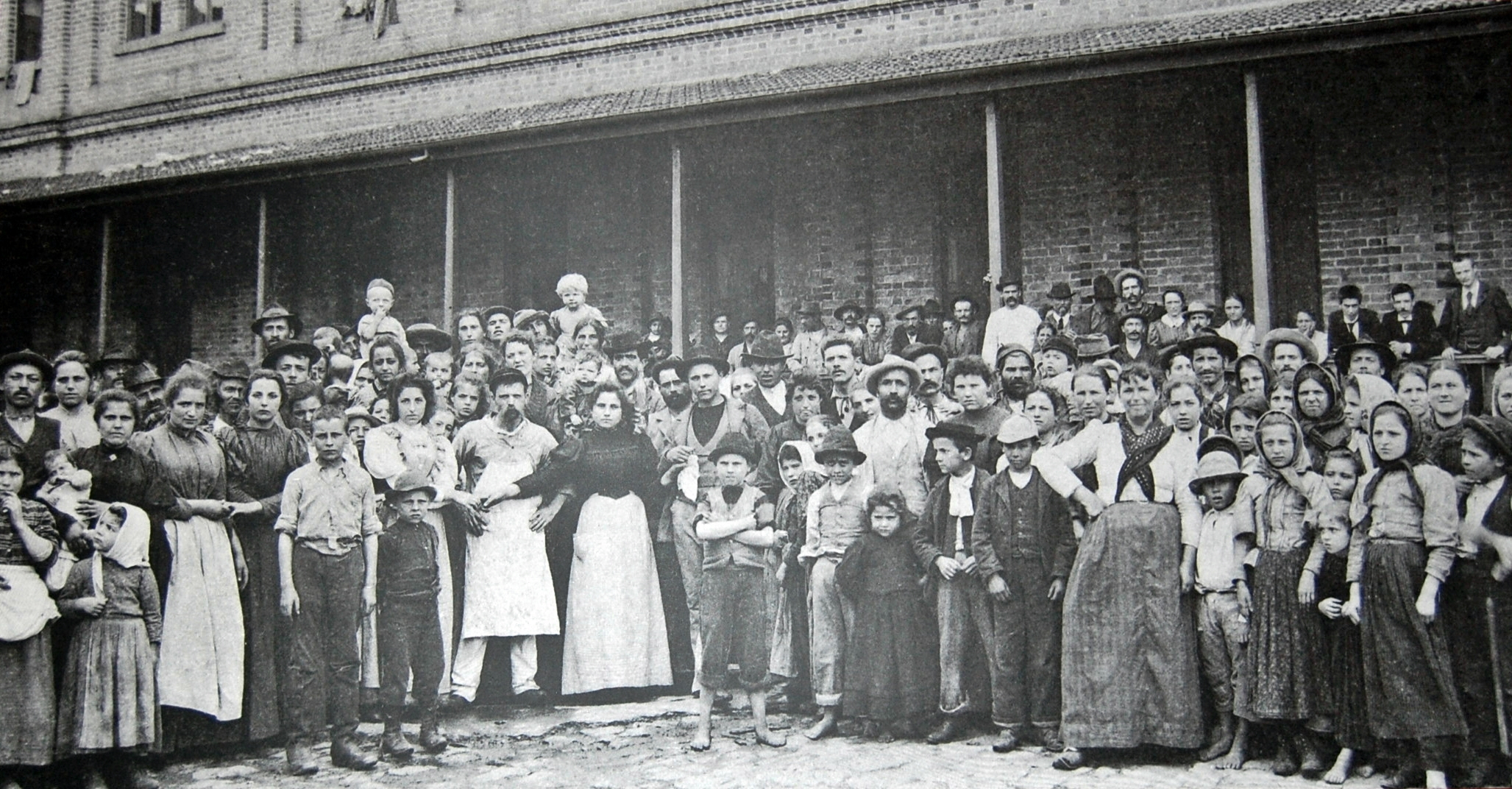
Italian immigrants in São Paulo

In Brazil, the "Day of the Caboclo" (Dia do Caboclo) is observed annually on June 24, in celebration of the contributions and identity of the original caboclos and their descendants. This date is an official public holiday in the State of Amazonas.

"Mixed Race Day" (Dia do Mestiço) is observed annually on June 27, three days after the Day of the Caboclo, in celebration of all mixed-race Brazilians, including the caboclos. The date is an official public holiday in three Brazilian states.

"Indigenous Peoples Day" (Dia dos Povos Indígenas), observed annually on April 19, recognizes and honours the indigenous peoples of Brazil.

"Black Awareness Day" (Dia da Consciência Negra) is observed annually on November 20 as a day "to celebrate a regained awareness by the black community about their great worth and contribution to the country". The date is an official public holiday in five Brazilian states.

== See also ==
- Demographics of Brazil
- Racism in Brazil
- Social apartheid in Brazil
- Racial whitening
- Racial democracy
- Post-abolition in Brazil
