= Youth in Namibia =

Youth in Namibia is defined as individuals between 16 and 30 years by the Namibia's revised National Youth Policy. This policy was created in 1993 and revised in 2006. The revised policy, "emphasis[es] employment creation, financial support for young entrepreneurs and access to agricultural land" as well as including citizenship, disability rights, peace, security, education, environment, and reproductive health. There are 610,437 youth in Namibia. According to the preliminary results of the 2023 Housing and Population Census (HPC) from the Namibia Statistics Agency revealed that 2.1 million of total population is under 35 years of age.

== Legacy from apartheid ==
Although Namibia transitioned from apartheid to multiracial democracy in early 1990 after independence, the policies from the apartheid era have left a continued legacy of significant inequalities. The burden of many of these inequalities falls on Namibian youth in terms of education, employment, poverty, and health outcomes. Previous government policies in Namibia have been unfavorable for twenty-first-century youth, diminishing their ability to engage meaningfully in socio-economic and political activities of the society. Before Namibia's independence, the country's education system was designed to reinforce the Apartheid system rather than provide the necessary human resource base to promote equitable social and economic development. It was fragmented along racial and ethnic lines, in what was termed the Bantu Education system, which was also being enforced in black communities in South Africa, with vast disparities in both the allocation of resources and the quality of education offered. This had had a great impact on the quality of education in the country. During apartheid, black children in Namibia were being oppressed and exploited just like their parents. Education under apartheid meant they lacked proper education, due to poorly qualified teachers and poorly funded schools. Youth frequently got arrested and detained in jail, often without trial.

== Education ==
In 2015, the youth literacy rate for Namibia was 94.88%. Though Namibia's youth literacy rate fluctuated substantially in recent years, it tended to increase through the 1991–2015 period ending at 94.88% in 2015. Nearly 21% of female youth of secondary school age are out of school compared to 19% of male youth of the same age. For the youth of secondary school age, the biggest disparity can be seen between the poorest and the richest youth.

== Unemployment ==
High rates of youth unemployment have been a prominent economic and social issue in the Namibian landscape. Youth Unemployment Rate in Namibia increased to 46.10 percent in 2018 from 43.40 percent in 2016. Microdata of Namibia Labor Force Survey 2012 Unemployment rates is 49.2% among female youths as compared to 36.1% among male youths. According to the Microdata of Namibia Labor Force Survey 2012, Youth unemployment rates of urban, 41.7% nevertheless, is lower compared to rural areas with 44.4%.
