= Racism in a Racial Democracy =

1997 book by France Winddance Twine

Racism in a Racial Democracy: The Maintenance of White Supremacy
- Author: France Winddance Twine
- Language: English
- Genre: Brazil Race Racism
- Publisher: Rutgers University Press
- Publication date: 1998
- Publication place: United States
- Pages: 176
- ISBN: 978-0813523651

Racism in a Racial Democracy: The Maintenance of White Supremacy in Brazil is a book by anthropologist France Winddance Twine published by Rutgers University Press in 1997.

Twine investigated racism under the idea of racial democracy while using a small town Vasalia (renamed for the research), Rio de Janeiro as her research site in January 1992 and February 1994 as two separate periods. The book revealed the idealization of racial democracy in Brazil with the reality of daily racism for Afro-Brazilians, and some Afro-Brazilians’ unawareness and avoidance of racism.

== Synopsis ==
Racism in a Racial Democracy: The Maintenance of White Supremacy in Brazil by France Winddance Twine explores the racism in Brazil from a sociological perspective. Even though Brazil nowadays stresses racial democracy, which claimed that every race has equal opportunities, Afro-Brazilians are still experiencing racism in their daily life. Twine researched in Vasalia (renamed the town), Rio de Janeiro to investigate the community dynamics between Afro-Brazilians and other non-Afro-Brazilians in the community, and she found a huge difference between them on perception of races and miscegenation, socioeconomic status, politics and social life. Twine interviewed Afro-Brazilians in the community about their perception of racism, their physical appearance and their family history. While interacting with Afro-Brazilians, Twine also interviewed some Euro-Brazilians and mixed race Brazilians on their perception on Afro-Brazilians, racism, perspectives on relationships and marriage. Chapter one started with the community practices of racism based on white supremacist theories and structures. Chapter two traced the history of Vasalia and the according political and economic development, when Portuguese and Italian immigrants were the coffee plantation owners and Afro-Brazilians were the slaves. Chapter three focused on the accountability of racism by interviewing Afro-Brazilians on their perception of racism, and many Afro-Brazilians answered with the nonexistence of racism. Chapter four explored the concept of racial democracy in Vasalia and the practices of white supremacy under the concept. Chapter five analyzed miscegenation and whitening issues among Vasalians while many Afro-Brazilians, and many Afro-Brazilians embraced whiteness. Chapter six explored Vasalians’ perception on relation to African descent and their family history on slavery. In chapter seven, Twine interviewed Afro-Brazilians professionals on their interpretation of racism.

== Critical reception ==
=== Peter Wade's Book Review ===
Review by Peter Wade in the Journal of Latin American Studies 30 (1998): 668-670.

Wade thinks the book Racism in a Racial Democracy was powerful because it addresses the problem of racism in Brazil under the ideology of racial equality. Wade commented that Twine gave representative everyday racism which was compelling and detailed. Twine also had the risk of falsely associating racial equality with racism. The book effectively reveals the problem that Brazilians deny the existence of racism with the premises of Brazil is a mixed race country and socioeconomic status was the main element that sets differences. Twine has successfully addressed racism as a problem in the Brazilian society when it was still a taboo. Twine made effective communications with the Afro-Brazilians through her interview questions, as she revealed Afro-Brazilians' perception in the community and their thoughts on racism. Twine tended to understand racism in Brazil from an American point of view, and showed Vasalians' false perceptions and unawareness of racism. Wade would like to hear more comments about the town of Vasalia in a bigger picture, and its comparison with Bahia, where the majority of the population was Afro-Brazilians.

=== Evandro Camara's Book Review ===
Review by Evandro Camara in the American Journal of Sociology 104 (1998): 911-913.

Camara reviewed Twine's Racism in a Racial Democracy and impressed by how Twine addressed racism and white supremacy in the book, which raised readers' awareness. However, Camara thought that the work displayed "the familiar sins of the revisionist scholarship." White supremacy was not only a problem exist in Brazil, but it generally exists in the Western society. Camara suggested that Twine should go on to identify particular aspects of the race problem across Brazil instead of narrowing in Vasalia, Rio de Janeiro. While the book was addressing the problem of racism under white supremacy, Twine also portrayed a dual society in Brazil, which is made up of whites and non-whites with the ideology of whitening into one entity. Camara also thought that the book should not simply generalize all the social problems into racism, as some might be related to socioeconomic status. From Camara's perspective, Brazil from the book would be just a country that resembles the US.

=== Bonilla-Silva's Book Review ===
Review by Eduardo Bonilla-Silva NACLA Report on the Americas vol. 35 issue 6 (May/Jun2002): 60.

Racial problems brought attention to scholars, as in Latin America they stressed about their identity as a whole picture. Bonilla-Silva complimented that the book was an advancement on the literature on race in Latin America. Bonilla-Silva thought that Twine had successfully addressed the race issues in Brazil, as Brazil portrayed an ideal image of race equality and inequalities were led by class differences. Twine had effectively provided how Afro-Brazilians thought about race in their daily life, which offered an insight of the problem on racism in a racial democracy background. Bonila-Silva thought that the book lacked a theory on stratification in Brazil. Bonilla-Silva recommended people to read the book as the book would be a powerful source of information to look deeply into Latin America's racial inequalities.
