= Racial democracy =

Term used to describe race relations in Brazil

Racial democracy (Portuguese: democracia racial) is a concept that denies the existence of racism in Brazil. Some scholars of race relations in Brazil argue that the country has escaped racism and racial discrimination. Those researchers cite the fact that most Brazilians claim not to view others through the lens of race, and thus the idea of racial discrimination is irrelevant.

Many sociologists and anthropologists, however, view the idea of racial democracy as myth or ideology that seeks to validate the ideal that Brazil is a place where people of all races can participate in society equally. They instead emphasize the compelling evidence of inequalities motivated by racism as well as cultural, social, and political structures that privilege white Brazilians.

== History ==
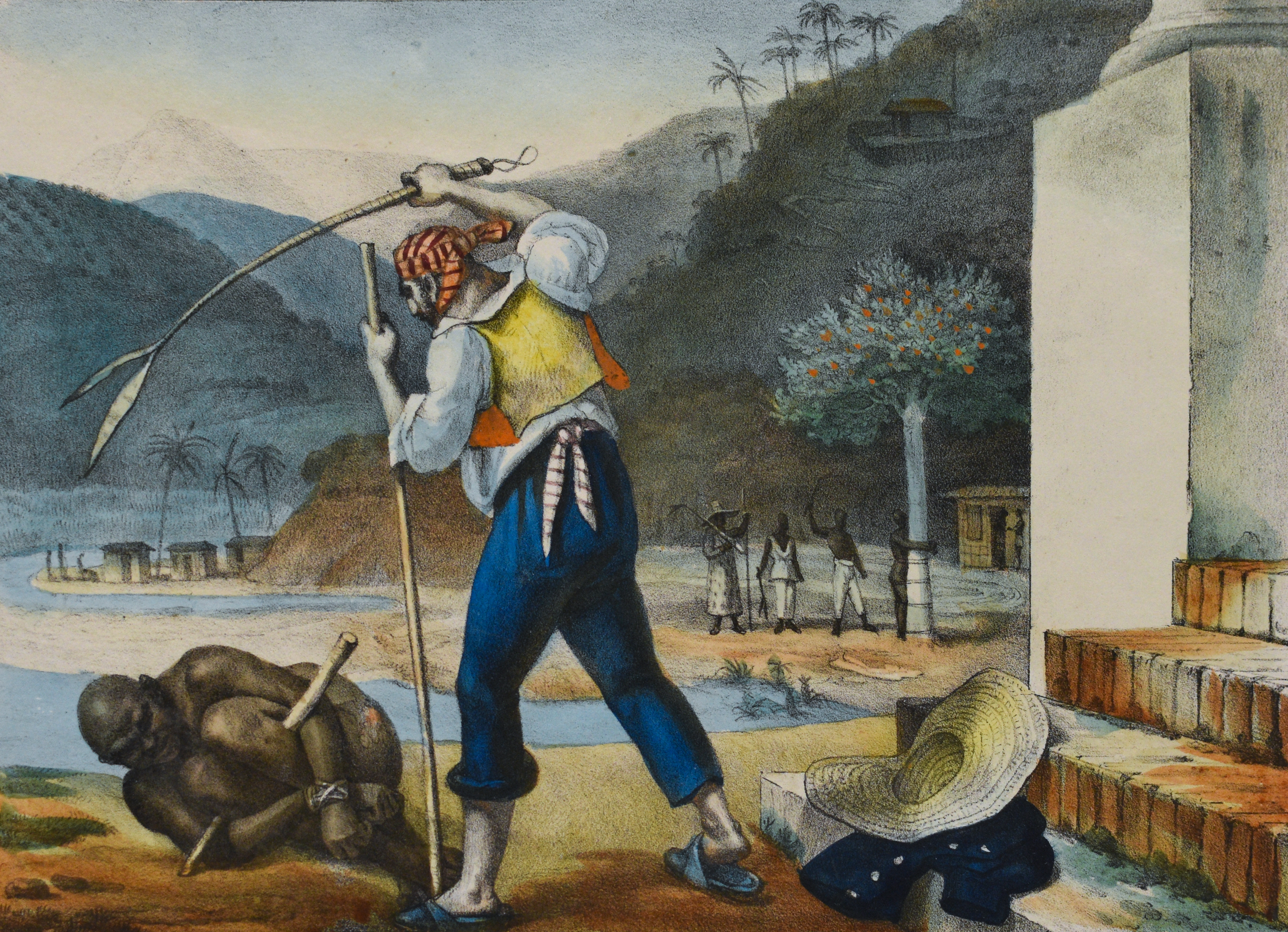
Slave being punished, watercolor by Jean-Baptiste Debret.

It was a common view among Brazilian elites, from the end of the Second Reign until the beginning of the Republic, that Brazil had escaped the problem of racial prejudice, based on the theory that in Brazil there had been a kind of mild slavery and harmony between masters and slaves. It was also common to compare the racial situation observed in the United States at that time with the image that was formed of the national reality, concluding that in Brazil black people were treated much better.

But this was not true, and several authors contested this view already in the 19th century. Later research reaffirmed the falsity of the ideas of social harmony and mild slavery, showing how black people lived in rustic and often unhealthy housing, performed heavy labor in long working hours, received little medical assistance and low-quality food, and were systematically abused physically, morally, psychologically and sexually. Resistance to domination frequently resulted in brutal repression with humiliations and severe physical punishments that often led to mutilation, deformation, disfigurement or death. As noted by Leonardo Boff, "history was written by the white hand".

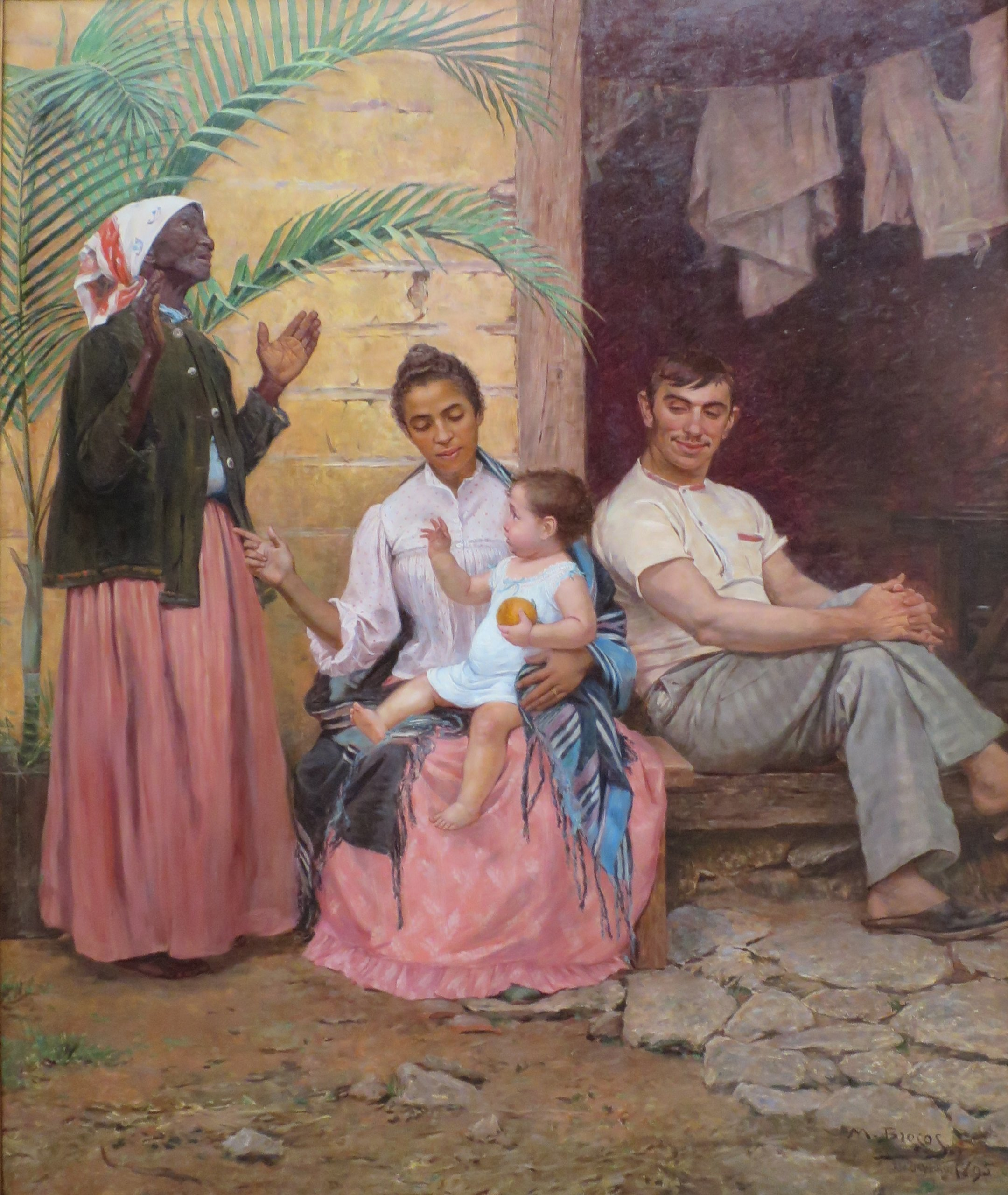
A Redenção de Cam (1895), painting by Modesto Brocos y Gomes. Black grandmother, mulatto daughter, white son-in-law and grandson: for the government of the time, with each generation Brazilians would become whiter.

At the same time, the whitening of the Brazilian population was desired, supported by theories of eugenics and selective miscegenation and implemented through state colonization programs with populations of European immigrants. The whitening theory was regarded as a scientific truth and was widely disseminated until the mid-20th century. It was based on the presumption of white superiority, understanding miscegenation as a way to make the population lighter, based on the belief that the gene of the white race would prevail over the others and that people in general would seek partners lighter than themselves. Thus it was asserted that whitening would produce a healthy mixed-race population capable of becoming ever whiter, both culturally and physically. For this reason, the ideal of miscegenation was seen as an effective mechanism for the absorption of the mestizo and the long-term elimination of traits of the black ethnic group in the population. The objective of these mechanisms was neither to promote the social advancement of a certain portion of blacks and mulattos nor to establish racial equality, but, on the contrary, to preserve the hegemony of the dominant race. Reflecting the aforementioned ideal, João Batista de Lacerda, director of the National Museum, and the only Latin American to present a report at the First Universal Races Congress in London in 1911, went so far as to state:

"In Brazil one has already seen children of mixed-race individuals presenting, in the third generation, all the physical characteristics of the white race [...]. Some retain a few traces of their black ancestry through the influence of atavism [...] but the influence of sexual selection [...] tends to neutralize that of atavism and remove from the descendants of mixed-race individuals all the traits of the black race [...] By virtue of this process of ethnic reduction, it is logical to expect that in the course of another century the mixed-race population will have disappeared from Brazil. This will coincide with the parallel extinction of the black race in our midst".

Martiniano Silva explains that miscegenation is an ancient process of ethnic and cultural enrichment of peoples, capable of producing civilizations, and that it occurs spontaneously. He states that historically racial miscegenation in Brazil "was never treated and never existed as a free, spontaneous, and therefore natural process of union between two peoples". On the contrary, the black woman was exploited, dishonored and morally and sexually violated through forced unions imposed by fear and insecurity, producing children conceived without a legally recognized father, remaining in the status of slaves, thus producing no racial and cultural enrichment of any civilization. He concludes by saying that one must not confuse the discharacterization of a people through sexual violence with the myth of a racial democracy. However, there are numerous cases of black women married to white men, black women who slept with masters on their own initiative, and black women treated like princesses by white masters. What was not very common during the period were black men with white women.

The myth of racial democracy also gained strength from narratives pointing to the existence of many successful mixed-race individuals, but ignored the fact that these cases were a small minority and concealed a reality of discrimination even among mixed-race people, who, in view of the heavy burden of prejudices that fell upon blacks, often tried to hide their origins or deny them as a strategy for social survival. In this context, mixed-race individuals were often more or less accepted by white society by identifying them as "blacks with a white soul", which fit into the ideologies of population whitening.

However, according to the sociologist Oracy Nogueira, one of the first scholars of racism in Brazil, the presence of mixed-race individuals in the middle classes in Brazil is extremely widespread, yet the great majority of these people neither perceive themselves nor are perceived as mixed-race, but rather as white.

When it was observed that even after the abolition of slavery in 1888 blacks and pardos remained in an inferior situation, it was justified by saying that, since the legal impediments to their advancement had been dissolved and since in Brazil there was no prejudice, if success did not occur it was due to their own fault, reiterating racist ideologies that viewed the black person as lazy, morally degraded, averse to work, ignorant, intellectually inferior and incapable of taking advantage of the opportunities that opened up. In the words of Petrônio Domingues, "according to this conception, the black person would come to conceive freedom as the opposite of work. Freedom as the opposite of responsibility. Freedom as the opposite of discipline. In addition, scientific racism endorsed the hypothesis according to which such deficiencies were more biological than cultural in nature". This scientistic discourse exempted former slave masters and the state from responsibility for the situation of blacks and gained official status, and its propaganda was so efficient that it was accepted even by part of the black and mixed-race population.

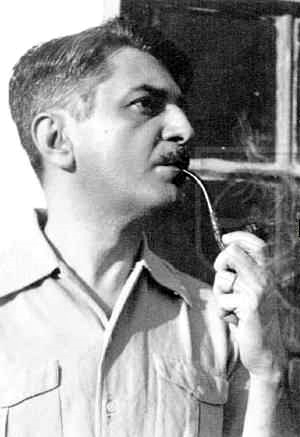
Gilberto Freyre

With the work Casa-Grande & Senzala (1933), by the historian and sociologist Gilberto Freyre, the theories of racial democracy and social harmony were systematized and gained prominence in reaffirming an idyllic image of Brazilian reality. Although the author did not deny the existence of violence and inequality, he tended to describe them as circumstantial rather than fundamental, and gave greater importance to the contribution of blacks and indigenous peoples to culture and to miscegenation itself in the formation of the population as a dynamic, adaptive, democratizing and non-conflictual process that tended to balance antagonisms. According to Clóvis Moura, Gilberto Freyre characterized slavery in Brazil as composed of flexible masters and conforming slaves. Freyre's myth of the "good master" would be an attempt to interpret the contradictions of slavery as an unimportant episode that would not have the power to nullify the supposed harmony between masters and slaves. The work received immediate acclaim from a significant part of the intelligentsia, but soon also began to be criticized as a fanciful reading of the national past, while some critics understood it as a utopian project of a profoundly racist society.

During the Brazilian military dictatorship (1964–1985) the myth of racial democracy was once again emphasized, as the government understood struggles against discrimination as a threat to the project of maintaining order, social peace and national security. The manual of the Escola Superior de Guerra included black movements among the agents of "antagonism", considering that they could introduce "subversive" ideas of incitement to hatred or racism in the country. Black movements were monitored, repressed and persecuted, and after the institution of the AI-5 meetings of activist groups became practically impossible.

=== Present day ===
Racist theories, whether purely ideological or disguised as science, penetrated Brazilian culture on a large scale and were not only taken as truths but also naturalized inequalities and made discussion about the situation of black people difficult, reinforcing discriminatory cultural practices and public policies, in addition to harming the formation of a politicized consciousness among black people, the understanding of their history and culture, and the construction of their own identity, weakening the sense of solidarity and group belonging among the black population.

Since the 1970s black movements have celebrated 13 May, the day of the abolition of slavery, as the National Day of Denunciation Against Racism, encouraging reflection and denunciation of structural racism, inequality and violence against black people. Even today the idea of the existence of a racial democracy in the country is widely disseminated. According to Joaze Bernardino, "it is nothing new to say that a significant majority of Brazilians recognize themselves as 'mixed', just as they value this 'mixture'. What happens when this miscegenation is emphasized and valued is that there is a confusion of racial mixture on the biological level with racial interrelations in the sociological sense. Assuming that the former occurred without conflict [...] suggests that the latter also existed without conflict".

Data from the Institute for Applied Economic Research (IPEA) reveal that Brazil in 1999 had around 53 million poor people and 22 million indigent people. It was found that blacks represented 45% of the Brazilian population, but accounted for 64% of the poor population and 69% of the indigent population. Whites in turn, being 54% of the total Brazilian population, represented 36% of the poor and 31% of the indigent. Blacks represented 70% of the bottom 10% of the population, while among the richest 10% only 15% were black. "White Brazil" was about 2.5 times richer than "Black Brazil". The Gini coefficient of Brazil was 0.59, while that of the white population was 0.58 and that of the black population 0.54. The average schooling of a black person aged 25 was around 6.1 years of study; a white person of the same age had about 8.4 years of study. The inequality was not recent. The historical series from 1929 to 1974 shows that schooling increased for everyone during this period, but the proportional inequality between blacks and whites remained unchanged. In all years of the series and for all segments, the levels of performance and school attendance of blacks were lower than those of whites. Indicators of access to garbage collection, sewage disposal, access to electricity and water supply were always lower for blacks than for whites. The study concluded by stating:

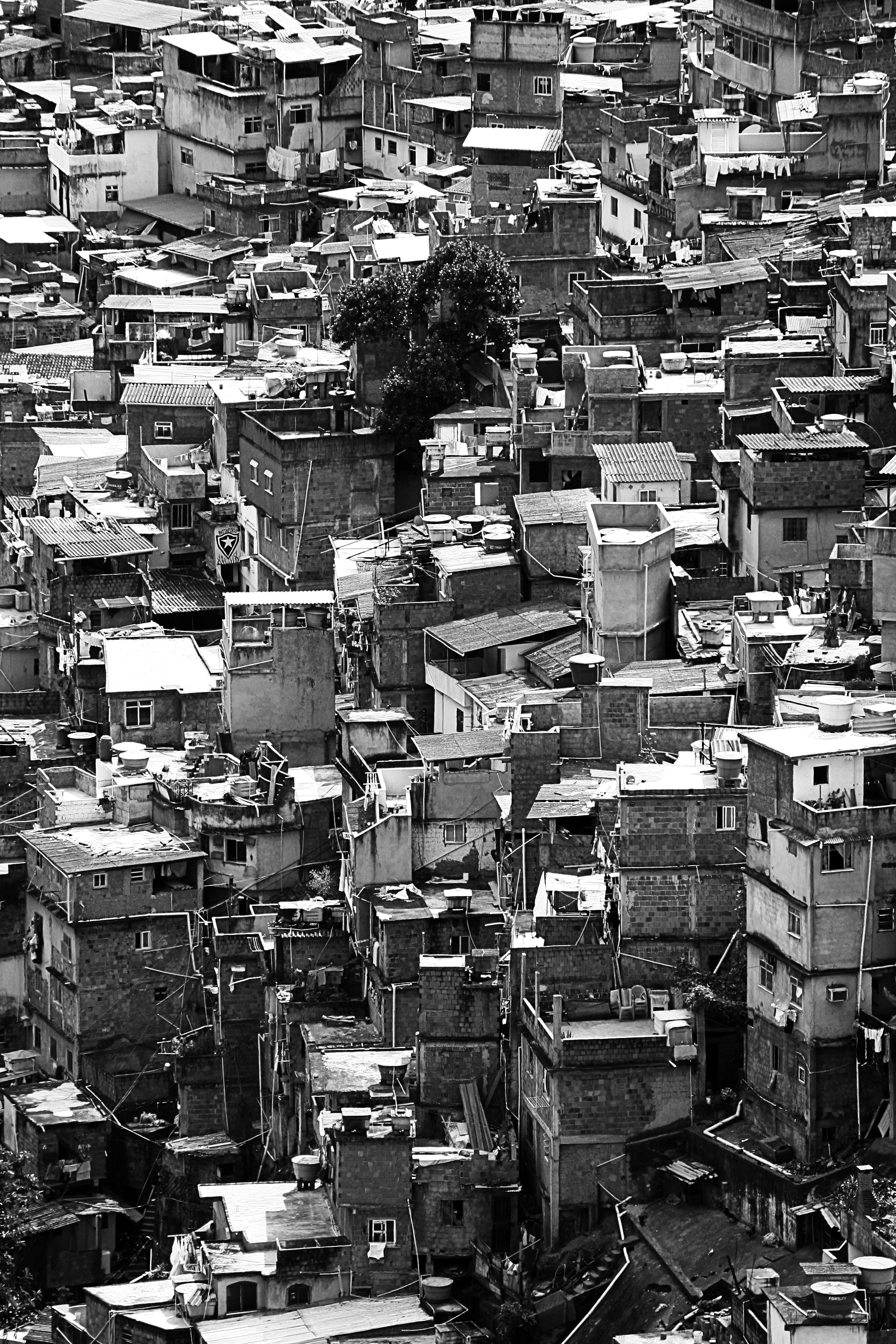
Detail of the Rocinha favela, the largest in Brazil.

"[It is attested] in a striking way, the intense inequality of opportunities to which the black population in Brazil is subjected. Poverty, as we have seen, is not 'democratically' distributed among the races. Blacks are overrepresented in poverty and indigence, considering both age distribution, regional distribution and gender structure. [...] The schooling of whites and blacks, in turn, clearly exposes the inertia of the pattern of racial discrimination. As we have seen, despite improvements in the average levels of schooling of whites and blacks throughout the century, the pattern of discrimination - that is, the difference in schooling of whites in relation to blacks - remains stable across generations. [...] The other socioeconomic dimensions analyzed, let us recall, refer to child labor, the labor market, housing conditions and consumption of durable goods. In all of them, as in education and poverty, we repeatedly observe that there are differences between whites and blacks, with blacks always at a disadvantage".

Other indicators of access to health, education, income, employment, among others, reinforce the existence of a broad inequality of opportunities and realities in Brazil, making the myth of racial democracy unsustainable. In 2008 blacks were the majority in favelas, with 66.1% of households headed by blacks. In São Paulo, in 2016, 70% of favela residents were black and pardos. According to the IBGE, in 2016 the illiteracy rate of whites was 4.2%, and that of blacks or pardos was 9.9%; the average income from all work was R$ 2,814 for whites, R$ 1,606 for pardos and R$ 1,570 for blacks; among children aged 5 to 7 who were forced to work, 35.8% were white and 63.8% black or pardo, and the unemployment rate was 9.5% for whites, 14.5% for pardos and 13.6% for blacks.

A study by IPEA showed that in Brazil, out of every seven individuals murdered, five are Afro-descendants. The study also stated that "if it is true that the profound social inequalities existing in the country are behind many of our dramas (such as divided cities; differences in lethality between poor and rich; and between blacks and non-blacks), on the other hand, the social question does not exhaust the explanation of the striking differences in violent victimization that affect the Afro-descendant population more, which reflect, in part, the racism still prevailing in Brazil". Racist jokes and sayings are common in Brazilian popular culture, reinforcing discrimination and marginalization, perpetuating stereotypes and creating the impression that racism is merely a joke.

The Statute of Racial Equality promulgated in 2010 aimed to curb racial discrimination and establish policies to reduce the social inequality existing between different racial groups. Complementary legislation and public policies of racial quotas have managed to advance somewhat the issue of inequality, but there is still much resistance to the general acceptance that Brazil is a racist country. Much literature still denies this fact or echoes old ideas that racism in Brazil is milder and more benign than in other countries. For Matheus Ávila, the myth of racial democracy "is an idea that ends up masking a highly racist, exclusionary, conflictive and discriminatory social reality, in addition to deepening unjust social roots and stratifications, legitimizing social inequality in Brazil". For Ronaldo de Sales Júnior, the myth of racial democracy is an ideological mechanism that reproduces crystallized racial relations, preventing an enlightened and impartial public debate about racism from occurring. According to Fernando Ferreira,

"Our racism combines inclusion with social exclusion. In sports, in music, in the body of the law, we manage to provide some inclusion. But if we examine statistics on leisure, work or birth, the scenario is disharmonious. Any foreigner entering private clubs, elite theaters or luxurious restaurants will notice the whiter complexion of the people in these privileged places. We, because we are inserted into a process of naturalization of these discrepancies, hardly recognize these differences. [...] Moreover, the fact that we are still debating whether or not there is racism in the country indicates our lack of vocation to understand our history. To say that we are not racist is not irony, it is ideology".

== Debate ==
Racial democracy as an ideal was first advanced by Brazilian sociologist Gilberto Freyre in his work Casa-Grande & Senzala (English: The Masters and the Slaves), published in 1933. Although Freyre never uses this term in the book, he did adopt it in later publications, and his theories paved the way for other scholars who would popularize the concept.

Freyre argued that several factors, including close relations between masters and slaves prior to their legal emancipation in 1888 and the supposedly benign character of Portuguese imperialism prevented the emergence of strict racial categories. Freyre also argued that continued miscegenation between the three races (Amerindians, the descendants of African slaves, and whites) would lead to a "meta-race", i.e.', a "postracial race" or a "race beyond race(s)".

Freyre's theory became a source of national pride for Brazil, which contrasted itself favorably vis-a-vis the contemporaneous racial divisions and violence in the United States. Over time, his theory would become widely accepted both among Brazilians of all stripes and many foreign academics. Black researchers in the United States would make unfavorable comparisons between their own country and Brazil during the 1960s.

In the past four decades, after the publication in 1974 of Thomas E. Skidmore's Black into White, a revisionist study of Brazilian race relations, scholars have begun to criticize the notion that Brazil is actually a "racial democracy". Skidmore argues that the predominantly white elite within Brazilian society promoted racial democracy to obscure very real forms of racial oppression.

Michael Hanchard, a political scientist at the University of Pennsylvania, has argued that the ideology of racial democracy, often promoted by state apparatuses, prevents effective action to combat racial discrimination by leading people to ascribe discrimination to other forms of oppression and allowing government officials charged with preventing racism to deny its existence a priori.

France Winddance Twine's 1997 ethnography also appears to support those contentions.

Hanchard compiles a great deal of research from other scholars demonstrating widespread discrimination in employment, education, and electoral politics. The seemingly paradoxical use of racial democracy to obscure the realities of racism has been referred to by scholar Florestan Fernandes as the "prejudice of having no prejudices". That is, because the state assumes the absence of racial prejudice, it fails to enforce what few laws exist to counter racial discrimination, as it believes that such efforts are unnecessary. In 2015, North American anthropologist John Collins argued that shifting engagements with collective memory, genealogically-based accounts of ancestry, and even UNESCO World Heritage programs have articulated with efforts by the Black Movement, academics, and progressive government actors to undermine claims about racial democracy in ways that increasingly lead Brazilians to self-identify as Black.

=== Gilberto Freyre on criticism ===
The life of Gilberto Freyre, after he published Casa-Grande & Senzala, became an eternal source of explanation. He repeated several times that he did not create the myth of a racial democracy, and that the fact that his books recognized the intense mixing between "races" in Brazil did not signify a lack of prejudice or discrimination. He pointed out that many people have claimed the United States to have been an "exemplary democracy" whereas slavery and racial segregation were present throughout most of the history of the United States.

"The interpretation of those who want to place me among the sociologists or anthropologists who said prejudice of race among the Portuguese or the Brazilians never existed is extreme. What I have always suggested is that such prejudice is minimal ... when compared to that which is still in place elsewhere, where laws still regulate relations between Europeans and other groups".

"It is not that racial prejudice or social prejudice related to complexion are absent in Brazil. They exist. But no one here would have thought of "white-only" Churches. No one in Brazil would have thought of laws against interracial marriage ... Fraternal spirit is stronger among Brazilians than racial prejudice, color, class or religion. It is true that equality has not been reached since the end of slavery ... There was racial prejudice among plantation owners, there was social distance between the masters and the slaves, between whites and blacks ... But few wealthy Brazilians were as concerned with racial purity as the majority were in the Old South".

== See also ==
- Assimilado
- Casta
- Colonial mentality
- Colorism
- Czechoslovak myth
- La Raza Cósmica
- Lusotropicalism
- Mongrel complex
- Multiracial democracy
- Pardo
- Partus sequitur ventrem
- Race in Brazil
- Racial hierarchy
- Racial hygiene
- Racial whitening in Brazil (Blanqueamiento)
- Racism in Brazil
- Racism in a Racial Democracy
- Rainbow nation
- Religious harmony in India
- White privilege
- Whitewashing (beauty)
