= Social apartheid =

De facto segregation on the basis of class or economic status

Social apartheid is de facto residential segregation on the basis of class or economic status, in which an underclass is forced to exist separated from the rest of the population.

The word "apartheid", an Afrikaans word meaning "separation", gained its current connotation during the years of South Africa's apartheid system of government-imposed racial segregation, which took place between 1948 and 1994.

As part of that system, the then-National Party-run government declared certain regions as being "for whites only", with populations of people of colour being forcibly relocated to designated, remote areas, that were deemed less desirable to live in, under the Group Areas Act. The racial segregation and many other negative consequences that resulted from that Act remain in place today, despite South Africa now being a multiracial democracy.

This is especially obvious in Cape Town, where spatial planning under the Group Areas Act was so "successful" in terms of its intended outcomes, that many areas remain with very similar racial demographics to the way they were under apartheid - generationally-transferred societal stratification.

== Urban apartheid ==
Typically a component in social apartheid, urban apartheid refers to the spatial segregation of minorities to remote areas. In the context of South African Apartheid, this is defined by the reassigning of the four racial groups defined by the Population Registration Act of 1950, into "Group Areas" as outlined by the Group Areas Act of 1950. Outside of the South African context, the term has also come to be used to refer to ghettoization of minority populations in cities within particular suburbs or neighborhoods.

== Notable cases ==
=== Latin America ===
==== Brazil and Venezuela ====
The term has become common in Latin America in particular in societies where the polarization between rich and poor has become pronounced and has been identified in public policy as a problem that needs to be overcome, such as in Brazil, where the term was coined to describe a situation where wealthy neighbourhoods are protected from the general population by walls, electric barbed wire and private security guards and where inhabitants of the poor slums are subjected to violence.

=== Asia ===
==== Malaysia ====
In Malaysia, as part of the concept of Ketuanan Melayu (lit. Malay supremacy), a citizen that is not considered to be of Bumiputera status face many roadblocks and discrimination in matters such as economic freedom, education, healthcare and housing.

==== Israel ====
"Social apartheid" can used to describe the systemic segregation and discrimination faced by Palestinians both in Israel and the occupied territories. The concept of apartheid brings into focus the wide discrepancies in housing, infrastructure, and public services that separate Jewish and Palestinian citizens, often as a product of government policy. Palestinian citizens of Israel are often concentrated in underdeveloped towns and neighborhoods with poor infrastructure and limited economic opportunities compared to predominantly Jewish areas.

In the occupied West Bank, this is even more profound, where Palestinians are severely restricted in their movements with checkpoints and the separation barrier, which impede access to basic services such as healthcare and education. Meanwhile, Israeli settlements built on occupied Palestinian territory enjoy better infrastructure and services, deepening the disparities.

=== Europe ===
==== France and Northern Ireland ====
The term social apartheid has also been used to explain and describe the ghettoization of Muslim immigrants to Europe in impoverished suburbs and as a cause of rioting and other violence. A notable case is the social situation in the French suburbs, in which largely impoverished Muslim immigrants being concentrated in particular housing projects, and being provided with an inferior standard of infrastructure and social services. The issue of urban apartheid in France was highlighted as such in the aftermath of the 2005 civil unrest in France. It has also been used to describe the segregation in Northern Ireland.

=== Africa ===
==== South Africa ====
In South Africa, the term "social apartheid" has been used to describe persistent post-Apartheid forms of exclusion and de facto segregation which exist based on class but which have a racial component, because the majority of poor individuals in South Africa are black. "Social apartheid" has been cited as a factor in the composition of HIV/AIDS in South Africa.

National, provincial, and Municipal governments have rolled out various initiatives over the years which have been aimed at reversing the historic negative consequences of the Group Areas Act, and its racial segregation in terms of the country's suburbs. One such example is the City of Cape Town approving the use of land for below-market rate housing development (a form of social housing), such as that in the Conradie Park development in Pinelands.

This kind of zoning approval and funding support means that those who could not otherwise afford to live near to where they work (which, in the case of Cape Town, is likely somewhere in the City Bowl, where many companies are headquartered), can now have the opportunity to do so. That, in turn, enables them to find meaningful work (or any work), as well as have shorter commute times, and enjoy the nicer areas of the city in their free time, which are then more easily accessible to them. This building of affordable housing in well-reasoned areas is a major move towards reversing the impacts of past unequal treatment of racial groups in South Africa.

== See also ==
- Auto-segregation
- Classism
- Multiculturalism
