= Casa-Grande & Senzala =

1933 book by Gilberto Freyre

- Author: Gilberto Freyre
- Subject: Non-fiction
- Genre: Brazil
- Publication date: 1933
- Publication place: Brazil

Casa-Grande e Senzala (English: The Masters and the Slaves) is a book published in 1933 by Gilberto Freyre, about the formation of Brazilian society. The casa-grande ("big house") refers to the slave owner's residence on a sugarcane plantation, where whole towns were owned and managed by one man. The Senzala ("slave quarters") refers to the dwellings of the black working class, where they originally worked as slaves, and later as servants.

The book deals with race/class separation and miscegenation and is generally considered a classic of modern cultural anthropology. In Freyre's opinion, the hierarchy imposed by those in the Casa-Grande was an expression of a patriarchal society. In this book the author refutes the idea that Brazilians were an "inferior race" because of race-mixing. He points to the positive elements that permeated Brazilian culture because of miscegenation (especially among the Portuguese, Indians, and Africans). Portugal, like Brazil, is described as being culturally and racially influenced by "an energetic infusion of Moorish and Negro blood, the effects of which persist to this day in the Portuguese people and the Portuguese character". The book has been criticized in recent years by a few academics for downplaying the brutality of colonialism in Brazil and instead celebrating the hybridity which is indirectly a product of violence against Black and Indigenous people in the country.
