= Multiracial democracy =

Type of democratic political system

Multiracial democracy is a democratic political system that is multiracial. It is cited as aspiration in South Africa after apartheid and as existing for the United States after the Jim Crow laws and the Indian termination policy.

== See also ==
- Anti-racism
- Apartheid
- Cultural mosaic
- Civil rights movement
- Ethnopluralism
- Intercultural relations
- Internal resistance to apartheid
- Historical race concepts
- Multicultural education
- Multiculturalism
- Multinational state
- Multiracialism
- Polyculturalism
- Racial democracy
