= Soares =

Soares is a common surname in the Portuguese language and Galician, namely in the Portuguese speaking world, as well as other places. It was originally a patronymic, meaning Son of Soeiro. It is equivalent to the Spanish surname Suárez. Notable people named Soares include:

== People ==
=== General ===
- Alana Soares, American model and actress
- António Soares dos Reis (1847–1889), Portuguese sculptor
- Armando Zeferino Soares (1920–2007), Cape Verdean composer
- Claudette Soares (1935–2026), Brazilian singer
- Diandra Soares, Indian model, fashion designer and television host
- Diogo Soares (explorer), 16th-century Portuguese navigator and explorer
- Elza Soares (1930–2022), Brazilian samba singer
- Emelina Soares (born 1993), Indian artist, art historian, and educator
- Estevam Soares (born 1956), Brazilian football (soccer) head coach
- Ilka Soares (1932–2022), Brazilian actress
- Isa Soares (journalist), Portuguese journalist
- Isa Soares (born 1953), Brazilian-born Argentine dancer and activist
- Jô Soares (1938–2022), Brazilian comedian, author and talk show host
- João Clemente Baena Soares (1931–2023), Brazilian diplomat
- Joffre Soares (1918–1996), Brazilian actor
- John Soares (born 1981), American film director, actor, motion picture editor and fight choreographer
- Luiz Eduardo Soares (born 1954), Brazilian anthropologist, philosopher and political scientist
- Lota de Macedo Soares (1910–1967), Brazilian aesthete
- Maria Barroso (Maria de Jesus Simões Barroso Soares) (1925–2015), Portuguese public figure
- Matos Soares (d. 1957), Portuguese Catholic priest
- Nate Soares (born 1989), president of MIRI and coauthor of If Anyone Builds It, Everyone Dies
- Oscar Niemeyer Soares Filho (1907–2012), Brazilian architect
- Rodrigo R. Soares, Brazilian economist
- Romildo Ribeiro Soares (born 1947), Brazilian televangelist and missionary
- Teresinha Soares (1927–2026), Brazilian artist
- Tynisha Keli (Tynisha Keli Soares) (born 1985), American R&B-pop singer
- Ulisses Soares (born 1958), Brazilian religious leader
- Valeska Soares (born 1957), Brazilian artist

=== Politicians ===
- Soares Sambu, politician from Guinea-Bissau
- António Pinto Soares (1780–1865), former Head of State of Costa Rica
- António Soares Carneiro (1928–2014), Portuguese military officer and politician
- Cássio Soares (born 1981), Brazilian politician
- David Soares (born 1969), American politician
- David Soares (Brazilian politician) (born 1973), Brazilian politician
- Delúbio Soares (born 1955), Brazilian politician
- Edmilson Soares (1952–2025), Brazilian politician
- Fátima Soares, Venezuelan politician
- João Soares (politician) (born 1949), Portuguese politician
- Marcelo Miranda Soares (1938–2026), Brazilian politician
- Mário Soares (1924–2017), Portuguese politician
- Mário Lino Soares Correia (born 1940), Portuguese politician

=== Footballers ===
- A. J. Soares (born 1988), American soccer player
- Adilson Soares Cassamá (born 1983), Bissau-Guinean footballer
- Bruna Soares (born 1985), Brazilian women's footballer
- Cédric Soares (born 1991), Portuguese footballer
- Clemerson de Araújo Soares (born 1977), Brazilian footballer
- Ernesto da Conceição Soares (born 1979), Cape Verdian footballer
- Everton Soares (born 1996), Brazilian footballer
- Fabiano Vieira Soares (born 1984), Brazilian footballer
- Felipe Soares (born 1985), Brazilian footballer
- Geilson de Carvalho Soares (born 1984), Brazilian footballer
- Hermes Neves Soares (born 1974), Brazilian footballer
- Hiziel Souza Soares (born 1985), known as Soares, Brazilian footballer
- Irênio Soares (born 1975), Brazilian footballer
- Ivanildo Soares Cassamá (born 1986), Portuguese footballer
- João Soares da Mota Neto (born 1980), Brazilian footballer
- José Carlos Soares (1963–2018), Brazilian footballer
- Júlio César Soares Espíndola (born 1979), Brazilian footballer
- Louie Soares (born 1985), English footballer
- Luís Carlos Almada Soares (born 1986), Cape Verdean footballer
- Mario Soares (footballer) (born 1967), Indian footballer and manager
- Nani Soares (born 1991), Bissau-Guinean footballer
- Nuno Miguel Soares Pereira Ribeiro (born 1976), Portuguese footballer
- Paulo Jorge Soares Gomes (born 1980), Portuguese footballer
- Paulo Jorge Sousa Gomes (born 1975), Portuguese footballer
- Pepe Soares (1908–1931), Portuguese footballer
- Renan Brito Soares (born 1985), Brazilian footballer
- Ricardo Soares (born 1974), Portuguese footballer and manager
- Rodolfo Soares (born 1985), Brazilian footballer
- Ronaldo Soares Giovanelli (born 1967), Brazilian footballer
- Tiquinho Soares (born 1991), Brazilian footballer
- Tom Soares (born 1986), English footballer

=== Other sports related ===
- Bruno Soares (born 1982), Brazilian professional tennis player
- Diogo Soares (gymnast) (born 2002), Brazilian artistic gymnast
- Filipe Soares Franco (born 1953), Portuguese chairman of the football club Sporting Club de Portugal
- Joe Soares, American wheelchair rugby player
- John Soares (racing driver) (1918–2007), American racing driver
- John Soares Jr. (1942–2022), American racing driver
- Josh Soares (born 1982), Canadian professional ice hockey player
- Julia Soares (born 2005), Brazilian artistic gymnast
- Luis Soares (1964–2024), Portuguese-French long-distance runner
- Rui Soares (born 1993), Portuguese squash player
- Stephanie Soares (born 2001), Brazilian basketball player
- Tim Soares (born 1997), American-Brazilian basketball player for Ironi Ness Ziona of the Israeli Basketball Premier League
- Togo Renan Soares (1906–1992), Brazilian basketball coach

== Other ==
- Soares family, a Sephardic Jewish family who settled in Egypt
- National Museum Soares dos Reis, Portuguese museum
