= Afro-Brazilians =

Ethno-racial group in Brazil

Afro-brasileiros (Portuguese) Brasileiros negros (Portuguese)
- Proportion of pretos in each Brazilian municipality, with the exclusion of self-identified pardos, as of the 2022 Brazilian census

Total population
- ▲20,656,458 (2022 census) ▲10.17% of the Brazilian population

Regions with significant populations
- Entire country; highest percentages found in the Northeast and Southeast regions
- (São Paulo (state)) São Paulo: 3,546,562
- Bahia: 3,164,691
- (Rio de Janeiro (state)) Rio de Janeiro: 2,594,253
- Minas Gerais: 2,432,877
- Pernambuco: 909,557
- Maranhão: 854,424

Languages
- Brazilian Portuguese

Religion
- 49.0% Roman Catholic; 30.0% Protestant, 2.3% Afro-Brazilian religions, 1.5% Spiritist, 12.3% unaffiliated, 4.7% other

Related ethnic groups
- Other Afro-descendants in Latin America

Afro-Brazilians (Portuguese: Afro-brasileiros; pronounced [ˈafɾo bɾaziˈle(j)ɾus]), also known as Black Brazilians (Portuguese: Brasileiros negros), are Brazilians of total or predominantly Sub-Saharan African ancestry. Most multiracial Brazilians also have varying ranges of African ancestry. Brazilians whose African features are more evident are generally seen by others as Black and may identify themselves as such using the term preto, for instance. Those with less noticeable African features may not be seen as such, but nevertheless choose to identify themselves using the term pardo, negro, or afrodescendente. However, Brazilians rarely use the term "Afro-Brazilian" as a term of ethnic identity and never in informal discourse.

Preto ("black") and pardo ("brown/mixed") are among five ethnic categories used by the Brazilian Institute of Geography and Statistics (IBGE), along with branco ("white"), amarelo ("yellow", ethnic East Asian), and indígena (indigenous). In the 2022 census, 20.7 million Brazilians (10.2% of the population) identified as preto, while 92.1 million (45.3% of the population) identified as pardo, together making up 55.5% of Brazil's population. The term preto is usually used to refer to those with the darkest skin colour, so as a result of this many Brazilians of African descent identify themselves as pardos. The Brazilian Black Movement considers pretos and pardos together as part of a single category: negros (Blacks). In 2010, this perspective gained official recognition when the Brazilian Congress passed a law creating the Statute of Racial Equality. However, this definition is contested since a portion of pardos are acculturated indigenous people or people with indigenous and European rather than African ancestry, especially in Northern Brazil. A survey from 2002 revealed that if the pardo category were removed from the census, at least half of those identifying as pardo would instead choose to identify as black. Another survey from 2024 showed that only 40% of pardos consider themselves Black.

During the slavery period between the 16th and 19th centuries, Brazil received approximately four to five million Africans, who constituted about 40% of all Africans brought to the Americas. Many Africans who escaped slavery fled to quilombos, communities where they could live freely and resist oppression. In 1850, Brazil determined the definitive prohibition of the transatlantic slave trade and in 1888 the country abolished slavery, making it the last one in the Americas to do so. With the largest Afro-descendant population outside of Africa, Brazil's cultural, social, and economic landscape has been profoundly shaped by Afro-Brazilians. Their contributions are especially notable in sports, cuisine, literature, music, and dance, with elements like samba and capoeira reflecting their heritage. In contemporary times, Afro-Brazilians still face socioeconomic disparities and racial discrimination and continue the fight for racial equality and social justice.

== Brazilian census categories ==
Currently, the Brazilian Institute of Geography and Statistics (IBGE) uses five race or color categories in the census: branca (white), parda (brown/mixed), preta (black), amarela (yellow, ethnic East Asian) and indígena (indigenous). In the 1940 census, all individuals who did not identify as "white", "black" or "yellow" were subsequently aggregated into the category "pardo". In other words, people who identified as pardo, moreno, mulato, caboclo, indigenous, among others, were classified as "pardos". In subsequent censuses, pardo was formalized as its own category, while Indigenous peoples gained a separate category only in 1991.

Pardo literally translates to brown, but it can also refer to racial mixture. Activists and scholars associated with the Brazilian Black movement argue that the inclusion of this category in the census distorts Brazil's demographic depiction. They contend that the ideological privileging of whiteness in Brazilian society leads many Brazilians to 'deny their blackness' and 'lighten' themselves on the census by choosing the pardo category. Critics also claim that this distinction encourages Brazilians to separate the Afro-descendant population based on physical appearance, hindering the development of a unified Black identity in Brazil. Many black movement actors prefer the term negro, defining it as the sum of individuals who self-classify as brown (pardo) and black (preto) in the census. Many scholars and social scientists have also combined the brown and black categories in their studies, using terms such as Afro-descendente, Afro-Brazilian, or negro.

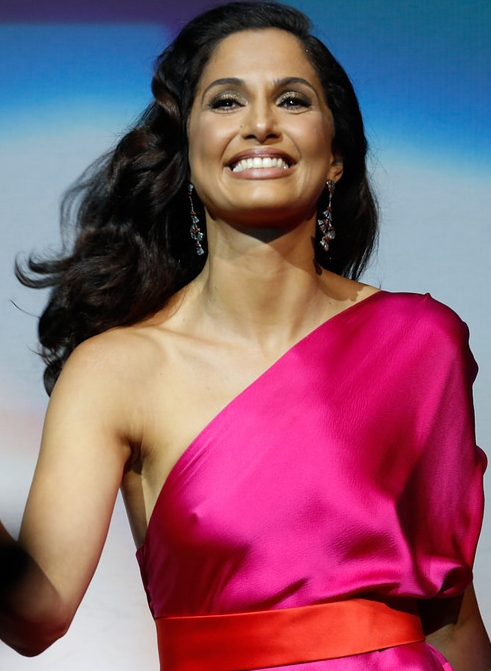
Actress Camila Pitanga self-identifies as black, but only 27% of Brazilians consider her as such and 36% view her as parda, according to a Datafolha survey.

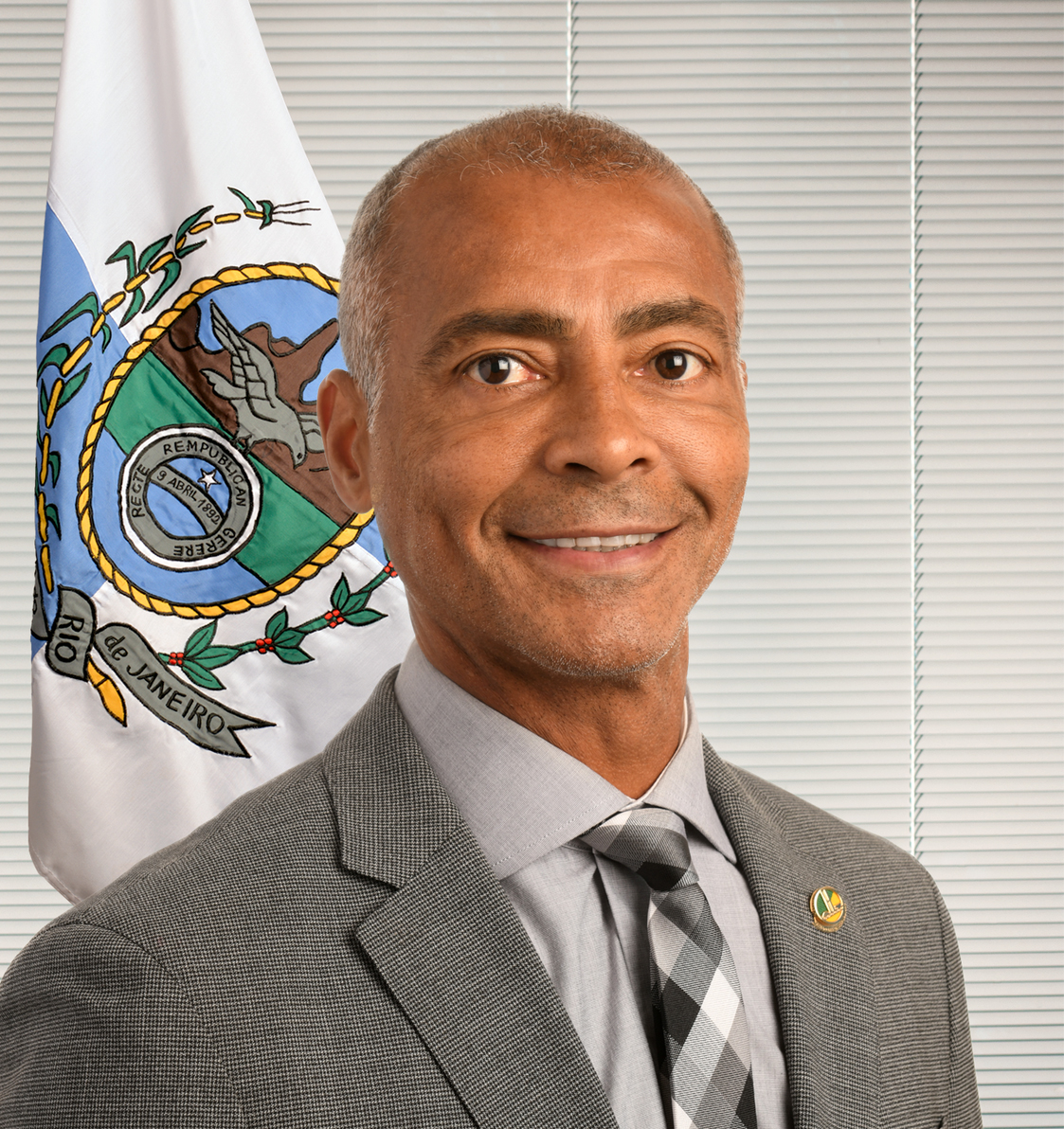
Former football player Romário is seen as pardo by 51% of Brazilians and as Black by 31%, according to a Datafolha survey.

In 2010, the Brazilian Congress passed the Estatuto da Igualdade Racial (Statute of Racial Equality). The law adopts the racial term negro to refer to individuals who self-identify as black and brown according to the IBGE race or color classification. Although evidence suggests that blacks and browns have similar socio-economic profiles and indicators of material well-being compared to whites, some researchers note that it is problematic to collapse pretos and pardos into a collective black category because some Brazilians who self-identify as pardo are of mixed European and indigenous ancestry, not African. A survey conducted in the early 2000s with a sample of 2,364 people from 102 municipalities showed that if the "brown" category were removed and Brazilians had to choose between "black" or "white", the population would appear 68% white and 32% black. In this binary format, 44% of those identifying as brown would choose the white category. According to a 2000 survey held in Rio de Janeiro, the entire self-reported preto population reported to have African ancestry. 86% of the self-reported pardo and 38% of the self-reported white population reported to have African ancestors. It is notable that 14% of the pardos from Rio de Janeiro said they have no African ancestors. This percentage may be even higher in Northern Brazil, where there was a greater ethnic contribution from Amerindian populations.

The fusion of pretos and pardos into negros tends to be validated by the mainstream media, official bodies such as the Institute of Applied Economic Research (IPEA), ministries, government departments, and international organizations. However, not all people who identify as pardos are of African descent, especially in Northern Brazil, and identify with Blackness. Sociologist Demétrio Magnoli considers classifying all pretos and pardos as Blacks as an assault on the racial vision of Brazilians. Sociologist Simon Schwartzman points out that to "substitute negro for preto, suppressing the pardo alternative would mean to impose unto Brazil a vision of the racial issue as a dichotomy, similar to that of the United States, which would not be true." Members of the black movement in Brazil seek to define their racial identity in political and socioeconomic terms; pardos are grouped with blacks based on shared realities of racial discrimination rather than merely as a result of having "a drop of black blood." Research by Hasenbalg and Silva (1983) indicates that sociological racism is the primary factor uniting blacks and pardos.

Two IBGE surveys, the 1976 National Household Sample Survey (PNAD) and the July 1998 Monthly Employment Survey (PME), have been analyzed to assess how Brazilians think of themselves in racial terms. The results of these surveys show that a great number of racial terms are in use in Brazil, but most of these terms are used by small numbers of people. Edward Telles notes that 95% of the population used only six different terms (branco, moreno, (Note: Said of, or someone who has black hair and slightly dark skin; of the colour of ripe wheat. / In Brazil, an ironic or euphemistic designation given to blacks and mulattos.) pardo, moreno-claro, preto and negro). Petruccelli shows that the seven most common responses (the above plus amarela) sum up 97% of responses, and the 10 most common (the previous plus mulata, clara, and morena-escura – dark brunette) make 99%. Racial classifications in Brazil are based primarily on skin color and on other physical characteristics such as facial features, hair texture, etc. This is a poor scientific indication of ancestry, because only a few genes are responsible for someone's skin color: a person who is considered White may have more African ancestry than a person who is considered Black, and vice versa. But, as race is a social construct, these classifications relate to how people are perceived and perceive themselves in society. In Brazil, class and economic status also affect how individuals are perceived.

In Brazil, it is possible for two siblings of different colors to be classified as people of different races. Children who are born to a black mother and a European father would be classified as black if their features read more as African, and classified as white if their features appeared more European. The Brazilian emphasis on physical appearance rather than ancestry is evident from a large survey in which less than 10% of Brazilian black individuals cited Africa as one of their origins when allowed to provide multiple responses. In the July 1998 PME, the categories Afro-Brasileiro ("Afro-Brazilian") and Africano Brasileiro ("African Brazilian") were not used at all; the category Africano ("African") was used by 0.004% of the respondents. In the 1976 PNAD, none of these terms was used even once.

Lighter-skinned mulattoes (who obviously were descendants of some Europeans) were easily integrated into the white population. Through years of integration and racial assimilation, a white Brazilian population has developed with more historic African ancestry, as well as a black population with European ancestry. In the United States, the efforts to enforce white supremacy resulted in southern states adopting a one-drop rule at the turn of the 20th century, so that people with any known African ancestry were automatically classified as Black, regardless of skin color. In the 21st century, many Black Americans have some degree of European ancestry, while few white Americans have African ancestry.

== History ==
=== Slavery ===
The first Spaniards and Portuguese explorers in the Americas initially enslaved Amerindian populations. In the case of the Portuguese, the weakness of the political systems of the Tupi-Guarani Amerindian groups they conquered on the Brazilian coastline, and the inexperience of these Amerindians with systematic peasant labor, made them easy to exploit through non-coercive labor arrangements. However, several factors prevented the system of Amerindian slavery from being sustained in Brazil. For example, Native American populations were not numerous or accessible enough to meet all demands of the settlers for labor. In many cases, exposure to European diseases caused high levels of mortality among the Amerindian population, to such an extent that workers became scarce. Historians estimate that about 30,000 Amerindians under the rule of the Portuguese died in a smallpox epidemic in the 1560s. The Iberian conquerors could not attract sufficient settlers from their own countries to the colonies and, after 1570, they began increasingly to bring enslaved people who had been kidnapped in Africa as a primary labor force.

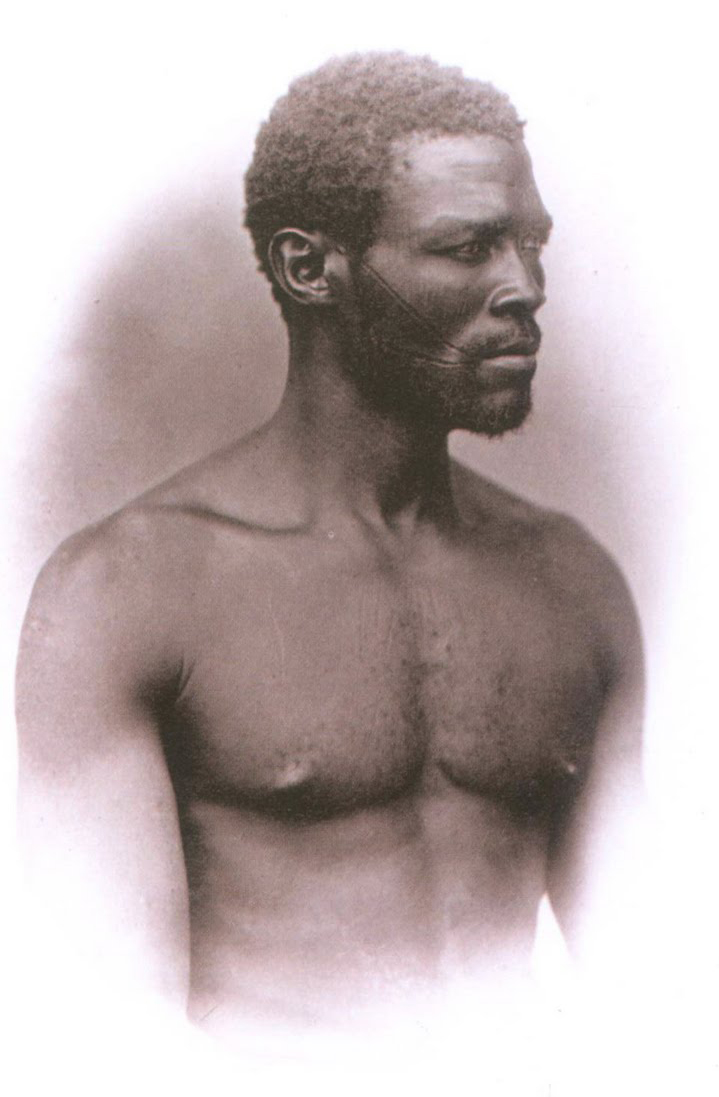
Slave from Brazil photographed by Augusto Stahl (c. 1865)

Over nearly three centuries from the late 1500s to the 1860s, Brazil was consistently the largest destination for African slaves in the Americas. In that period, approximately 4.9 million enslaved Africans were imported to Brazil. Brazilian slavery included a diverse range of labor roles. For example, gold mining in Brazil began to grow around 1690 in interior regions of Brazil, such as the modern-day region of Minas Gerais. Slaves in Brazil also worked on sugar plantations, such as those found in the Captaincy of Pernambuco. Other products of slave labor in Brazil during that era in Brazilian history included tobacco, textiles, and cachaça, which were often vital items traded in exchange for slaves on the African continent.

The nature of the work that slaves did had a direct effect on aspects of slaves' lives, such as life expectancy and family formation. An example from an early inventory of African slaves (1569–71) from the plantation of Sergipe do Conde in Bahia shows that he owned nineteen males and one female. These uneven gender-ratios combined with the high mortality rate related to the physical duress that working in a mine or on a sugar plantation (for example) could have on a slave's body. The effect was often that many New World slave economies, including Brazil, relied on a constant importation of new slaves to replace those who had died.

With Brazil's proximity to Africa, it was easy for the Portuguese to continue transporting Africans to Brazil when enslaved people ran away or died. Not all Africans and their descendants were enslaved; some were free and others were able to buy their freedom by earning money for their services. Despite the changes in the slave population demographic related to the constant importation of slaves through the 1860s, a creole generation in the African population emerged in Brazil. By 1800, Brazil had the largest single population of African and creole slaves in any one colony in the American continent.

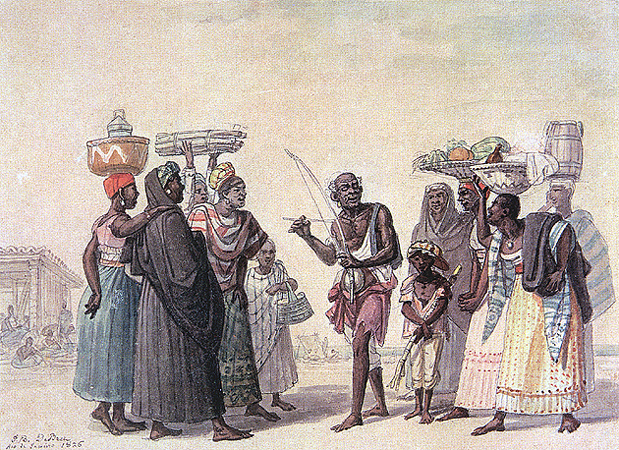
Berimbau player, by Jean-Baptiste Debret, 1826

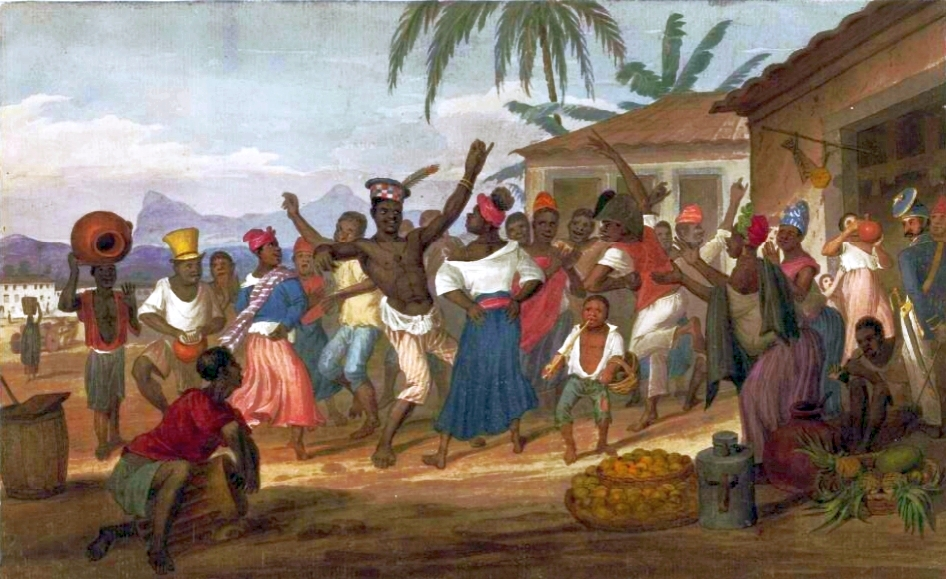
Afro-Brazilians dancing a jongo, c. 1822

African disembarkments in Brazil, from 1500 to 1855
Period	1500–1700	1701–1760	1761–1829	1830–1855
Numbers	510,000	958,000	1,720,000	618,000

In Africa, about 40% of Blacks died on the route between the areas of capture and the African coast. Another 15% died in the ships crossing the Atlantic Ocean between Africa and Brazil. From the Atlantic coast, the journey could take from 33 to 43 days. From Mozambique it could take as many as 76 days. Once in Brazil, from 10 to 12% of the slaves also died in the places where they were taken to be bought by their future masters. In consequence, only 45% of the Africans captured in Africa to become slaves in Brazil survived. Darcy Ribeiro estimated that, in this process, some 12 million Africans were captured to be brought to Brazil, even though the majority of them died before becoming slaves in the country. The African slaves in Brazil were known to have suffered various types of physical violence. Lashes on the back were the most common repressive measure. About 40 lashes per day were common and they prevented the mutilation of slaves. The colonial chroniclers recorded the extreme violence and sadism of White women against female slaves, usually due to jealousy or to prevent a relationship between their husbands and the slaves.

=== Origins of Afro-Brazilians ===
Major slave trading regions of Africa, 15th–19th centuries

The Trans-Atlantic Slave Trade Database project estimated that, during the slave trade, 4,821,126 Africans disembarked in Brazil. After thorough analyses in Africa and the Americas, researchers were able to trace the origins of the Africans brought to Brazil. About 70% of the slaves disembarked in Brazil came from Central-Western Africa. Today, this region includes the countries of Angola, the Republic of the Congo, and the Democratic Republic of the Congo.

Origin of Africans brought to Brazil
Region of origin	Number of people	Percentage	Countries in the current region
West Central Africa	3,377,870	70.1%	Angola, Republic of the Congo and the Democratic Republic of the Congo
Bight of Benin	867,945	17.9%	Benin, Togo and western Nigeria
Southeast Africa and Indian Ocean Islands	276,441	5.7%	Mozambique and Madagascar
Senegambia	108,114	2.2%	Senegal,Gambia and Guinea-Bissau
Bight of Biafra	114,651	2.4%	Eastern part of Nigeria, Cameroon, Equatorial Guinea and Gabon
Gold Coast	61,624	1.3%	Ghana and western Ivory Coast
Sierra Leone	8,320	0.2%	Sierra Leone
Windward Coast	6,161	0.1%	Liberia and Ivory Coast
Totals	4,821,126		

The Africans brought to Brazil belonged to two major groups: the West African and the Bantu people. The West Africans mostly belong to the Yoruba people, who became known as the "nagô". The word derives from ànàgó, a term used by the Dahomey to refer to Yoruba-speaking people. The Dahomey enslaved and sold a large number of Yoruba people, largely of Oyo heritage. Consequently, Yoruba slaves in Brazil were given the label nago as an ethnic marker. Slaves descended from the Yoruba are strongly associated with the Candomblé religious tradition. Other slaves from the Bight of Benin belonged to the Fon people and other neighboring ethnic groups such as the Ewe, Aja, and Mina. Bantu people were mostly brought from present-day Angola and the Congo, most belonging to the Bakongo or Ambundu ethnic groups. Bantu slaves were also taken from coastal Mozambique, who were largely Makua people. They were sent in large scale to Rio de Janeiro, Minas Gerais. The Yoruba and other peoples from the Bight of Benin (such as the Fon, Ewe, Aja, and Mina) were sent, as far as Northeastern Brazil, particularly Bahia.

Gilberto Freyre noted the major differences between enslaved African ethnic groups. Some West-African groups, such as Hausa, Fula, Wolof, and Mandinka, were Islamic, spoke Arabic, and many of them could also read and write in this language. Muslim slaves were brought from northern Mozambique. Freyre noted that many enslaved Africans were better educated than their masters, because many Muslim slaves were literate in Arabic, while many Portuguese Brazilian masters could not read or write in Portuguese. Due to their relations with lslamized ethnic groups via the Trans-Saharan Trade and the increased Islamization of Yorubaland in the 19th century, many Yoruba had been converted to Islam. Therefore, Yoruba slaves brought to Brazil consisted of both Muslim and non-Muslim traditional practitioners (who were the majority). These slaves with a greater Arab and Berber influence were largely sent to Bahia. These Muslim slaves, known as Malê in Brazil, produced one of the greatest slave revolts in the Americas, known as the Malê Revolt, when in 1835 they tried to take control of Salvador, until then the largest city of the American continent.

Despite the large influx of Islamic slaves, most of the slaves in Brazil were brought from the Bantu regions of the Atlantic coast of Africa where today Congo and Angola are located, and also from Mozambique. These people lived in tribes, kingdoms or city-states, with distinct cultural and societal attributes which they brought to Brazil, allowing them to survive in Afro-Brazilian culture. The Bakongo, for example, had developed agriculture, raised livestock, domesticated animals such as goats, pigs, chickens and dogs, and produced wooden sculptures. Some groups from Angola were nomadic and did not know agriculture, while others like the Mbundu (or Ambundu) were very skilled warriors and brought their fighting ability (such as Capoeira) to Brazil, which aided them in slave revolts.

=== Abolition of slavery ===
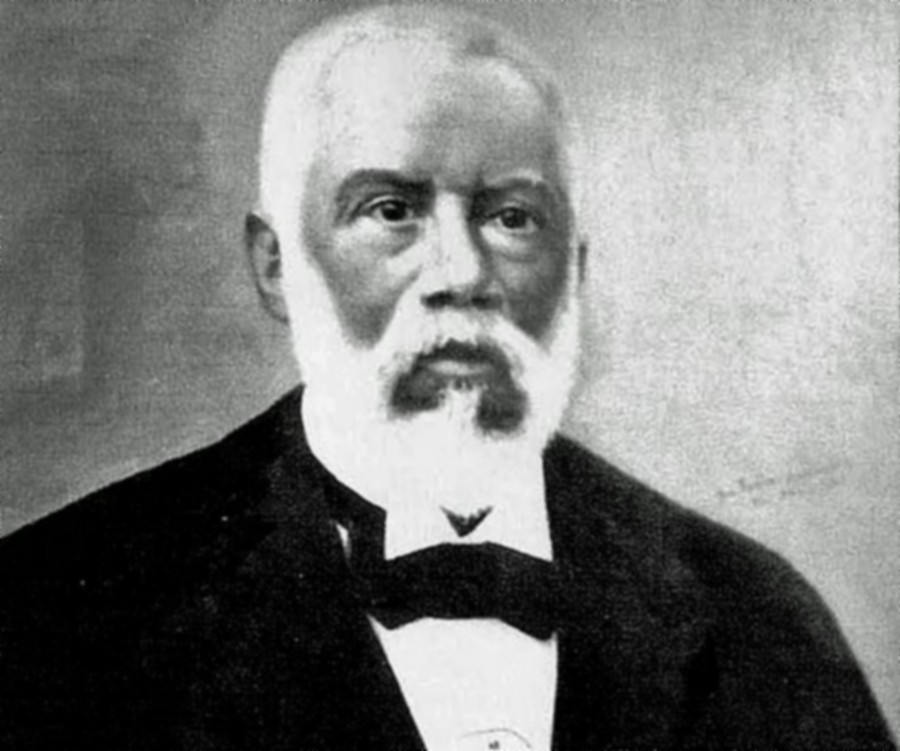
Francisco Paulo de Almeida (1826–1901), first and only Baron of Guaraciaba, title granted by Princess Isabel. Black, he possessed one of the greatest fortunes of the imperial period, owning approximately one thousand slaves.

According to Petrônio Domingues, by 1887, the slave struggles pointed to a real possibility of widespread insurrection. On 23 October, in São Paulo, for instance, there were violent confrontations between the police and rioting Blacks, who chanted "long live freedom" and "death to the slaveowners". The president of the province, Rodrigues Alves, reported the situation as following:

The massive flight of slaves from several fazendas threatens, in some places in the province, public order, alarming the proprietaries and the productive classes.

Uprisings erupted in Itu, Campinas, Indaiatuba, Amparo, Piracicaba and Capivari; ten thousand fugitive slaves grouped in Santos. Flights were happening in daylight, guns were spotted among the fugitives, who, instead of hiding from police, seemed ready to engage in confrontation.

It was as a response to such situation that, on 13 May 1888, slavery was abolished, as a means to restore order and the control of the ruling class, in a situation in which the slave system was almost completely disorganised.

As an abolitionist newspaper, O Rebate, put it, ten years later,

Had the slaves not fled en masse from the plantations, rebelling against their masters ... Had they not, more than 20,000 of them, gone to the famous quilombo of Jabaquara (out of Santos, itself a center of abolitionist agitation), then maybe they would still be slaves today ... Slavery ended because slaves no longer wanted to be slaves, because slaves rebelled against their masters and against the law that enslaved them ... The law of 13 May was nothing more than the legal recognition – so as not to discredit public authority – of an act that had already been accomplished by the mass revolt of slaves.

=== Modern history ===
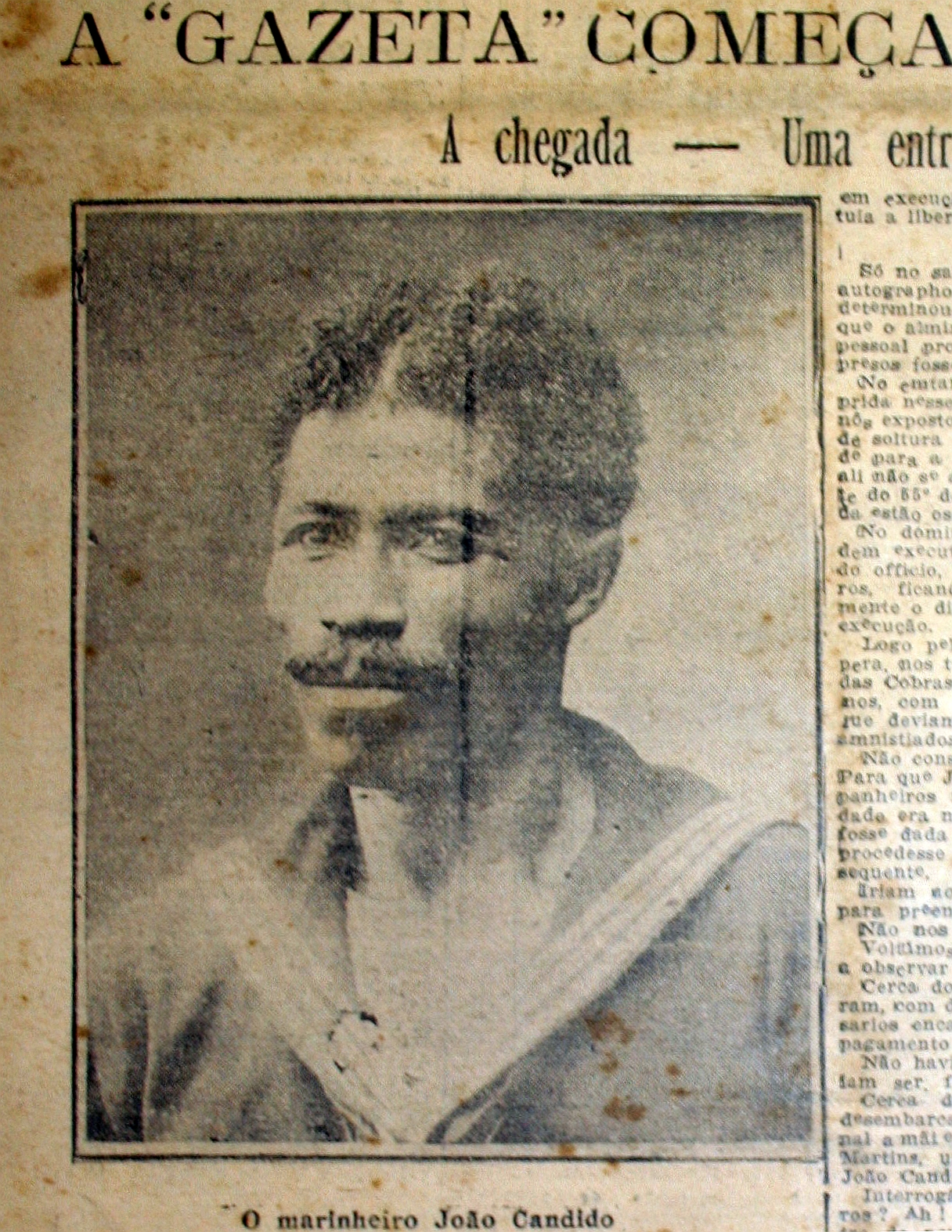
Leader of the Chibata Revolt, João Cândido, on the front page of the Gazeta de Notícias newspaper

One year after the abolition of slavery, the Republic was proclaimed in Brazil, in 1889. However, the new political regime did not bring significant material or symbolic gains for the Black population. Instead, Afro-descendants remained marginalized in various ways: politically, due to the limitations of the new system regarding suffrage and other forms of civic participation; socially and symbolically, through the spread of scientific racism doctrines and the whitening theory; and economically, because of the preference given to European immigrants in access to the labor market. Political elites in Brazil actively promoted European immigration to "whiten" the population, banning African and Asian immigration in 1891. To incentivize European immigration, the federal government subsidized travel to Brazil until 1927. European and white Brazilian workers were favored in factory jobs over Brazilians of African descent, who were often relegated to domestic and plantation labor. Afro-Brazilians established their own social and cultural institutions to support each other. In Salvador, they founded religious brotherhoods like Rosário às Portas do Carmo (1888–1938). The Sociedade Protectora dos Desvalidos, created in 1832, was an early mutual aid society for Afro-Brazilians. There were also religiously affiliated groups led by Afro-Brazilian women, such as the Irmãndade de Boa Morte in Bahia. Facing exclusion from white social clubs, Afro-Brazilians formed their own organizations, including the Luvas Pretas in 1904 and the Palmares Civic Center in 1927, which served as a library and meeting place.

Afro-Brazilians challenged racial exclusion through cultural and political movements. Notably, in 1928, they protested a decree barring them from enlisting in the São Paulo Civil Guard. The Brazilian Black Front (Frente Negra Brasileira), Brazil's first black political party, was founded in 1931 to fight racism but was disbanded six years later during Getúlio Vargas's New State period (1937–1945), which restricted political activities. Although this period was repressive, Vargas's 1931 Law of Naturalization of Labor, favoring Brazilian-born workers over European immigrants, garnered some Afro-Brazilian support for him. Before the 1940s, Afro-Brazilians also created their own newspapers and dance groups, with a small black elite leading intellectual thought in São Paulo's Black Press.

== Demographics ==
Evolution of the Brazilian population
according skin color: 1872–1991

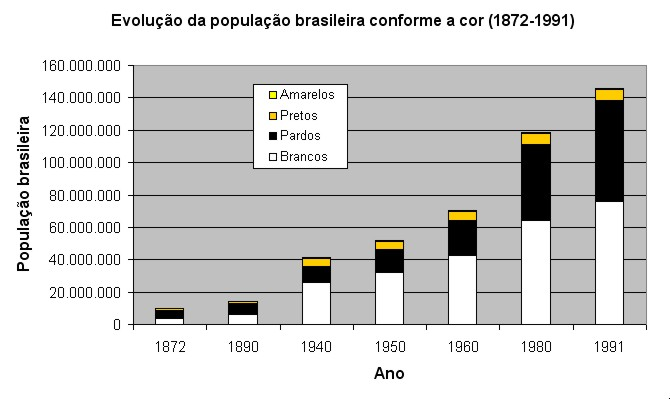
Population growth White people in white color Pardos in black Black in yellow Asians are very few

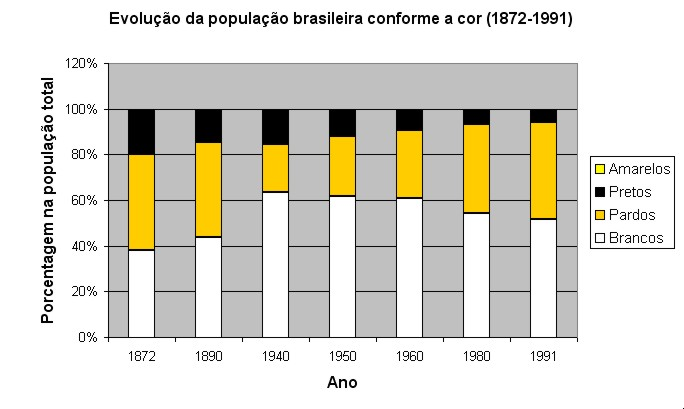
Percentual in overall population White people in white Pardos in yellow Black in black Asians are very few

African Brazilians 1872–2022
Year	Population	% of Brazil
1872	1,954,452	19.68%
1890	2,097,426	▼14.63%
1940	6,035,869	▲14.64%
1950	5,692,657	▼10.96%
1960	6,116,848	▼8.71%
1980	7,046,906	▼5.92%
1991	7,335,136	▼5.00%
2000	10,554,336	▲6.21%
2010	14,517,961	▲7.61%
2022	20,656,458	▲10.17%
Source: Brazilian census

Before abolition, the growth of the black population was mainly due to the acquisition of new slaves from Africa. In Brazil, the black population had a negative growth. This was due to the low life expectancy of the slaves, which was around seven years. It was also because of the imbalance between the number of men and women. The vast majority of slaves were men, black women being a minority. Slaves rarely had a family and the unions between the slaves was hampered due to incessant hours of work. Another very important factor was that black women were held by white and mixed-race men. The Portuguese colonization, largely composed of men with very few women resulted in a social context in which white men disputed indigenous or African women.

According to Darcy Ribeiro the process of miscegenation between whites and blacks in Brazil, in contrast to an idealized racial democracy and a peaceful integration, was a process of sexual domination, in which the white man imposed an unequal relationship using violence because of his prime condition in society. As an official wife or as a concubine or subjected to a condition of sexual slave, the black woman was the responsible for the growth of the "parda" population. The non-White population has grown mainly through sexual intercourse between the black female slave and the Portuguese master, which, together with assortative mating, explains the high degree of European ancestry in the black Brazilian population and the high degree of African ancestry in the white population.

Historian Manolo Florentino refutes the idea that a large part of the Brazilian people is a result of the forced relationship between the rich Portuguese colonizer and the Amerindian or African slaves. According to him, most of the Portuguese settlers in Brazil were poor adventurers from Northern Portugal who immigrated to Brazil alone. Most of them were men (the proportion was eight or nine men for each woman) and then it was natural that they had relationships with the Amerindian or Black women. According to him the mixture of races in Brazil, more than a sexual domination of the rich Portuguese master over the poor slaves, was a mixture between the poor Portuguese settlers with the Amerindian and Black women.

The Brazilian population of more evident black physiognomy is more strongly present along the coast, due to the high concentration of slaves working on sugar cane plantations. Another region that had a strong presence of Africans was the mining areas in the center of Brazil. Freyre wrote that the states with strongest African presence were Bahia and Minas Gerais, but that there is no region in Brazil where the black people have not penetrated. Many blacks fled to the hinterland of Brazil, including the Northern region, and met Amerindian and Mameluco populations. Many of these acculturated blacks were accepted in these communities and taught them the Portuguese language and the European culture. In these areas the blacks were "agents for transmitting European culture" to those isolated communities in Brazil. Many blacks mixed with the Amerindian and caboclo women.

In the second half of the 20th century, Brazil saw a marked increase in the number of people self-identifying as "brown" in national censuses. Research shows that this shift was not driven by demographic forces such as differences in fertility, mortality, or migration rates. Instead, it resulted largely from individuals changing their racial self-identification over time—from "black" or "white" to "brown." Between 1950 and 1991, the proportion of Brazilians self-identifying as "brown" rose from 26% to 43%, while those identifying as "black" declined from 11% to 5%, and "white" from 62% to 52%. This demographic "browning" of the population aligns with the ideology of racial democracy. Advocates of this narrative argue that, despite Brazil's colonial history of African enslavement, cultural mixing and miscegenation fostered a sense of shared ancestry and national identity. The consolidation of this ideology in Brazilian popular culture over the course of the 20th century might explain the increase in the number of individuals self-identifying as brown. Another explanation for this shift lies in the persistent social stigma attached to blackness in Brazil. Carl Degler (1986) argues that individuals who achieve upward social mobility tend to reclassify themselves from "black" to "brown"—a process he called the "flight from blackness." Given the intensive industrialization and economic growth of the Brazilian economy during the 1960s and 1970s, this phenomenon might partially explain why, in relative terms, the "black" category lost a much larger share of individuals than the "white" category. Between 1950 and 1980, the "white" category declined by 7%, while the "black" category fell by 38%.

=== Geographic distribution ===
==== By region and state ====
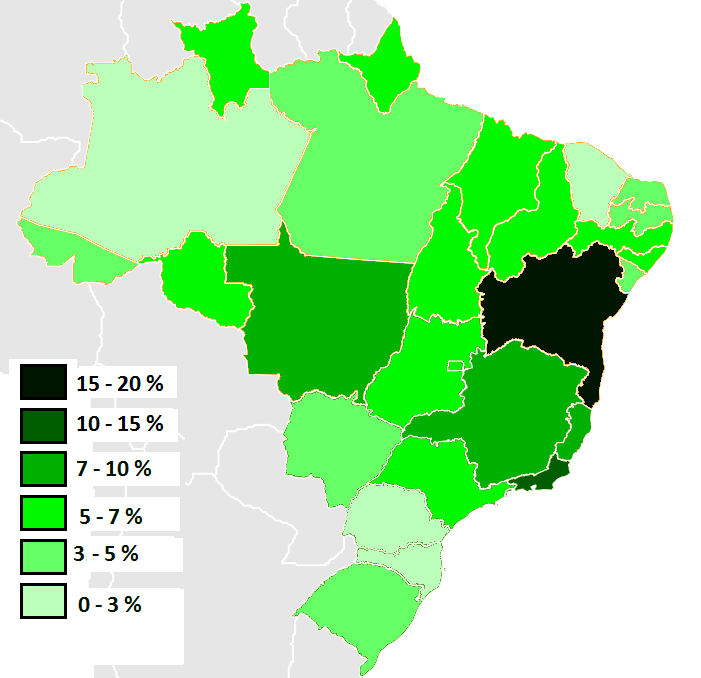
Percentage of black Brazilians per state, 2009.

The Northeast region has the highest proportion of self-identified Black Brazilians, comprising 13.0% of its population. It is followed by the Southeast at 10.6%, the Central-West at 9.1%, the North at 8.8%, and the South at 5.0%. In absolute numbers, the Southeast has the largest self-identified Black population, with 9,003,372 individuals, while the Northeast has 7,127,018. Together, the Southeast and Northeast account for 78.08% of Black Brazilians. The North ranks third with 1,530,418 Black Brazilians, followed by the South with 1,505,526, and the Central-West with 1,490,124.

% Black Brazilians	Rank	Federative units of Brazil	Afro Brazilian population
22.38%	1	Bahia	3,164,691
16.16%	2	Rio de Janeiro	2,594,253
13.19%	3	Tocantins	199,394
12.85%	4	Sergipe	283,960
12.61%	5	Maranhão	854,424
12.25%	6	Piauí	400,662
11.84%	7	Minas Gerais	2,432,877
11.81%	8	Amapá	86,662
11.21%	9	Espírito Santo	429,680
10.71%	10	Distrito Federal	301,765
10.04%	11	Pernambuco	909,557
9.86%	12	Mato Grosso	360,698
9.77%	13	Pará	793,621
9.55%	14	Alagoas	298,709
9.19%	15	Goiás	648,560
9.17%	16	Rio Grande do Norte	302,749
8.65%	17	Rondônia	136,793
8.56%	18	Acre	71,086
7.99%	19	São Paulo	3,546,562
7.96%	20	Paraíba	316,572
7.73%	21	Roraima	49,195
6.77%	22	Ceará	595,694
6.52%	23	Rio Grande do Sul	709,837
6.50%	24	Mato Grosso do Sul	179,101
4.91%	25	Amazonas	193,667
4.24%	26	Paraná	485,781
4.07%	27	Santa Catarina	309,908

==== By municipality ====
As of 2022, the city of São Paulo has the largest self-identified Black population in Brazil, with 1,160,073 individuals identifying as pretos. It is followed by Rio de Janeiro with 968,428, Salvador with 825,509, Belo Horizonte with 312,920, Brasília with 301,765, Recife with 182,546, Feira de Santana with 180,190, Fortaleza with 171,018, Porto Alegre with 168,196, and São Luís with 167,885.

The 2022 census revealed that the brown population was the majority in 3,245 municipalities (58.3% of the total), while the self-identified black population was the majority in nine. More than half of the municipalities with a brown majority and all with a black majority are in the Northeast region of Brazil. With over 80% of its population being Afro-descendant, Salvador is considered the blackest city in the world outside the African continent.

==== Quilombos ====
The quilombola population in Brazil is 1,327,802 people, or 0.65% of the total population. The Northeast Region has 5,386 quilombola localities, 64% of the total. Bahia accounts for 29.90% of the quilombola population, followed by Maranhão, with 20.26%. Together, the two states are home to 50.16% of the country's quilombola population.

== Genetic studies ==
Genetic origin of Afro-Brazilian population (Perc.% rounded values)
Line	Origin	Negros (Black)
Maternal (mtDNA)	African	85%
Maternal (mtDNA)	European	2.5%
Maternal (mtDNA)	Native Brazilian	12.5%
Paternal (Y chromosome)	African	48%
Paternal (Y chromosome)	European	50%
Paternal (Y chromosome)	Native Brazilian	1.6%

The research analysed the mitochondrial DNA (mtDNA), which is present in all human beings and passed down with only minor mutations through the maternal line. The other is the Y chromosome, which is present only in males and is passed down with only minor mutations through the paternal line. Both can show from what part of the world a matrilineal or patrilineal ancestor of a person came from, but one can have in mind that they are only a fraction of the human genome, and reading ancestry from Y chromosome and mtDNA only tells 1/23rd the story, since humans have 23 chromosome pairs in the cellular DNA.

Analysing the Y chromosome, which comes from male ancestors through the paternal line, it was concluded that half (50%) of Brazilian "negros" Y chromosomes come from Europe, 48% come from Africa and 1.6% come from Native Americans. Analysing their mitochondrial DNA, that comes from female ancestors though maternal line, 85% of them come from Africa, 12.5% come from Native Americans and 2.5% come from Europe. The high level of European ancestry in African Brazilians through paternal line exists because, for much of Brazil's history, there were more Caucasian males than Caucasian females. So inter-racial relationships between Caucasian males and African or Native American females were widespread.

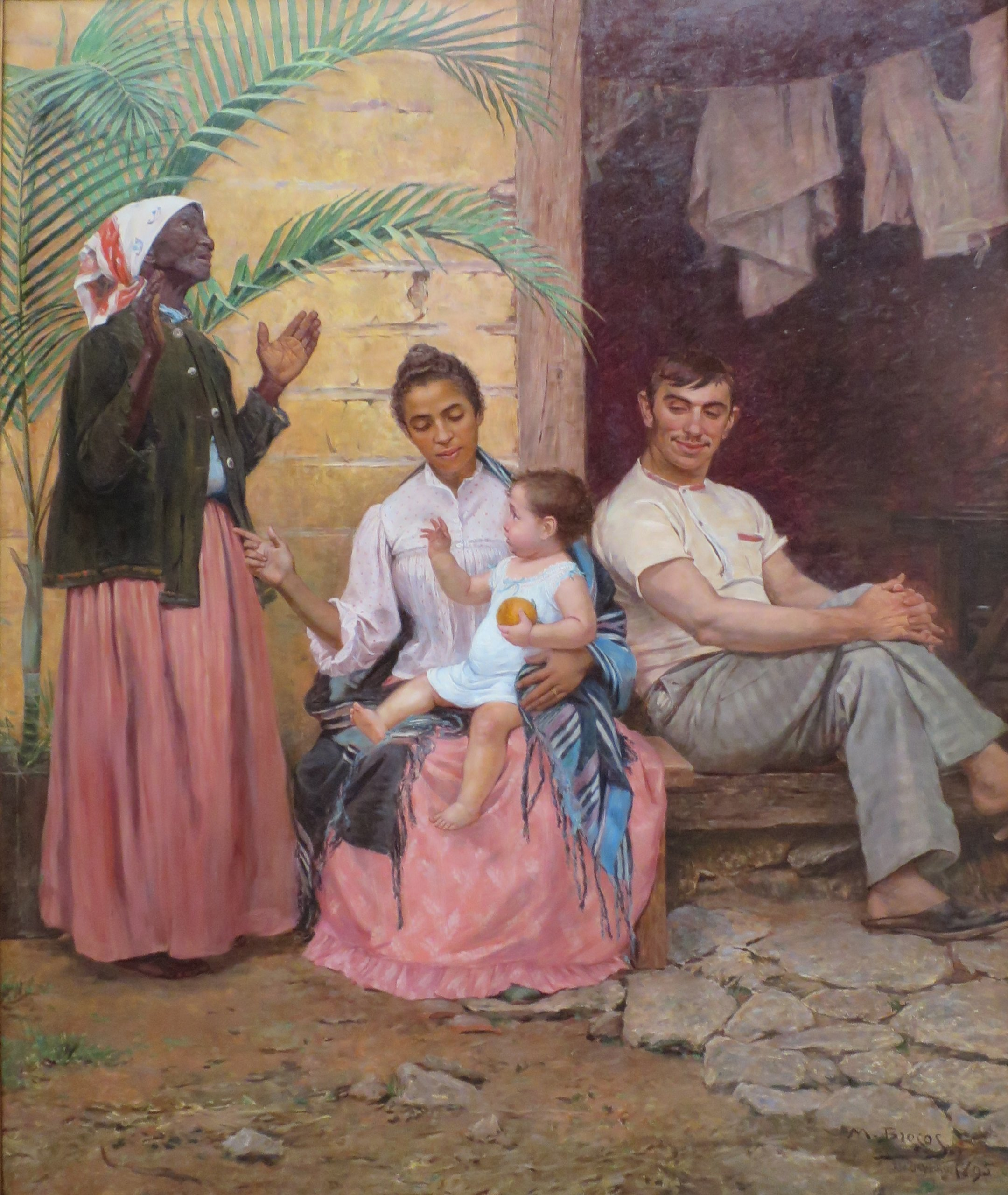
Portrait "A Redenção de Cam" (1895), by Galician painter Modesto Brocos showing a Brazilian family each generation becoming "whiter".

Over 75% of Caucasians from North and Northeastern Brazil would have over 10% African genes, according to this particular study. Even in Southeastern and Southern Brazil, regions which received large waves of European immigration beginning in the 1820s and growing strongly in the late 19th century, 49% of the Caucasian population would have over 10% African genes, according to that study. Thus, 86% of Brazilians would have at least 10% of genes that came from Africa. The researchers however, were cautious about their conclusions: "Obviously these estimates were made by extrapolation of experimental results with relatively small samples and, therefore, their confidence limits are very ample". An autosomal study from 2011, also led by Sérgio Pena, but with nearly 1000 samples this time, from all over the country, shows that in most Brazilian regions most Brazilians "whites" are less than 10% African in ancestry, and it also shows that the "pardos" are predominantly European in ancestry, the European ancestry being therefore the main component in the Brazilian population, in spite of a very high degree of African ancestry and significant Native American contribution. Other autosomal studies show a European predominance in the Brazilian population.

A 1981 study of blood polymorphisms examined 1,000 people from Porto Alegre in Southern Brazil and 760 from Natal in Northeastern Brazil. It found that people identified as White in Porto Alegre had 8% African ancestry, while those in Natal had a mix of 58% White, 25% Black, and 17% Amerindian ancestry. The study also showed that individuals identified as White or Pardo in Natal have a dominant European ancestry, while those identified as White in Porto Alegre have an overwhelming majority of European ancestry. According to an autosomal DNA genetic study from 2011, both "whites" and "pardos" from Fortaleza have a predominant degree of European ancestry (>70%), with minor but important African and Native American contributions. "Whites" and "pardos" from Belém and Ilhéus also were found to be predominantly European in ancestry, with minor Native American and African contributions.

Genomic ancestry of individuals in Porto Alegre Sérgio Pena et al. 2011 .
colour	Amerindian	African	European
white	9.3%	5.3%	85.5%
pardo	11.4%	44.4%	44.2%
black	11%	45.9%	43.1%
total	9.6%	12.7%	77.7%

Genomic ancestry of individuals in Fortaleza Sérgio Pena et al. 2011 .
colour	Amerindian	African	European
white	10.9%	13.3%	75.8%
pardo	12.8%	14.4%	72.8%
black	N.S.	N.S.	N.S

According to another study conducted at a school in the poor periphery of Rio de Janeiro, autosomal DNA study (from 2009), the "pardos" there were found to be on average over 80% European, and the "whites" were found to carry very little Amerindian and/or African admixtures. In general, the test results showed that European ancestry is far more important than the students thought it would be. The "blacks" (pretos) of the periphery of Rio de Janeiro, according to this study, thought of themselves as predominantly African before the study and yet they turned out predominantly European (at 52%), the African contribution at 41% and the Native American 7%. According to another autosomal DNA study, those who identified as Whites in Rio de Janeiro turned out to have 86.4% – and self identified pardos 68.1% – European ancestry on average (autosomal). Pretos were found out to have on average 41.8% European ancestry.

An autosomal study from 2011 has also concluded that European ancestry is the predominant ancestry in Brazil, accounting for nearly 70% of the ancestry of the population. European ancestry ranged from 60.6% in the Northeast to 77.7% in the South. The 2011 autosomal study samples came from blood donors, public health personnel and health students. Brazilian homogeneity is, therefore, greater within regions than between them:

Region	European	African	Native American
Northern Brazil	68.80%	10.50%	18.50%
Northeast of Brazil	60.10%	29.30%	8.90%
Southeast Brazil	74.20%	17.30%	7.30%
Southern Brazil	79.50%	10.30%	9.40%

A 2015 autosomal genetic study, which also analyzed data of 25 studies of 38 different Brazilian populations, concluded that: European ancestry accounts for 62% of the heritage of the population, followed by the African (21%) and the Native American (17%). The European contribution is highest in Southern Brazil (77%), the African contribution is the highest in Northeast Brazil (27%) and the Native American contribution is the highest in Northern Brazil (32%).

Region	European	African	Native American
North Region	51%	16%	32%
Northeast Region	58%	27%	15%
Central-West Region	64%	24%	12%
Southeast Region	67%	23%	10%
South Region	77%	12%	11%

According to another study from 2008, by the University of Brasília, European ancestry dominates in the whole of Brazil in all regions, accounting for 65,90% of the heritage of the population, followed by the African contribution (24,80%) and the Native American (9,3%). According to an autosomal DNA study (from 2003) focused on the composition of the Brazilian population as a whole, "European contribution [...] is highest in the South (81% to 82%), and lowest in the North (68% to 71%). The African component is lowest in the South (11%), while the highest values are found in the Southeast (18%–20%). Extreme values for the Amerindian fraction were found in the South and Southeast (7%–8%) and North (17%–18%)". The researchers were cautious with the results as their samples came from paternity test takers which may have skewed the results partly. Several other older studies have suggested that European ancestry is the main component in all Brazilian regions. Salzano (1997) reported 51% European, 36% African, and 13% Amerindian ancestry for the Northeastern population. Santos and Guerreiro (1995) found 47% European, 12% African, and 41% Amerindian ancestry in the north. In the southernmost state of Rio Grande do Sul, Dornelles et al. (1999) calculated 82% European, 7% African, and 11% Amerindian ancestries. Krieger et al. (1965) studied a Northeastern Brazilian population living in São Paulo and found that whites had 18% African and 12% Amerindian genetic contribution, while blacks had 28% European and 5% Amerindian genetic contribution. These Amerindian estimates, like others, have limitations. Compared to earlier studies, the 2002 study findings showed higher levels of bidirectional admixture between Africans and non-Africans.

In 2007 BBC Brasil launched the project Raízes Afro-Brasileiras (Afro-Brazilian Roots), in which they analyzed the genetic ancestry of nine famous Brazilian blacks and "pardos". Three tests were based on analysis of different parts of their DNA: an examination of paternal ancestry, maternal ancestry and the genomic ancestry, allowing to estimate the percentage of African, European and Amerindian genes in the composition of an individual. Of the nine people analyzed, three had more European ancestry than African, while the other six people had more African ancestry, with varying degrees of European and Amerindian admixture. The African admixture varied from 19.5% in actress Ildi Silva to 99.3% in singer Milton Nascimento. The European admixture varied from 0.4% in Nascimento to 70% in Silva. The Amerindian admixture ranges from 0.3% in Nascimento to 25.4% in football player Obina.

== Media ==
Afro-Brazilians, along with other non-European groups, are significantly underrepresented in Brazilian media. They have a low presence in telenovelas, which are the most-watched programs on Brazilian television. The Brazilian soap operas, as well as throughout Latin America, are accused of under-representing the Black, Mixed and Amerindian population and over-representing whites.

Brazil has produced telenovelas since the 1960s. Black actors in Brazil are usually required to follow stereotypes and are usually in subordinate and submissive roles, as maids, drivers, servants, bodyguards, and poor favelados. Joel Zito Araújo wrote the book A Negação do Brasil (The Denial of Brazil) which talks about how Brazilian TV hides the Black population. Araújo analyzed Brazilian telenovelas from 1964 to 1997 and only 4 black families were represented as being of middle-class. Black women usually appear under strong sexual connotation and sensuality. Black men usually appear as rascals or criminals.

Another common stereotype is of the "old mammies". In 1970, in the telenovela A Cabana do Pai Tomás (based on American novel Uncle Tom's Cabin), a white actor, Sérgio Cardoso, played Thomas, who was a black man in the book. The actor had to paint his body black to look black. The choice of a White actor to play a black character caused major protests in Brazil. In 1975 the telenovela Gabriela was produced, based on a book by Jorge Amado, who described Gabriela, the main character, as a mulata. But to play Gabriela on television Rede Globo chose Sônia Braga, who is an olive-skinned woman. The producer claimed he "did not find any talented Black actress" for the role of Gabriela. In 2001, Rede Globo produced Porto dos Milagres, also based on a book by Jorge Amado. In the book, Amado described a Bahia full of blacks. In Rede Globo's soap opera, on the other hand, almost all the cast was white. The same situation has been seen in the 2018 telenovela Segundo Sol, leading to new protests, mainly on social media. But once again TV Globo denied racism, saying "We base our cast selection by talent, not by race". In 2018, a survey conducted by UOL reported that Black actors represented approximately 7.98% of those employed in the drama departments of Brazil's three major television networks. The data considered the soap operas that were either airing or in production at Globo, Record, and SBT.

In the fashion world, Afro-Brazilians are also poorly represented. In Brazil, there is a clear predominance of models from the South of Brazil, mostly of European descent. Many black models complained of the difficulty of finding work in the fashion world in Brazil. This reflects a Caucasian standard of beauty demanded by the media. To change this trend, the Black Movement of Brazil entered in court against the fashion show, where almost all the models were whites. In a fashion show during São Paulo Fashion Week in January 2008, of the 344 models only eight (2.3% of total) were blacks. A public attorney required the fashion show to contract Black models and demanded that during São Paulo Fashion Week 2009, at least 10% of the models should be "Blacks, Afro-descendants or Indians", under penalty of fine of 250,000 reais.

== Culture ==
Carnival in Brazil is the traditional combination of a Roman Catholic festival with the lively celebrations of people of African ancestry. It evolved principally in urban coastal areas, notably in the former plantation zones along the coast between Recife and Rio de Janeiro. Salvador's Carnival is less highly commercialized and has a stronger African component.

=== Religion ===
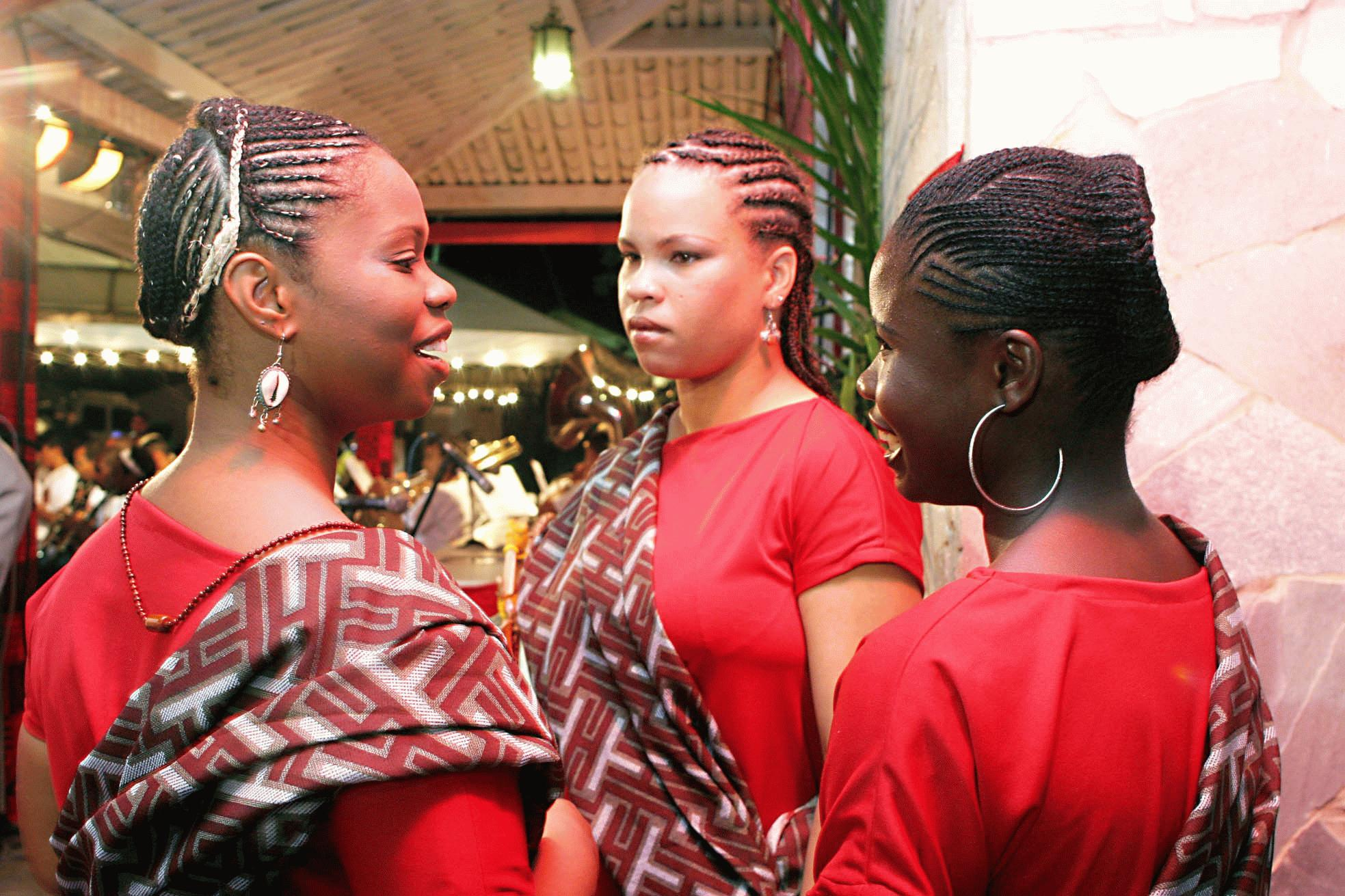
Black girls during a Candomblé ceremony.

Most Black Brazilian people are Christians, mainly Catholics. Afro-Brazilian religions such as Candomblé and Umbanda have many followers. Although these religions have a higher proportion of Black practitioners, Whites also make up a significant portion, particularly in Umbanda. These religions are mainly practiced in large urban centers such as Salvador, Recife, Rio de Janeiro, Porto Alegre, Brasília, São Luís. Candomblé is closer to the original West African religions, and Umbanda blends Catholic and Kardecist Spiritism beliefs with African beliefs. Candomblé, Batuque, Xango and Tambor de Mina were introduced to Brazil by enslaved Africans.

These enslaved Africans would summon their gods, called Orixas, Voduns or Inkices with chants and dances they had brought from Africa. These religions have been persecuted in the past, mainly due to Catholic influence. However, the Brazilian government has legalized them. In current practice, Umbanda followers leave offerings of food, candles and flowers in public places for the spirits. The Candomblé terreiros are more hidden from general view, except in famous festivals such as Iemanjá Festival and the Waters of Oxalá in the Northeast. From Bahia northwards there is also different practices such as Catimbo, Jurema with heavy, though not necessarily authentic, indigenous elements. Some Afro Brazilians can be considered Yoruba Brazilians.

Since the late 20th century, a large number of Afro-Brazilians became followers of Protestant denominations, mainly Neopentecostal churches. Among Brazil's predominant ethnicities, Blacks make up the largest proportion of Pentecostal Protestants, while Whites make up the largest group of non-Pentecostal Protestants. As mentioned, some black Brazilians are Muslims of Sunni sect whose ancestors were called Malê.

According to the 2022 demographic census, the Black population in Brazil is predominantly Christian, with 49.0% identifying as Catholics and 30.0% as Evangelicals. Only 2.3% of Black Brazilians follow Afro-Brazilian religions such as Candomblé and Umbanda, 1.5% profess Spiritism, 12.3% declare no religion, and 4.7% adhere to other faiths. Although African-derived religions are historically associated with Black populations and have a higher proportion of Black practitioners compared to other religious traditions, 42.9% of their adherents are white, while the remainder are brown (33.2%) and Black (23.2%).

=== Cuisine ===
The influence of African cuisine in Brazil is expressed in a wide variety of dishes. In the northeastern state of Bahia, an exquisite cuisine evolved when cooks improvised on African and traditional Portuguese dishes using locally available ingredients. Typical dishes include Vatapá and Moqueca, both with seafood and dendê palm oil (Portuguese: Azeite de Dendê). This heavy oil extracted from the fruits of an African palm tree is one of the basic ingredients in Bahian or Afro-Brazilian cuisine, adding flavor and bright orange color to foods. There is no equivalent substitute, but it is available in markets specializing in Brazilian or African imports.

Acarajé is a dish made from peeled black-eyed peas formed into a ball and then deep-fried in dendê (palm oil). It is found in Nigerian and Brazilian cuisine. The dish is traditionally encountered in Bahia, especially in the city of Salvador, often as street food, and is also found in most parts of Nigeria, Ghana and Benin.

=== Sports and dances ===
Similar to other countries with large populations of African descent, there are many Black Brazilian footballers.

Capoeira is a martial art developed initially by enslaved Africans who came predominantly from Angola or Mozambique to Brazil, starting in the colonial period. Appeared in Quilombo dos Palmares, located in the Captaincy of Pernambuco. Documents, legends and literature of Brazil record this practice, especially in the port of Salvador. Despite being reprimanded, Africans continued to practice this martial art on the pretext that it was just a dance. Until the present, capoeira confuses dance and fight, and is an important part of the culture of Brazil. It is marked by deft, tricky movements often played on the ground or completely inverted. It also has a strong acrobatic component in some versions and is always played with music. Recently, the sport has been popularized by capoeira performed in various computer games and movies, and capoeira music has been featured in modern pop music.

=== Music ===
The music of Brazil is a mixture of Portuguese, Amerindian, and African music, making a wide variety of styles. Brazil is well known for the rhythmic liveliness of its music as in its samba dance music.

== Notable people ==
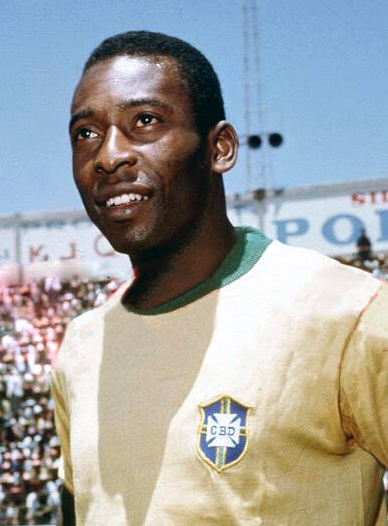
Pelé, often regarded as the greatest football player of all time

Many Afro-Brazilians have been prominent in Brazilian society, especially in the arts, music and sports. Many important figures in Brazilian literature have been of African descent, such as Machado de Assis, widely regarded as the greatest writer of Brazilian literature. Some of these individuals include Cruz e Sousa, symbolist poet, João do Rio, chronicler, Maria Firmina dos Reis, abolitionist and author, José do Patrocínio, journalist, among others.

In popular music, the talents of Afro-Brazilians have found fertile ground for their development. Masters of samba, Pixinguinha, Cartola, Lupicínio Rodrigues, Geraldo Pereira, Wilson Moreira, and of MPB, Milton Nascimento, Jorge Ben Jor, Gilberto Gil, have built the Brazilian musical identity.

Another field where Afro-Brazilians have excelled is football: Pelé, right-forward Leônidas da Silva, nicknamed "Black Diamond", are well known historic names of Brazilian football; Vinícius Júnior and many others continue this tradition.

Important athletes in other sports include NBA players, Nenê and Leandro Barbosa, nicknamed "The Brazilian Blur", referring to his speed. João Carlos de Oliveira Jadel Gregório, Nelson Prudêncio, Adhemar da Silva.

Particularly important among sports is capoeira, itself a creation of Black Brazilians; important "Mestres" (masters) include Mestre Amen Santo, Mestre Bimba, Mestre Cobra Mansa, Mestre João Grande, Mestre João Pequeno, Mestre Moraes, Mestre Pastinha, Mestre Pé de Chumbo.

Since the end of the 1980s, the political participation of Afro-Brazilians has increased. Some important politicians include former mayor of São Paulo Celso Pitta, former governor of Rio Grande do Sul, Alceu Collares, former governor of Espírito Santo, Albuíno Azeredo. Of the 170 justices who have served on the Supreme Federal Court since its inception during the imperial period, only three have been Black, with Joaquim Barbosa being the most recent, serving from 2003 to 2014.

Afro-Brazilians have also excelled as actors, such as Lázaro Ramos, Ruth de Souza, Lourdes de Oliveira, Zózimo Bulbul, Milton Gonçalves, Mussum, Zezé Motta, and as dancers, like Isa Soares.

== See also ==
- Haitian Brazilians
- Nigerian Brazilians
- Angolans in Brazil
- Batuque
- Kalunga
- Saro people
- Macumba
- Quimbanda
- Racial democracy
- Racism in Brazil
- Tambor de Mina
