= Botánica =

Religious goods store

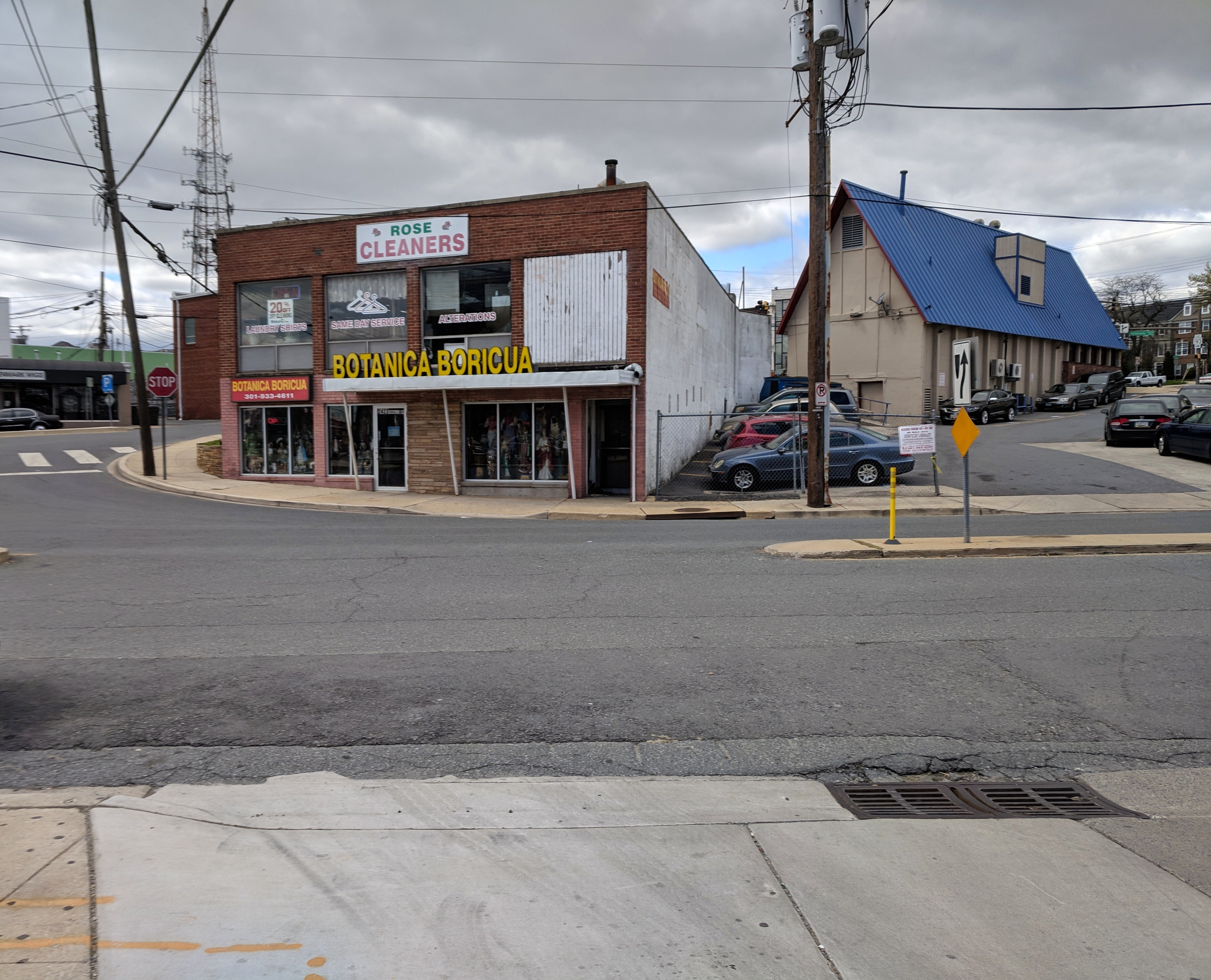
Botánicas such as this one in Wheaton, Maryland, cater to the Latino community and sell goods and services to address spiritual or physical needs.

A botánica (often written botanica and less commonly known as a hierbería or botica) is a religious goods store. The name botánica is Spanish and translates as "botany" or "plant store," referring to these establishments' function as dispensaries of medicinal herbs. Botánicas are common in many Hispanic American countries and Latino communities around the world. Such establishments sell folk medicine, herbs, candles, and statues of Saints. They also carry incense, perfumes, and books. Such stores have become increasingly popular in the United States as the Latino communities they serve have grown in that country. A botánica is often a site of spiritual healing and support, such that one owner says they are a "place of mysteries".

Botánicas sell products and services associated with spiritual practices such as Candomblé, Curanderismo, Espiritismo, Macumba, Palo Monte, Santa Muerte, María Lionza and Santería. Whether these items are viewed as cultural imports or adaptive responses on the part of immigrants to a new social environment, the majority of these products and services are used by those who seek guidance in their spiritual and social lives. According to ethnographic research, customers consult botánicas for guidance on health, relationships, finances, and personal struggles, drawing on practices that combine herbal remedies with religious or spiritual elements. People come to the botánica with a host of struggles and problems, and the customers seek assistance with these issues at botánicas.

There is extensive research and literature on botánicas as dispensers of healthcare in the Latino communities of the United States. Without access to professional health services, many Latinos have found effective care in the herbal treatments and psychological support that botánicas offer.

== History ==
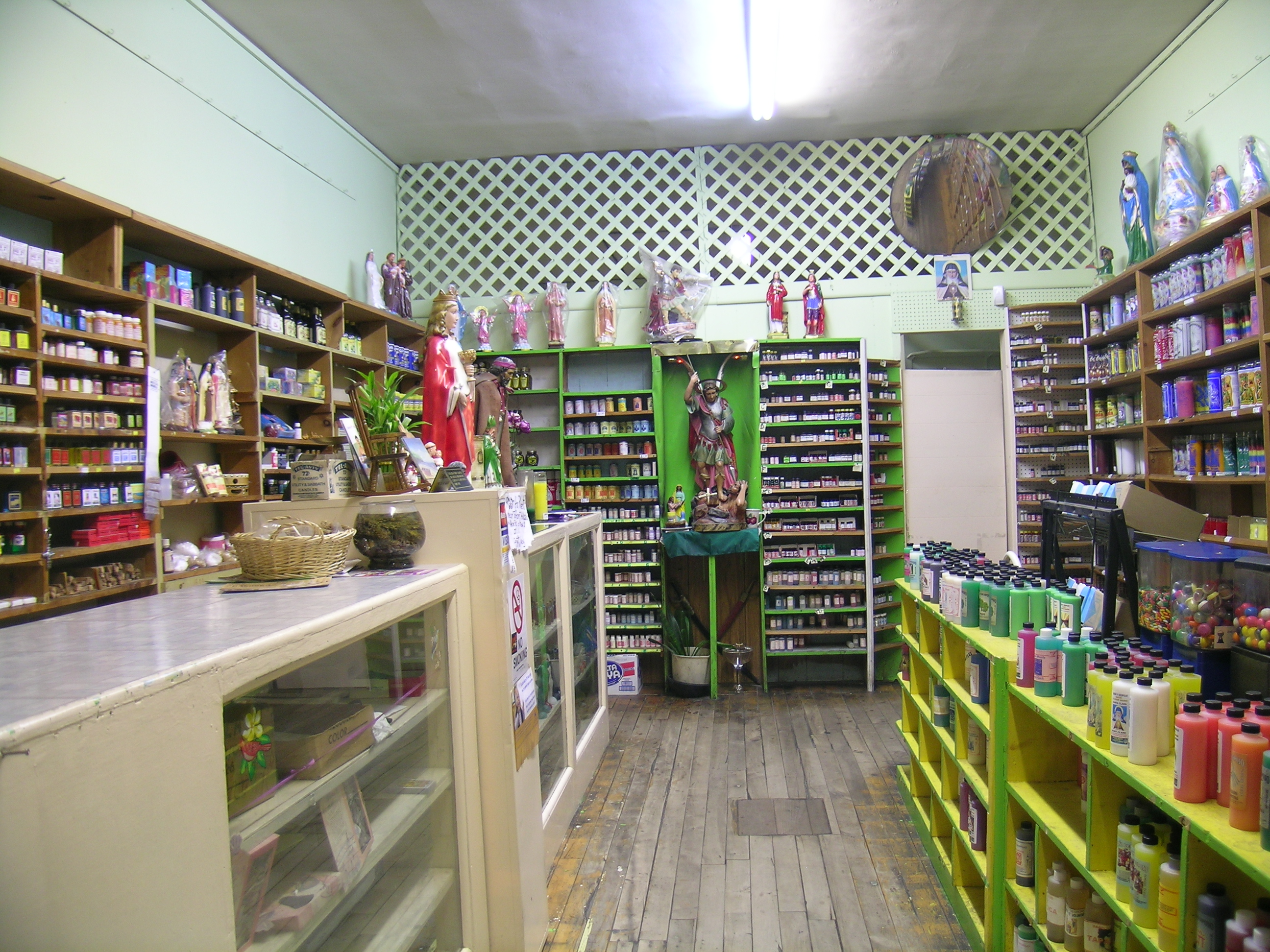
Botánicas, such as this one in Jamaica Plain, Massachusetts, cater to the Latino community and sell folk medicine alongside statues of Catholic saints, candles decorated with prayers, lucky bamboo, and other items.

Botánicas extend centuries-old practices of using plants and herbs to treat and heal illnesses. According to scholar Jules Janick, botánicas have their roots in the relationship of the Aztecs of Mexico and the Spaniards. The Aztecs showed the Spaniards their methods to healing, such as which plants had curative properties and how to use them. Soon after, the Spaniards began to keep records of the names of the plants and their uses. These practices continued and evolved as household remedies during and after the Spanish conquest. Generally a person who practiced the art of folk healing became known as a curandero, with the practice known as Curanderismo.

The blending of cultures through Spanish colonialism introduced other influences on the religious and healing practices that later became crystallized in botánicas. During the trans-Atlantic slave trade, the Spanish brought large numbers of Africans to their colonies in North America, South America, and the Caribbean. Many of them brought along their African religious beliefs. Much as Vodou developed under French colonialism in Haiti as a blend of Roman Catholicism and African religions, Santería ("Way of the Saints") developed along similar lines in Cuba. Santería absorbed a strong influence from Spanish Catholicism. Its rituals include dancing, drumming and speaking with spirits. As practitioners of these religions have immigrated to the U.S. and other countries, botánicas allows customers to have access to materials used in their religious rituals.

Evidence suggests that the first botánicas were opened in Cuba and Puerto Rico in the late 1950s and early 1960s. These shops were initially “green pharmacies” operated by herbalists. The earliest Mexican and Mexican American botanicas seem to date to the late 1960s and early 1970s. Others argue that the botánica first emerged in the United States, citing New York's Spanish Harlem as the birthplace. According to this theory, similar shops spread out first across the U.S. and only later back to the Caribbean and Latin American countries from which these practices originated. Over the following decades, people from a wide variety of cultural and ethnic backgrounds have founded and used botánicas for economic and cultural benefit.

=== Spirits ===
Botánicas are religious shops, a place to buy the material objects that enable people to interact with spirits. The majority of the products offered for sale and the services provided at botánicas are most closely associated with Afro-Cuban religions (Santería and Palo Mayombe); Latin American Spiritist doctrine (Espiritismo); localized, vernacular expressions of Catholic piety (folk Catholicism); and Latin American folk healing or traditional medicine (Curanderismo). In many of these practices, African divinities and spirits are syncretized with Catholic saints. Religious rituals often aim to induce possession trance to enable spirits to interact with mortals through a medium. Reglas de Kongo or Palo also originated in Cuba; this religion solicits African spirits and spirits of the dead to aid the living. Botánicas are commonly also embedded in Espiritismo. A tradition established by Frenchman Allan Kardec, popular in Puerto Rico, Cuba, the Dominican Republic, and elsewhere, it focuses on communicating with spirits of dead through séance, writing, and possession. Finally, another popular aspect found in botanicas include Latin American manifestations with shrines and altars to saints rooted in folk Catholicism.

== Goods and services ==
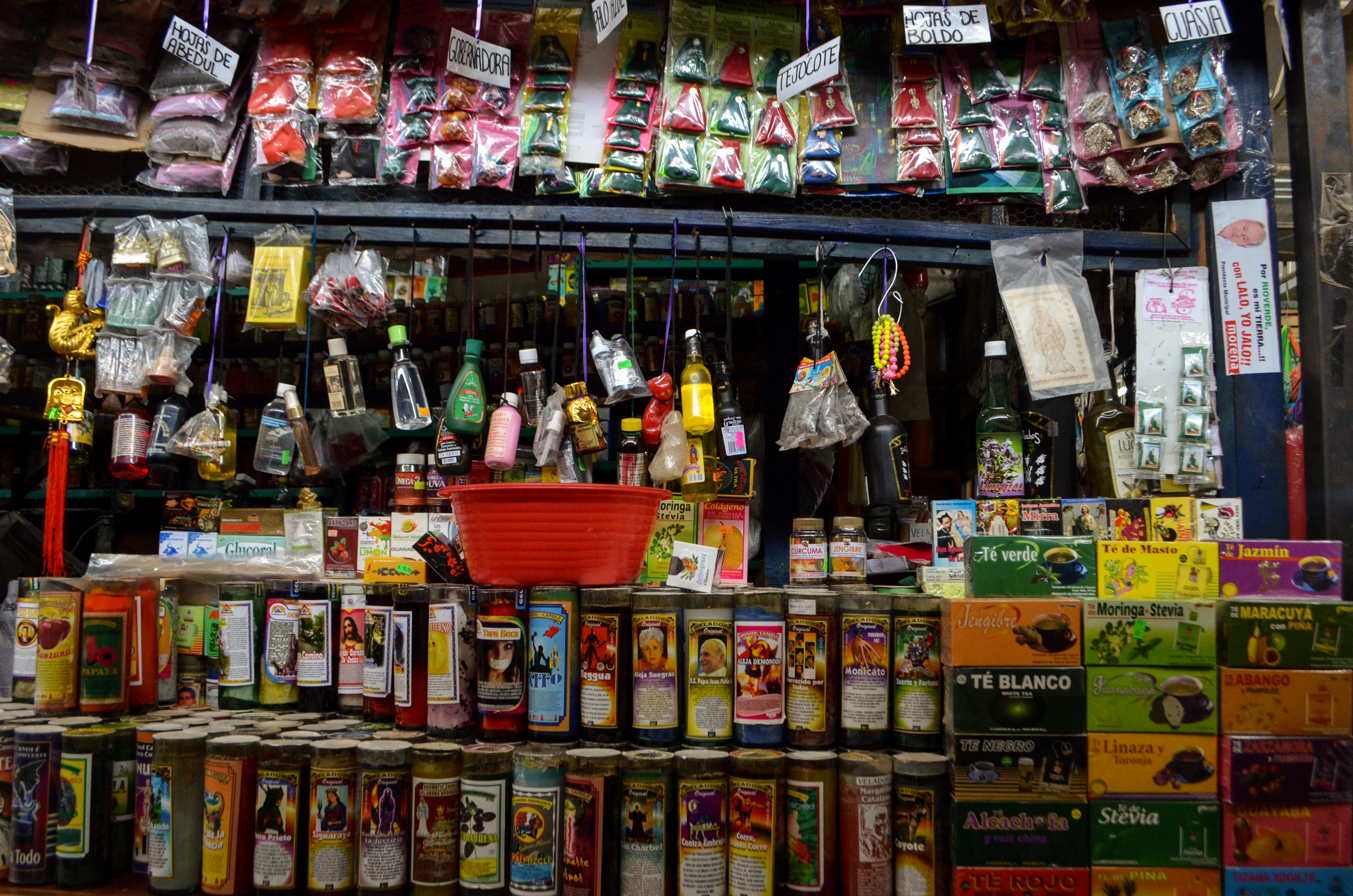
Colors and smells of Santeria: colorful assortment of items sold in a botánica.

Botánicas offer a variety of spiritual and religious merchandise and services, including candles, incense, potions, powders, icons, statues and consultations. Other items found in the shops include novena candles, oils, incense, books and statues of saints. One popular item is a type of glass candle called a veladora or vela; each color typically symbolizes a different meaning. For instance, red stands for love, green symbolizes prosperity, white guards children, yellow protects adults, and orange resolves family conflicts. Scholar Michael Owen Jones found that in Los Angeles botánicas, shopkeepers reported that most patrons were interested in love-related items first (attracting and maintaining relationships), then luck, and then protection from enemies and seeking justice.

The term botánica refers to botanicals or herbs. This name acknowledges the fact that many of the goods sold in such stores are intended for use in rituals that involve special herbs, which are sometimes used as medicines. Besides being a place to merely obtain goods, botánicas serve as unique sites for the performance of religious culture. Alternative medical treatments found in botánicas are used to treat such varied conditions as arthritis, asthma, hair loss, menstrual pain, and diabetes. There are also products that are designed to attract love, bring good luck and financial prosperity, deflect jealousy and so on.

=== Services ===
In addition to selling goods, botánicas often offer religious and medical services. Services include divination, individual and family counseling, wellness recommendations, spiritual cleansing (Spanish: limpias), and more. In 2005, such services usually cost between $15 and $25, with a typical session lasting about 20 minutes. Before a service is determined and performed, the healer holds a consultation. This service helps identify the root of the client's problem, whether it is due to supernatural, physical, or emotional causes, and thereby helps identify the best treatment.

Spiritual cleansing may be as simple as rubbing flowers on the person's body, or as elaborate as using candles, incense, and animal sacrifice along with prayer. In addition to treating clients with rituals of transference, practitioners often assist them with limpias aimed at getting rid of negative energy. The type of cleansing performed depends on the healer's religious orientation as well as on the client's particular needs. Limpias is the Spanish word for clean, referring to the ritual cleansing aimed at getting rid of negative energy. More complex ones requiring the burning of copal incense, the use of perfumed water, oils, candles, and eggs, and extensive prayers. Simple limpias may be offered at no cost but also around 2005 and 2006, the cost for a limpia was around $40 to $50.

Botánicas also provide services to help with more specific interpersonal, legal, financial, and metaphysical matters that include achieving domestic tranquility, solving immigration problems, avoiding or resolving legal issues, attracting or repelling a suitor, obtaining or keeping a job, securing good luck, attaining protection from envy and evil spirits, and removing or reversing spells.

Botánicas are often a first line of healthcare for many Latino families, with hospitals being a last resort. That is, researchers have found that Latin American immigrants in the United States often distrust the hospital medical system. Thus, in opposition to it, they continue to use their own culturally appropriate healthcare practices. In Curanderismo, Santería, and Espiritismo, the practitioners assess the patient and, depending on diagnosis, prepares a healing remedy or a variety of healing remedies. This may contain any combination of medicinal herbs, religious amulets, and/or other products used for the prevention, treatment, or palliation of folk and somatic illnesses. Ultimately, botánicas serve as a bridge in efforts to develop community healthcare programs that link families with conventional medical practitioners who lack their native familiarity.

== Community role ==
Botánicas are crucial to the communities they serve because they provide healing, hope, meaning, and support. The support they provide is a continuation of many homeland traditions for people living in conditions of diaspora, immigration, and exile. Botánicas provide a place for people to congregate, socialize, and discuss political and other issues that affect immigrant communities without fear of censure or reprisal. Some botánicas sponsor festivals, parties, or religious ceremonies attended by families from the immediate communities but also from other cities. As sites of healing and communal support, botanicas operate not only as settings for spiritual contemplation but also as information bases. These spots are commonly meeting place for immigrants from Central America, South America and the Caribbean. Botánicas are popular in heavily populated urban and Latino communities like Miami, New York, Los Angeles, the Greater Boston Area, and the Texas Triangle. Botánicas bring Africa, Latin America, and the U.S. together through their services and goods. At the botánica, people can find strength in this affirmation of identity, both in the preservation of creative, sustaining traditions from home countries as well as in building a new space in a new world.

== Bibliography ==
- Jones. (2020). Herbs and Saints in the City of Angels: Researching Botánicas, Healing, and Power in Southern California. The Journal of American Folklore, 133(527), 53. doi: doi:10.5406/jamerfolk.133.527.0053
- Murphy, J. M. (2015). Botánicas: sacred spaces of healing and devotion in urban America. Jackson: University Press of Mississippi.
- Polk, P. A., ed. (2005). Botánica Los Angeles: Latino popular religious art in the city of angels. Seattle, WA: University of Washington Press.
- Robert T. Trotter II/Trotter II, Robert T., Juan Antonio Chavira/Chavira, Juan Antonio. Curanderismo: Mexican American Folk Healing. University of Georgia Press, Second Edition, October 1997.
- Rose-Rodriguez, L., (2007) Botanicas in Connecticut: Implications for Allopathic Practitioners. Unpublished master's thesis. University of Connecticut.
