= Isa Soares =

Brazilian-born Argentine dancer

- Born: 1953 (age 72–73); Maragogipe, Bahia, Brazil
- Occupations: dancer, activist
- Years active: 1985-present
- Known for: reintroducing African culture through dance to Argentina

Isa Soares (born 1953) is a Brazilian-born Argentine dancer and activist involved in creating awareness of the African traditions of Argentina and fighting racism against Afro-Argentine peoples. She was one of the pioneers in developing African dance interpretation and instruction in Argentina.

== Early life ==
María Isabel Soares Sousa was born in 1953 in Maragogipe, of the Brazilian state of Bahia to Afro-Brazilian parents Iraildes Sousa Gomes and Fernando Bispo Soares. Her father had degrees in both biochemistry and music, and her mother was a dressmaker and tobacconist. After completing her primary and secondary education, Soares attended the Federal Institute of Bahia in Salvador, earning her teaching credentials in 1972. She moved to São Paulo and had a son, while continuing her education at the University of São Paulo. The focus of her studies was on the socio-cultural and historic development of dance and the impact of the slave trade upon cultural practices.

== Career ==
While continuing her studies, Soares worked as a primary school teacher. She took dance lessons with Wilson Silva, who taught her the basic techniques of African dance and how those spread into the Americas through candombe in Uruguay, samba from Brazil and tap dancing in the United States. In 1982, she married and as was expected of women in her generation, followed her husband to Argentina, giving up her career in 1983. The couple settled in Bahía Blanca and Soares returned to her studies through the National Technical Education Council (Spanish: Consejo Nacional de Educación Técnica (CONET)), earning her technical instructor's certification. As there were few prospects for a black woman in the arts to earn a living in Bahía Blanca, she left the area in 1985 and moved to Buenos Aires. Between 1985 and 1987, Soares studied and worked as a dance instructor on a scholarship in the dance school of Aida Prestifilippo, the principal dancer of the Teatro Colón. In addition to providing the scholarship Prestifilippo helped introduce Soares to the dance circuit in Buenos Aires, allowing her to perform at various local venues.

The era was one of cultural expansion, following the suppression of individual expression throughout the period of National Reorganization Process from 1973-1983. From the end of the dictatorship, Soares gave lessons in African dance at a small salon on Corrientes Street in Buenos Aires and organized performances and events to expand the knowledge of black culture in Argentina. Beginning in 1987, she worked as a dance instructor of a course Dance of Orixás (Spanish: Danza de Orixás for the Centro Cultural Ricardo Rojas, an organization affiliated with the University of Buenos Aires. Between 1990 and 2006, Soares was the coordinator for African dance at the Centro and began traveling to places like Rosario, Santa Fe in the Santa Fe Province to teach and back to Brazil for students to train in Bahia. She also hosted annual summer courses on dances with African roots through the Municipal Institute of Education for Art in the Municipality of Avellaneda. Forming an association with activists, artists and intellectuals, Soares actively worked to fight racial discrimination and bring back an awareness of the roots of black culture in Argentina.

At the end of 2006, Soares left the Center, though she continued with private dance instruction and taught a seminar which consolidated Afro-Brazilian and Afro-Cuban dance styles. In 2007, she began teaching courses at the Instituto Universitario Nacional del Arte as well as directing an independent project, known as the Alábase Project, which focuses on the study and performance of the methodology of the Yoruban dance based upon the tradition of xiré. She is considered one of the pioneering dancers who brought African cultural expression back to Argentina after the close of the dictatorship.
