= Matos Soares =

Portuguese Catholic priest and professor

Manuel de Matos e Silva Soares de Almeida
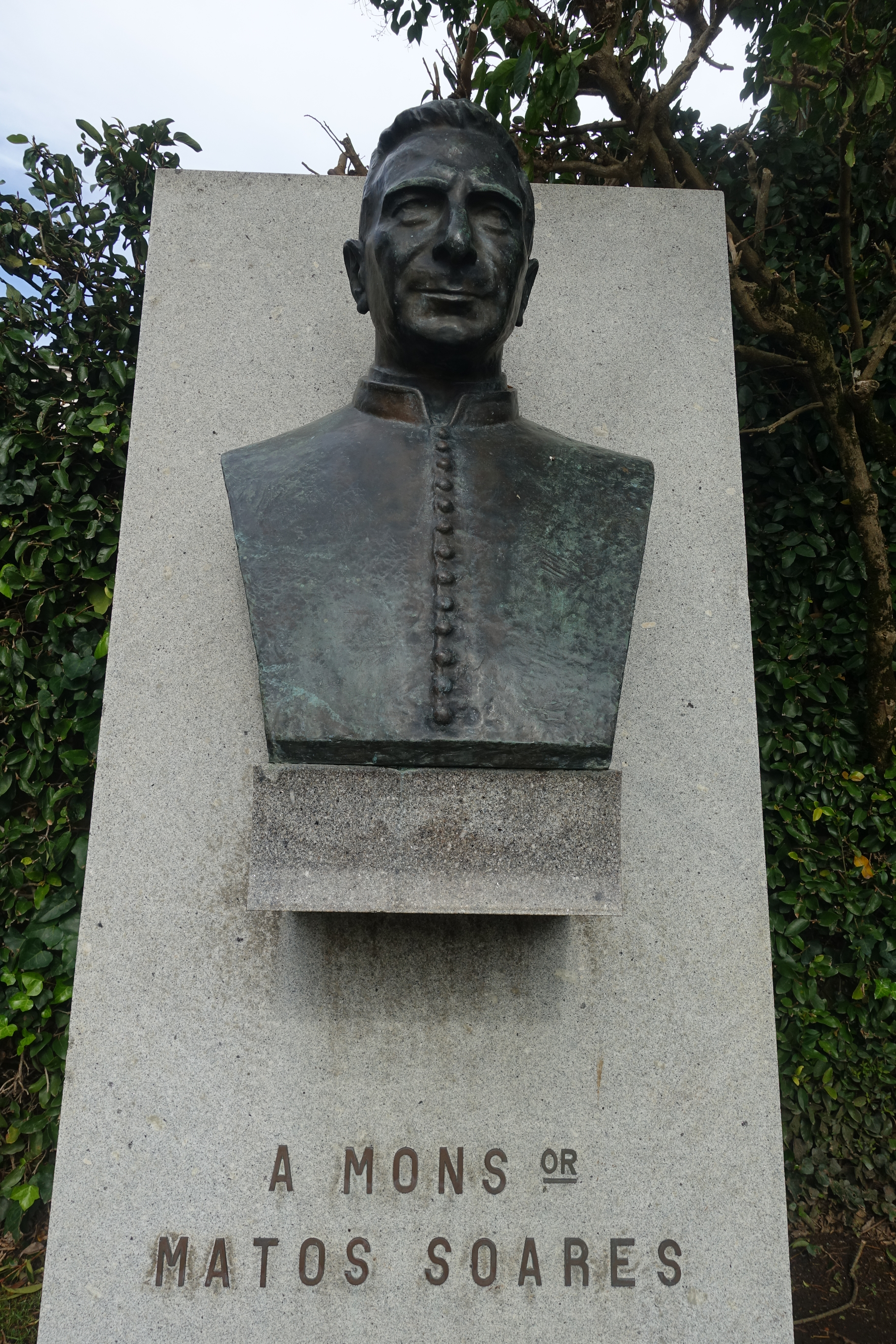
- Died: 1957
- Other name: Matos Soares
- Occupations: Priest, Translator
- Notable work: Translation of the Holy Bible from the Vulgate into Portuguese

Manuel de Matos e Silva Soares de Almeida, better known as Father Matos Soares (?–1957), was a Portuguese Catholic priest, prefect and professor of the Seminary of Nossa Senhora da Conceição (Seminário Maior or da Sé), Rector of the Chapel of Fradelos and parish priest of the Paróquia Nossa Senhora da Conceição in the city and Diocese of Porto, having been the promoter of the new construction of the Church. He was responsible for translating several works, notably the Holy Bible into Portuguese.

== Bible translation ==
The main work of Fr. Matos Soares was the commented translation of the Holy Bible from the Vulgate into Portuguese, whose first edition was published in 1932, with the help of Fr. Luiz Gonzaga da Fonseca, Professor at the Biblical Institute of Rome, with the other editions having been published in the years 1934, 1940, 1946 and 1952. The 1956 edition was the first edition in which the author translated directly from the biblical manuscripts in Greek and Hebrew available in his day, resorting to the Vulgate when direct translation from manuscripts rendered the text obscure.

Editions of the Bible by Father Matos Soares received Imprimatur from Dom António Barbosa Leão, Bishop of Porto, and great appreciation from the Holy See, on the part of Pope Pius XI, whose message of esteem from Cardinal Pacelli, future Pope Pius XII, can be found soon at the beginning of the translator's editions.

== Modern reissues in Brazil ==
In 2019, Editora Ecclesiae published the re-edition of the New Testament by Father Matos Soares, adapting the author's translation from the Latin Vulgate to the New Vulgate. In 2022, Editora Ecclesiae published the re-edition of the complete Bible of Father Matos Soares according to the original languages (1956 edition). Also in the same year, Editora Realeza, together with Associação Obras Católicas, published the re-edition of the complete Bible of Padre Matos Soares from the Latin Vulgate (first edition of 1932), adding the illustrations made by Gustave Doré for La Grande Bible de Tours.

== Other works ==
Among the works of Fr. Manuel de Matos Soares, the following can be highlighted:

• O meu Evangelho – Devocionário, Evangelho e Actos dos Apóstolos; 1933.

• Biografia da serva de Deus Gema Galgani (Virgem de Luca: 1878–1903), traduzido pelo Pe. Matos Soares, 1923.

• Ano Cristão (Pe. Croiset, S. J.) Devocionário para todos os domingos, dias de Quaresma e festas móveis, obra revista pelo Pe. Matos.

• Obras de Virgílio anotadas por Ferreira da Silva e Matos Soares, 1918.

• Manual de Eloquência Sagrada, 1925.
