= Teresinha Soares =

Brazilian pop art artist (1927–2026)

Teresinha Soares (1927 – 31 March 2026) was a Brazilian pop art artist who lived and worked in Belo Horizonte, Brazil. She produced art during the 1960s and 1970s and was best known for her erotic artwork that explored femininity and pushed back against Brazil's oppressive government.

== Background ==
Teresinha Soares was born in 1927 in Araxá, in the state of Minas Gerais. Soares lived and worked in Belo Horizonte. She first began writing and acting before she pursued art as a full-time career, but she still continued to enjoy these activities.

Soares was producing art while Brazil was under military rule. She fought back against Brazil's dictatorship by making art that was more political and challenged the government's conservatism and strict censorship rules. Her artwork was considered pop art, which depicts popular and mass culture, and Brazilian new figuration, a type of art that Soares was introduced to in either Rio de Janeiro or São Paulo. Cecelia Fajardo-Hill and Andrea Giunta have stated that this is because her pieces, which were usually two-dimensional and three-dimensional, were vibrantly colored and contained bold shapes.

According to Fajardo-Hill and Giunta, her artwork was also considered erotic. Traditionally, the erotic was defined as men having sexual thoughts about women. Women were always the object of men's sexual feelings and desires. The two have further stated that many artists like Teresinha Soares created erotic art that fought back against this sexist view of females.

Unfortunately, Soares did receive criticism for her art throughout her career. Her artwork was controversial because it was erotic and dealt with topics like sexual orientation and liberation, women's rights, and Brazil's dictatorship. Her art greatly upset conservative Brazilian people.

Soares died in Belo Horizonte on 31 March 2026, at the age of 99. Her daughter Valeska Soares is a sculptor, multi-media and installation artist.

== Education ==
Soares was educated and trained in art, as she had studied at multiple universities and enrolled in several classes to better her art skills. She began her art training in 1965 at an art university in Belo Horizonte, Brazil. One year later in 1966, Soares continued her education by taking composition classes with Fayga Ostrower, who was a well-known painter. While taking composition classes, she also enrolled in metal engraving classes at a university in Belo Horizonte. In the same year, Soares moved to Rio de Janeiro, Brazil to continue to take art classes. Some of the classes she was enrolled in were taught by the Brazilian artists Ivan Serpa, Rubens Gerchman, and Anna Maria Maiolino.

== Artworks ==
=== A Box to Make Love In (1967) ===
One of Soares's popular pieces of artwork is titled A Box to Make Love In. It was one of Soares's earliest sculptures and was displayed in an exhibit titled Box Form at the Petite Galerie in Rio de Janeiro, Brazil. A Box to Make Love In is a wooden box painted with bright greens, reds, and yellows. It has random objects attached to it like rubber tubes, a meat mincer, and a small bottle of dragon Vaseline. On the top of the box, there are two faces that make the shape of a heart. It also has a red fabric heart coming out of the box. A Box to Make Love In is a type of art called Brazilian new objectivity. Brazilian new objectivity is the creation of new forms of art that are slightly avant-garde.

=== She Hit on Me (BEDS) (1970) ===
One of Soares's well-known artworks is titled She Hit on Me (BEDS), which was installed at Municipal Park in Belo Horizonte, Brazil in 1970. She Hit on Me (BEDS) is three wooden beds that are the colors of a Brazilian football team and have shutters shaped as the bodies of naked females on it. On the other side of the shutters, there are brightly painted pictures of three football players named Pelé, Yustrich, and Tostão. This particular piece was participatory artwork since visitors could interact with the piece by sitting on the beds. According to Sofia Gotti, She Hit on Me (BEDS) represented masculinity and femininity, but was also political because it allowed for the coming together of Brazil's national identity with the intimate, perhaps sexual, aspect of the beds.

=== Corpo a corpo in cor-pus meus (1971) ===
Teresinha Soares's first big installation is titled Corpo a corpo in cor-pus meus, which translates to "body to body in colour-pus of mine." This installation was based on erotic drawings Soares made a year earlier titled Eurótica. Corpo a corpo in cor-pus meus consists of four blocks of white wood that are all different shapes. They are all different heights and take up twenty-four square meters of space. The piece is open to participation by the viewers. When Corpo a corpo in cor-pus meus was first revealed to the public, there was an opening day performance at the Grand Salon of the Museu de Arte da Pampulha in 1970. Teresinha Soares spoke while performers danced around and on the blocks of wood.

=== Xifópagas Uterinas ===
Another one of Teresinha Soares's artworks is titled Xifópagas Uterinas. It is a painting of what seems to be a female body. The colors Soares used are bright greens, blues, reds, and oranges. Xifópagas Uterinas can be considered pop art because of its vibrant colors.

== Exhibitions ==
=== Solo exhibitions ===
- 1967 – Teresinha Soares caixas e óleos, Galeria Guignard, Belo Horizonte, Brazil
- 1969 – Teresinha Soares, Museu Dona Beja, Araxá, Brazil
- 1971 – Teresinha Soares, Petite Galerie, Rio de Janeiro, Brazil
- 2010 – Teresinha Soares, Galeria Livroobjeto, Belo Horizonte, Brazil
- 2017 – Quem tem medo de Teresinha Soares?, Museu de Arte de São Paulo

=== Group exhibitions ===
- 1967 and 1971 - Bienal de São Paulo, São Paulo, Brazil
- 1970 – From Body to Earth
- 1968 – The Brazilian Artist and Mass Iconography, Faculdade de Desenho Industrial, Rio de Janeiro, Brazil
- 2007 – Neovanguardas, Museu de Arte da Pampulha, Belo Horizonte, Brazil
- 2015 – The World Goes Pop, Tate Modern, London, England
- 2017 – Radical Women: Latin American Art, 1960-1985, Hammer Museum, Los Angeles
- 2017 – Who’s Afraid of Teresinha Soares?, Museu de Arte de São Paulo, Brazil
- 2018 – Radical Women: Latin American Art, 1960-1985, Brooklyn Museum of Art, New York

=== Unknown date (group exhibition) ===
- Box Form-Petite Galerie, Rio de Janeiro, Brazil

== Honors and awards ==
- 1968 – Second grand prize at the Salão Municipal de Belas Artes in Belo Horizonte, Brazil
- 1971 – Acquisition prize at the 3rd Salão Nacional de Arte
- 1973 – Jury Exemption Award at the Salão Nacional de Arte Moderna in Rio de Janeiro, Brazil

== Publications ==
Soares created Eurótica, which was an artist's book consisting of line drawings. She also wrote a poem, which she read aloud at an exhibition in 1971 at the Galeria Petite in Rio de Janeiro, Brazil.

== Bibliography ==
- Gotti, Sofia. A Pantagruelian Pop: Teresinha Soares’s ‘Erotic Art of Contestation.’ Tate Modern. Retrieved 2026-04-03. ISSN 1753-9854.
- Moffitt, Evan; Soares, Valeska (2018-08-20). "My Influences: Valeska Soares." Frieze. Retrieved 2018-05-25.
- Morgan, Jessica; Frigeri, Flavia (2015). The World Goes Pop. North America: Yale University Press. ISBN 978-0-300-21699-8.
- Napolitano, Marcos (2018-04-26). "The Brazilian Military Regime, 1964–1985." Oxford Research Encyclopedia of Latin American History. doi:10.1093/acrefore/9780199366439.013.413
- Tate. Artist interview: Teresinha Soares Retrieved 2026-04-03.
