= Cássio Soares =

Brazilian politician (born 1981)

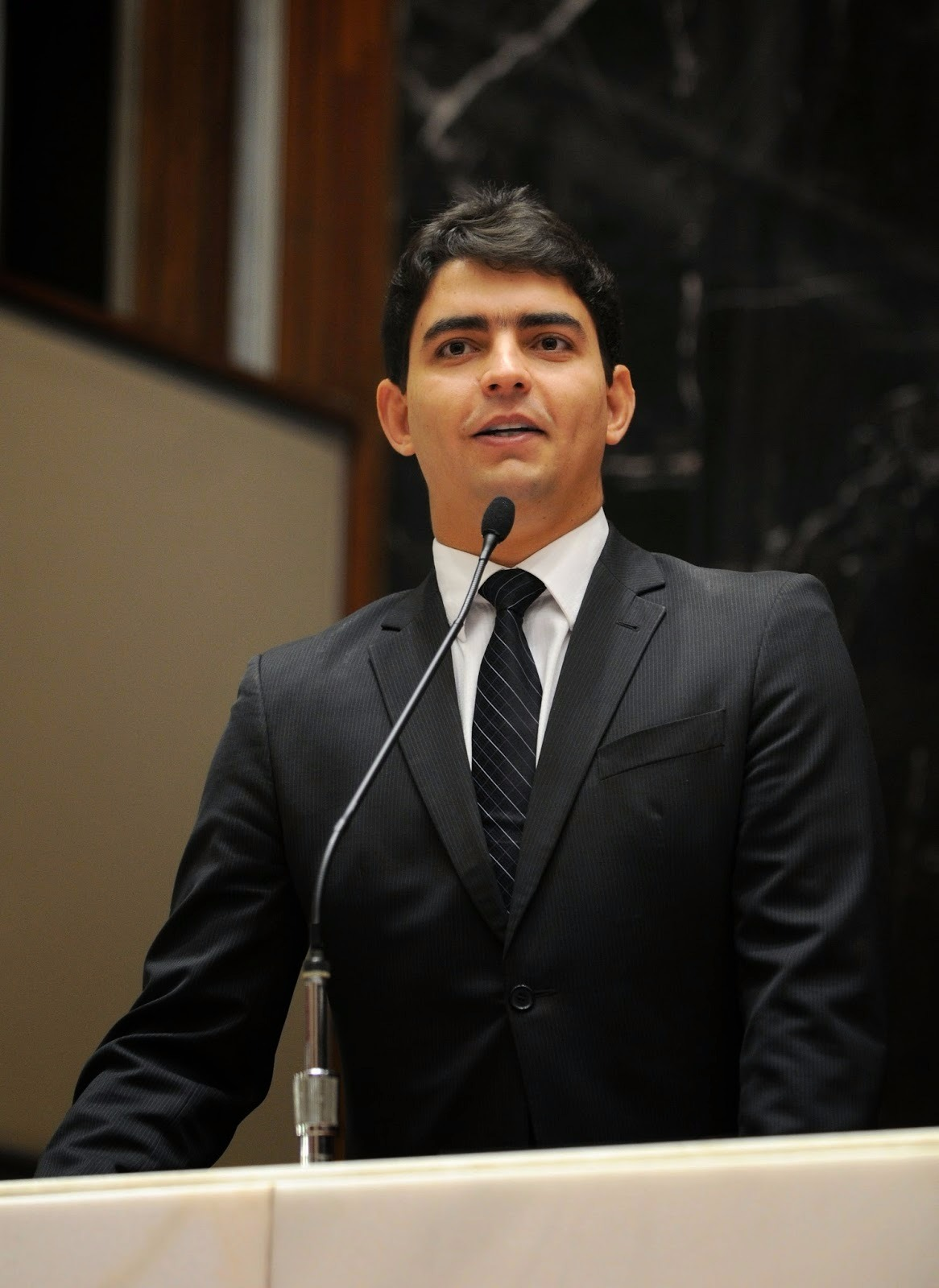
- Soares in 2017

Member of the Legislative Assembly of Minas Gerais
- Incumbent
- Assumed office 1 February 2011

Personal details
- Born: 7 June 1981 (age 45)
- Party: Social Democratic Party (since 2011)

Cássio Antônio Ferreira Soares (born 7 June 1981) is a Brazilian politician serving as a member of the Legislative Assembly of Minas Gerais since 2011. From 2012 to 2014, he served as secretary of social development of Minas Gerais.
