= Edward Telles =

American sociologist

- Born: Los Angeles, California
- Occupations: sociologist, demographer
- Known for: Race in Another America: The Significance of Skin Color in Brazil and Pigmentocracies: Ethnicity, Race and Skin Color in Latin America
- Website: https://www.edwardtelles.com

Edward E. Telles is an American sociologist and distinguished professor of sociology at the University of California, Irvine. His research focuses on race, ethnicity and immigration in the United States and Latin America.

== Education and career ==
After studying anthropology at Stanford University, Telles taught English as a second language to immigrants in Los Angeles and then worked in the city government's community development division, administering grants for housing and job training. While working for the city, he earned a master's degree in urban planning at the University of California, Los Angeles (UCLA). He later received a Ph.D. in sociology from the University of Texas at Austin.

== Career ==
Telles joined the UCLA sociology faculty as a professor in 1988 and remained there until 2008. From 1997 to 2000, while on leave from UCLA, he was the human rights program officer at the Ford Foundation's Rio de Janeiro office, where he awarded grants to advance human rights. He became a professor of sociology at Princeton University in 2008, and later held a faculty position at the University of California, Santa Barbara. He joined the University of California, Irvine in 2020, where he directs the university's program on international migration. He has also been a visiting scholar at the Russell Sage Foundation (2004 to 2005) and at Sciences Po in Paris (2019), and a visiting professor in Brazil at the State University of Campinas (1989 to 1990) and the Federal University of Bahia (1994, as a senior Fulbright fellow).

== Books ==
Telles's book Race in Another America: The Significance of Skin Color in Brazil (2004) examines how skin color and racial identity shape socioeconomic life, culture and racial policy in Brazil, using demography, ethnography, history and policy analysis. The American Sociological Association honored it as the best book published in sociology in 2004, and it was reviewed in academic journals including The Americas.
