= Valeska Soares =

Brazilian-American sculptor and installation artist

- Born: 1957 (age 68–69); Belo Horizonte, MG
- Education: Universidade Santa Úrsula (bachelor), Pratt Institute (masters), New York University (doctorate)
- Known for: sculpture, installation, video, photography, drawing
- Website: http://valeskasoares.net/

Valeska Soares (born in 1957 in Belo Horizonte, MG) is a Brooklyn-based Brazilian-American sculptor and installation artist.

Her sculptures and installations utilize a wide range of materials—including reflective mirrors, antique books and furniture, chiseled marble, bottles of perfume—and draw on both her training in architecture and the tools of minimalism and conceptualism.

Soares is the daughter of Teresinha Soares, a Brazilian painter and installation artist.

== Education and career ==
Valeska Soares received a Bachelor of Architecture from the Universidade Santa Úrsula, Rio de Janeiro, in 1987. In 1990, she completed a graduate certificate in the History of Art and Architecture from the Pontifícia Universidade Católica of Rio de Janeiro.

She presented her first solo exhibition in 1991 at Rio's Espaço Cultural Sérgio Porto. That same year she was awarded a fellowship from Coordenação de Aperfeiçoamento de Pessoal de Nível Superior (CAPES) to obtain an MFA from Pratt Institute, leading her to move to New York in 1992. In 1994, after completing her MFA, she became a Doctor of Arts Candidate at the New York University School of Education and had her first New York solo exhibition at the Information Gallery. In 1996, Soares received a Guggenheim Fellowship for Fine Arts.

In 2003 she had her first survey exhibition, Valeska Soares: Follies, which was presented by the Bronx Museum of the Arts and traveled to the Museo de Arte Contemporâneo in Monterrey in Mexico.

Soares’ work has been included in numerous international exhibitions, including the Venice Biennale of 2011 and 2005; the São Paulo Biennial of 2009, 1998, and 1994; the Sharjah Biennial in 2009; the Taipei Biennal in 2006; the Liverpool Biennial in 2004; and the Havana Biennial in 1991.

== Work ==
Soares' education in architecture solidified her interest in site specificity and artworks that consider their spatial context. According to the book Latin American Artists from 1785 to Now, her work displays elements of abstraction alongside Minimalism and Conceptual art. She is fascinated with objects, time, and memory, her work exploring the merging point of these that affects the transition from one physical or psychological state into another.

Soares's sculptures and installations repeatedly contrast slick, reflective materials such as stainless steel and mirrors, with more ephemeral ones, like roses and lilies, revealing her interest in matters of subjectivity, perception, reflection, and distortion. These mirrored surfaces are used as a way to engage the viewers, who transition from passive spectator to active participant. She also uses numerous other sensory techniques, like sound, and smell, to create new environments and experiences for viewers.

Recurring themes in Soares' work are interpersonal relationships, glossaries, labyrinths, and gardens, elements through which the artist alludes to mythology, literature, and to art history itself. These themes act as a similar result in personal experience, and that individual moment relating to what is a surrounding collective feeling:

For instance...each time I look at myself in the mirror, I can't recognize myself because what I see reflected is not exactly who I think I am. I thought perhaps there was a similar fluctuation of perception in the Tijuana/San Diego area. People who live very close to one another think of themselves and one another in particular ways, but in reality, distort and reflect one another simultaneously.

== Public collections ==
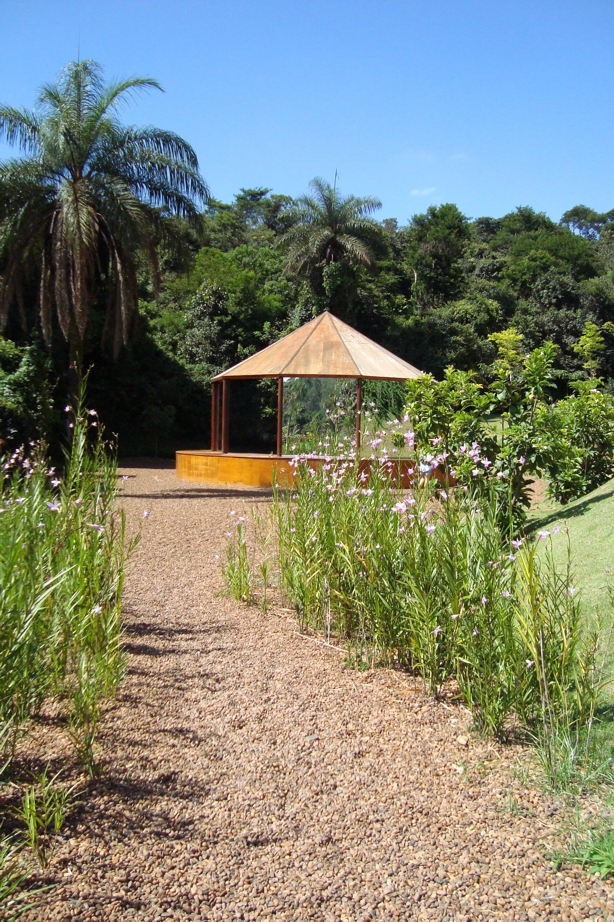
Valeska Soares pavilion in Inhotim, Brumadinho, MG, Brazil.

Soares work is included in the collections of museums and cultural institutions in Brazil, Spain, Switzerland, England, Mexico and USA:

- Albright-Knox Art Gallery, Buffalo, NY, USA
- Bronx Museum of the Arts, Bronx, NY, USA
- Burger Collection, Zürich, Switzerland
- Carnegie Museum of Art, Pittsburgh, PA, USA
- Centro Galego de Arte Contemporánea – CGAC, Santiago de Compostela, Spain
- Cisneros Fontanals Art Foundation, Miami, FL, USA
- Corcoran Gallery of Art, Washington, DC, USA
- Dallas Museum of Art, Dallas, TX, USA
- Daros Foundation, Zürich, Switzerland
- Fundação Cultural ITAU, São Paulo, SP, Brazil
- Fundación “la Caixa”, Barcelona, Spain
- Hirshhorn Museum and Sculpture Garden, Washington DC, USA
- Inhotim – Centro de Arte Contemporânea, Brumadinho, MG, Brazil
- JP Morgan Chase, New York, NY
- Laumeier Sculpture Park, Saint Louis, MO
- Los Angeles County Museum of Art, Los Angeles, CA
- Katzen American University Museum, Washington, DC, USA
- Laumeier Sculpture Park, Saint Louis, MO, USA
- Los Angeles County Museum of Art, Los Angeles, CA, USA
- The Mildred Lane Kemper Art Museum, Washington University in St. Louis, MO
- The MINT Museum, Charlotte, NC
- Minneapolis Institute of Art, MN
- Museo de Arte Contemporánea – MARCO, Monterrey, Mexico
- Museu Arte de Pampulha – MAP, Belo Horizonte, Brazil
- Museu de Arte Contemporânea – MAC, São Paulo, SP, Brazil
- Museu de Arte Moderna – MAM, Rio de Janeiro, RJ, Brazil
- Museu de Arte Moderna de Sao Paulo, Sao Paulo, Brazil
- Museu Extremeño e Iberoamericano de Arte Contemporáneo – MEIAC, Badojoz, Spain
- Museum of Contemporary Art – MOCA, San Diego, CA, USA
- New Mexico Museum of Art, Santa Fe, NM
- Pinacoteca Museum, Sao Paulo, Brazil
- Santa Barbara Museum of Art, Santa Barbara, CA
- Solomon Guggenheim Museum, New York, NY, USA
- Tate Modern, London, England, UK
- The National Museum of Women in the Arts, Washington DC, USA
- The Phillips Collection, Washington, DC, USA
- The Progressive Art Collection, Mayfield Village, OH
