= As Coletividades Anormais =

1939 book

- Author: Raimundo Nina Rodrigues
- Language: Portuguese
- Subject: Anthropology
- Published: 1939
- Publication place: Brazil

As Coletividades Anormais is a work by Raimundo Nina Rodrigues, a Brazilian coroner, psychiatrist, teacher, writer, anthropologist, and ethnologist, that was published in 1939.

The legacy of Nina Rodrigues (1862-1906) is overshadowed by his shared racist theories of racial superiority and the degeneration of mixed-race individuals. However, it is always with the caveat that his scientific and questioning spirit made him one of the first to equate supposedly hereditary factors with the poor social conditions of populations of African and Indigenous Brazilian descent. Unquestionably, his studies on The Africans in Brazil contributed uniquely to the understanding of the Afro-Brazilian culture that was emerging and which attempts were made, if not ignored, to combat. His contributions to criminal law are also relevant, particularly regarding the status of the insane or "mad of all kinds" of those unaccountable before the law. However, little is said about her contributions to social psychology, where among his studies is the posthumous work As Coletividades Anormais (The Abnormal Collectives), published by Editora Civilização Brasileira in Rio de Janeiro in 1939, 33 years after his death.

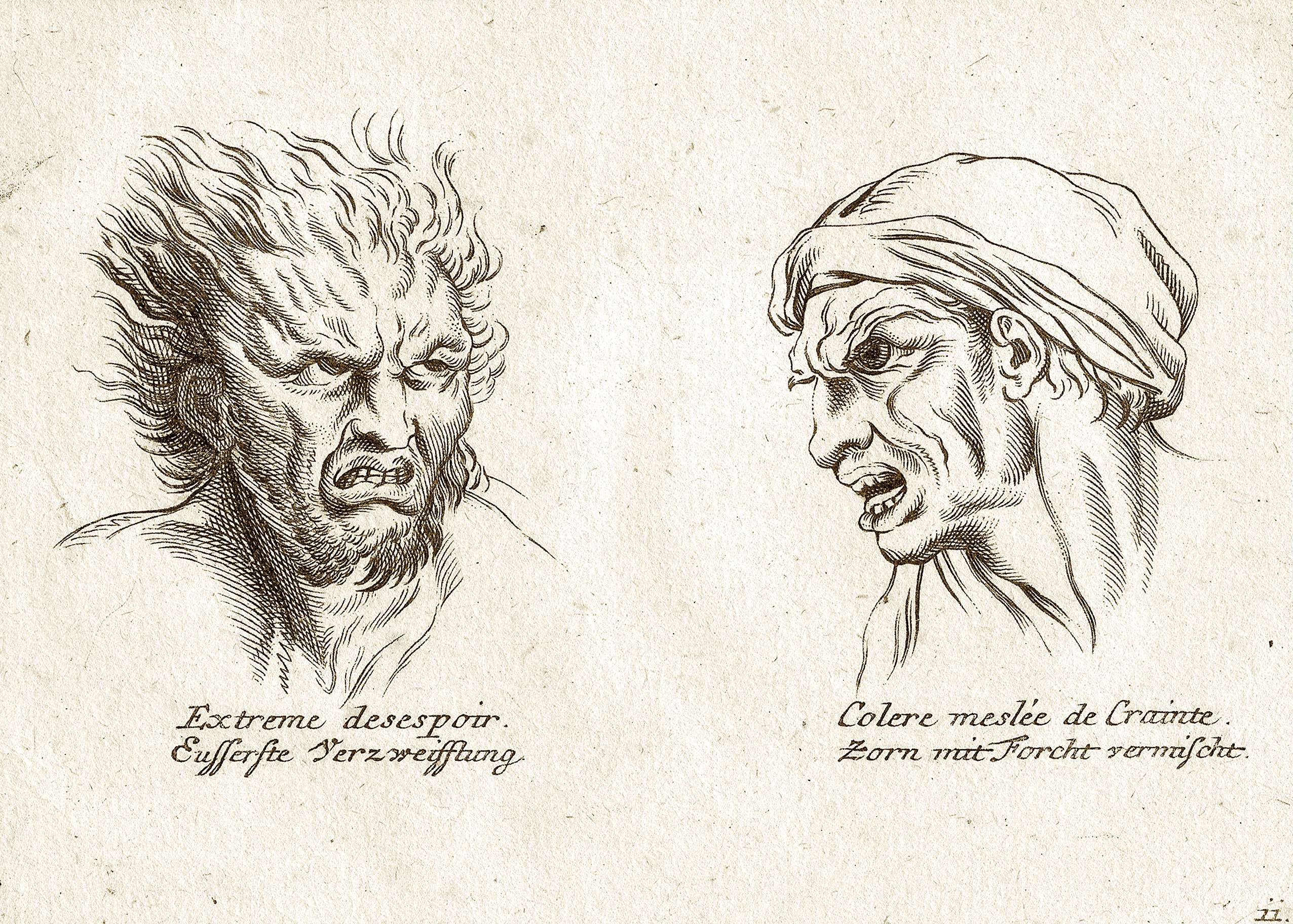
19th century illustration on physiognomy (Nina Rodrigues was one of the challengers of this theory, describing the normal skull of the "criminal" Lucas da Feira)

== History and plan of the work ==
In the preface to this collection, Arthur Ramos, the first professor of the first course and book on social psychology in Brazil (1937), refers to its international recognition. This places it among the classics of Gustave Le Bon (1841-1931), author of Psychology of Crowds, Scipio Sighele (1868-1913), and Gabriel Tarde (1843-1904), both of whom made significant contributions to the study of criminology and criminal associations. This highlights the relevance of Nina Rodrigues' contributions to religious epidemics, where her name is a mandatory citation, and to gregarious psychopathology.

Also, according to Ramos, in the preface to the aforementioned work, he repeatedly mentioned this book project, a draft of which he had recovered from among his manuscripts at the Nina Rodrigues Institute. The original plan for the work was divided as follows:

- PART 1 – Epidemic Madness
  - Chapter I – The Madness of the Mobs
  - Chapter II – The Epidemic of Religious Madness in Canudos and Pedra Bonita
- PART 2 – Criminal Associations in Brazil
  - Chapter I – The Abnormality of Criminals: Atavism in Criminal Degeneration. The Mutilating Murderers
  - Chapter II – The Crime of Two: Marcellino Bispo and Diocleciano Martyr
  - Chapter III – Brazilian Gangs: Their Barbaric and Medieval Aspects
  - Chapter IV – Urban Criminal Associations

Ramos, despite not finding the manuscripts of the work thus planned, recovered the texts published separately: on the epidemic of religious madness in Canudos and Pedra Bonita (Chapter II, Part I); on the crime committed by two: Marcellino Bispo and Diocleciano Martyr (Chapter II, Part II). He included a text on the gang of the fugitive slave Lucas da Feira, which certainly corresponds to what was intended about Brazilian gangs, their barbaric and medieval features (Chapter III, Part II). He brilliantly compensated for the absence of texts on epidemic madness, such as studies on "epidemic choreiform abasia" and "choreomania". Regarding atavism (Chapter I, Part II), also unavailable, he included the previously published text "Brazilian Mestizos," noting that if we replace the terms race with culture and miscegenation with acculturation, his concepts would acquire complete and perfect relevance. (Ramos, 1939).

The value of this work today is particularly noteworthy for understanding the psychosocial mechanisms of leadership and gang formation, from the perspective of social and community psychology, which remains to be evaluated, especially given the demand generated by the scale that organized crime has acquired in Brazil due to drug trafficking. It is also important to note the principles of multi-causal and interdisciplinary analysis, already outlined in Nina, so as not to fall into the reductionist trap of choosing a single cause (in this case, drugs). It is also essential to consider the socioeconomic and cultural conditions in which the populations involved live, as Nina Rodrigues himself did in some of these works, although giving too much importance to the "race" factor. This was without full agreement with the meanings in vogue, as shown with the craniometric analysis of Antonio Conselheiro. Conselheiro attested that he did not have "any anomaly that would reveal traces of degeneration" (o.c. p. 131), as well as that of the convicted criminal Lucas da Feira "with an absence of criminal characteristics in his skull" (o.c. p. 164), thus contributing to the revision of these theories and the paradigm of his time.

== Abnormal collectivities / collective psychology ==
Ramos (1939), in the preface to the aforementioned work, highlights the historical anticipation of Nina Rodrigues' work in the context of what came to be known as collective psychology or crowd psychology and social psychology. This demonstrates the complexity that these disciplines assumed with the diverse contributions that followed, from Wilhelm Wundt (1832-1920) with his psychology of peoples (Volkerpsychologie), to William McDougall (1871-1938), among others. He highlights in his course and book the contributions of Kurt Lewin (1890-1947) and psychoanalysis to the understanding of the phenomenon of the crowd and its leader. A possible definition of abnormal collectivity by Rodrigues (1939) is included within the scope of what he called collective psychology inaugurated by Scipio Sighele. It has as its objective to carry out the clinical study of the meneur (leader) and the crowd that follows him (p. 78), carrying out a complete study on the conditions and how the contagion of emotions is produced. This is to distinguish the different types of the state of crowd, namely: (1) anonymous and non-anonymous heterogeneous (2) homogeneous, including sects, castes, and classes. Adopting Le Bon's terminology and Sighele's proposition, they admit a succession from primitive crowds to large corporations and the modern state. Throughout the work, Nina Rodrigues also explores the relationship between psychosis, its isolating characteristics, and the apparent paradox of producing a collective delirium; the relationship between the generating social conditions and criminal tendencies (nate and innate); and presents considerations on hysteria and hypnosis, on relationships of complicity (the criminal pair), and the nature of suggestion/imitation. Artur Ramos's reconstruction certainly achieved the reconstruction objectives of Nina Rodrigues's work, "As Coletividades Anormales" (Abnormal Collectivities). However, to better understand the phenomenon studied, some other interpretations could be considered. Among these, the entire ethnographic description of the African populations ("Africans in Brazil" from 1932; "The Fetishistic Animism of Black Bahians" from 1900) and the article "Paranoia among the Black People", published in the Archives d'Anthropologie Criminelle, de Criminologie et de Psychologie Normale et Pathologique, Lyon, 1903, recently translated by Martha Gambini. The text "The Illusions of Catechism in Brazil," published in Revista Brasileira, Rio de Janeiro, 1896, could also be included, as it directly addresses issues of acculturation, in Ramos's proposed reinterpretation of miscegenation. From the perspective of bringing collective psychology closer to what is now understood as social medicine or collective health, it could include Nina Rodrigues' analyses of mental health services, especially: "Organization of the Republic's Medical Service," published in "Brasil Médico," Rio de Janeiro, 1981, and especially: "Medico-Legal Assistance to the Mentally Ill in Brazilian States" (published in Revista Brasil Médico, 1906). These could be understood as a response or reaction of the State to the demands for mental health care in the country, consolidating historiography as a way of understanding our current perspective.

== See also ==
- Cultural-historical psychology
- Criminal psychology
- War of Canudos
