= History of Candomblé =

Candomblé formed in the early part of the nineteenth century. Although African religions had been present in Brazil since the early 16th century, Johnson noted that Candomblé, as "an organized, structured liturgy and community of practice called Candomblé" only arose later.

== Origins ==
Candomblé originated among enslaved Africans transplanted to Brazil during the Atlantic slave trade. Slavery was widespread in West Africa; most slaves were prisoners of war captured in conflicts with neighbouring groups, although some were convicted criminals or those in debt. African slaves first arrived in Brazil in the 1530s, and were present in Bahia by the 1550s. Over the course of the trade, around four million Africans were transported to Brazil, an area that received more enslaved Africans than any other part of the Americas. Within Brazil itself, these Africans were most concentrated in Bahia.

In the 16th century, most of the enslaved came from the Guinea coast, but by the 17th century Angola and Congo populations had become dominant. Then, between 1775 and 1850, the majority of slaves were Yoruba and Dahomean, coming from the Gulf of Benin, largely in what is now Benin and Nigeria. Priests of the Oyo Empire were likely among the enslaved when the latter was attacked by Fulani and Fon groups. As the last wave of slaves, these Yoruba and Dahomean people became numerically dominant among Afro-Brazilians, resulting in their traditional cosmology becoming ascendant over that of longer established communities. On being brought to Brazil, these slaves were divided into "nations", primarily on their port of embarkation rather than their original etho-cultural identities. This process meant that Africans of different cultural backgrounds, regions, and religions were thrown together under a unifying term such as "Nagô", the latter used for those exported from the Bight of Benin.

Transportation merged deities venerated in different regions in Africa as part of the same pantheon. Whereas in Africa, people had generally venerated deities associated with their specific region, these commitments were broken up by enslavement and transportation. Of the thousands of orishas venerated in West Africa, this was cut down to a much smaller pantheon in Brazil. Which deities continued to be venerated probably depended on their continued relevance in the new Brazilian context. Orisha associated with agriculture were abandoned, probably because slaves had little reason to protect the harvests of slave-owners. By the 18th century, accounts of African-derived rituals performed in Brazil were common, at which point they were referred to generically as calundu, a term of Bantu origin. A 17th and 18th century ritual that incorporated drumming and spiritual possession, known as a Calundu, is believed to be an influence of Candomble's drumming works.

The Roman Catholic nature of Brazilian colonial society, which allowed for a cult of saints, may have permitted greater leeway for the survival of traditional African religions than were available in Protestant-dominant areas of the Americas. Many of the slaves learned to classify their orixás in relation to the Roman Catholic saints and the calendar of saints' days. There is no evidence that the slaves simply used the cult of saints to conceal orixá worship, but rather that devotees understood the two pantheons as comprising similar figures with similar abilities to fix certain problems. Some ecclesiastical figures in the Roman Catholic Church saw the syncretisation as a positive step in the process of converting the Africans to Christianity. The Christian teaching provided to enslaved Africans was often rudimentary. Among slave owners, there was also a belief that allowing the slaves to continue their traditional religions would allow old enmities between different African communities to persevere, thus making it less likely the slaves would unify and turn against the slave-owners. It was also thought that allowing the slaves to take part in their traditional customs would expend energies that might otherwise be directed toward rebellion. However, as steps were taken to convert the African populations to Christianity in Brazil, many Africans had been converted before being brought to the Americas. In Brazil, enslaved Africans and their descendants were also exposed to ceremonial magic practices from Iberia.

== 19th century ==
After enslaved Africans successfully led the Haitian Revolution, there were growing fears about similar slave revolts in Brazil. The 1820s and 1830s saw increased police repression of African-derived religions in Brazil. Laws introduced in 1822 allowed police to shut down batuques, or drumming ceremonies among the African population. It was during this period that the Engenho Velho ("Old Sugar Mill") terreiro was established; it was from this group that most Nagô terreiros descended. Various records indicated that Creoles and Whites were also sometimes taking part in the rites which the police were suppressing.

In 1822, Brazil declared itself independent of Portugal. Under British pressure, the Brazilian government passed the Quieróz law of 1850 which abolished the slave trade, although not slavery itself. In 1885 all slaves over the age of 60 were declared free, and in 1888 slavery was abolished. Although now free, life for Brazil's former slaves rarely improved. Various emancipated Yoruba began trading between Brazil and West Africa, and a significant role in the creation of Candomblé were several African freemen who were affluent and sent their children to be educated in Lagos. The first terreiros formed in early 19th-century Bahia. One of the oldest terreiros was the Ilê Axé Iyá Nassô Oká in Salvador, established by Marcelina da Silva, a freed African woman; this was probably active by the 1830s.

Brazil's first republican constitution was produced in 1891; based on the constitutions of France and the United States, it enshrined freedom of religion. However, Afro-Brazilian religious traditions continued to face legal issues; the Penal Code of 1890 had included prohibitions on Spiritism, magic, talismans, and much herbal medicine, impacting Candomblé. The authorities continued to shut down terreiros, claiming they were a threat to public health. The late 19th century saw the first terreiros open in Rio de Janeiro, a city then seeing a rapid expansion in its population. The period also saw various upper-class white Brazilians seeking out Candomblé.

== 20th and 21st centuries ==
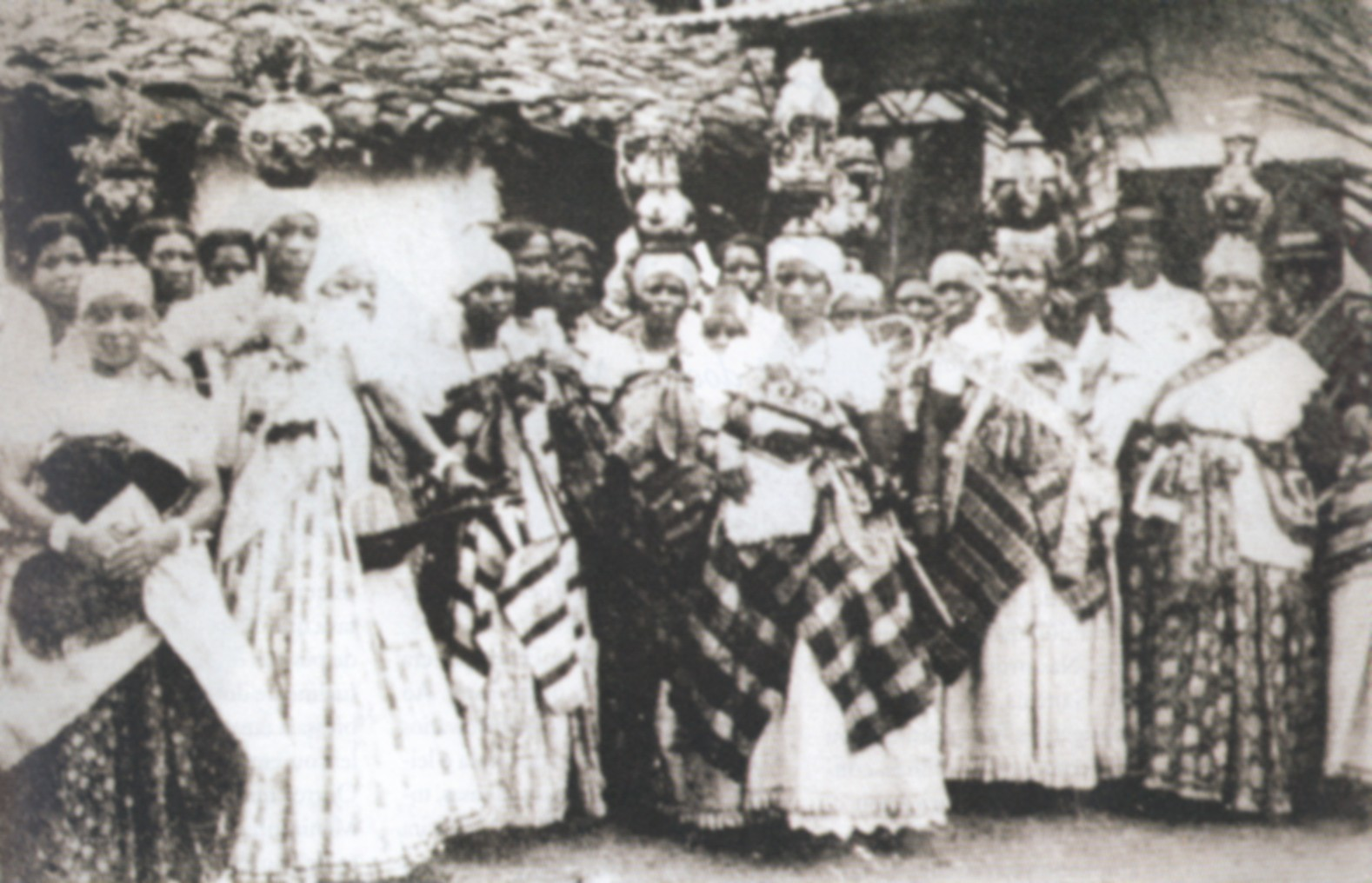
A group of practitioners photographed in 1902

Candomblé became increasingly public in the 1930s, partly because Brazilians were increasingly encouraged to perceive themselves as part of a multi-racial, mixed society in the midst of President Getúlio Vargas' Estado Novo project. Vargas approved the presidential Law Decree 1202, which recognized the legitimacy of terreiros and allowed them to practice. The Penal Code of 1940 gave additional protections to some terreiros.

By 1940, Johnson argued, Candomblé in its contemporary form was discernible. The 1930s saw a proliferation of academic studies on Candomblé by scholars like Raimundo Nina Rodrigues, Edison Carneiro, and Ruth Landes, with 20th-century studies focusing largely on the Nagô tradition. The growing literature, both scholarly and popular, helped document Candomblé but also contributed to its greater standardisation. The religion spread to new areas of Brazil during the 20th century. In São Paulo, for instance, there were virtually no Candomblé terreiros until the 1960s, reflecting the very small Afro-Brazilian population there, although this grew rapidly, to the extent that there were around 2500 terreiros in the city in the late 1980s and over 4000 by the end of the 1990s. Some practitioners became increasingly well known; the priestess Mãe Menininha do Gantois became nationally recognised, sometimes regarded as a symbol of Brazil. She had made efforts to improve the image of her terreiro, establishing an administrative directorate to facilitate public relations in 1926. During the 20th century, various organizations emerged to represent the terreiros, notably the Bahian Federation of the Afro-Brazilian Cults, the National Institute and Supreme Sacerdotal Organ of Afro-Brazilian Culture and Tradition, and the Conference of the Tradition and Culture of the Orixás.

By the late 20th century, Candomblé was increasingly respectable within Brazil. This was fuelled by well-educated Afro-Brazilians embracing their cultural heritage, by increased Brazilian trade with West Africa, and by the growing number of intellectual and white initiates. By the early 21st century, tourist literature increasingly portrayed Candomblé as an intrinsic part of Brazilian culture, especially in Salvador. References to the religion's beliefs became more apparent in Brazilian society; Varig Airlines for instance used the tagline "Fly with Axé." When the Internet emerged, various terreiros set up their own websites, while footage of Candomblé rituals were distributed through YouTube.

Growing links were also established with other African diasporic and West African religions, resulting in Brazilian involvement in the first International Congress of Orisha Tradition and Culture in Ifẹ, Nigeria in 1981. In the closing decades of the 20th century, some practitioners sought to remove Roman Catholic-influenced aspects from the religion to return it to its West African roots. The scholar of religion Stefania Capone referred to this as the "desyncretization movement". In 1983, the prominent priestess Mãe Stella Azevedo for instance called on adherents to renounce all Roman Catholic saints and transform Candomblé into a more purely African tradition. Many of those emphasising this Afrocentric perspective were white middle-class practitioners, who re-emphasised Africa as a new source of authority because they had little standing with the predominantly Afro-Brazilian Bahian Candomblé establishment. Many terreiros distinguished themselves from this approach, arguing that to abandon the Roman Catholic elements would be to abandon an important part of their religious ancestry.

The 2000s also saw growing opposition from Evangelical Protestants, including a rise in physical attacks on practitioners and terreiros; Candomblé practitioners responded with marches against religious intolerance from 2004 onward, with the first national march taking place in Salvador in 2009. In 2023, President Luiz Inácio Lula da Silva signed a law establishing 21 March as the National Day of Traditions of African Roots and Candomblé Nations.
