= Campo Santo Cemetery =

Cemetery in Salvador, Brazil

Cemetery of Campo Santo Cemitério do Campo Santo
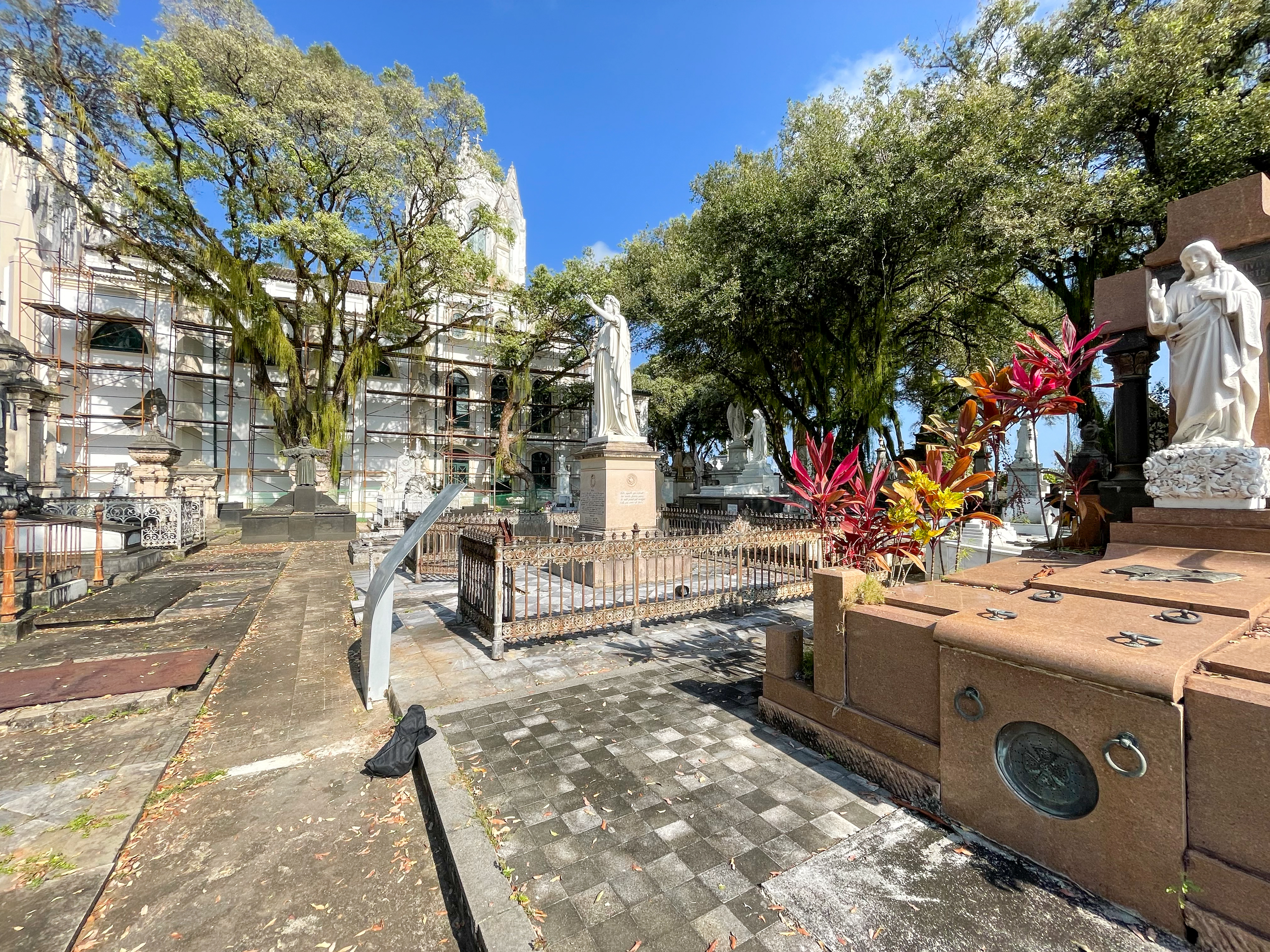
- View of the Cemetery of Campo Santo
- Interactive map of Cemetery of Campo Santo; Cemitério do Campo Santo

Details
- Established: 1836
- Location: Salvador, Bahia
- Country: Brazil
- Coordinates: 12.997919°S 38.514235°W
- Owned by: Santa Casa de Misericórdia of Bahia
- No. of graves: more than 40,000

The Cemetery of Campo Santo (Portuguese: Cemitério do Campo Santo) is a cemetery in Salvador, Bahia, Brazil. It is located in the Federação neighborhood of Salvador and is administered by the Santa Casa de Misericórdia da Bahia (Holy House of Mercy of Bahia), a branch of the Santa Casa da Misericórdia. Campo Santo is the oldest public cemetery in Salvador and one of the oldest in Brazil; it is also the largest in the Northeast region of the country. It covers 62,000 square metres (670,000 ft^{2}), has more than 40,000 burials, and continues to expand.

Campo Santo was the first municipal cemetery in Salvador and opened in 1836. It was created to meet the health concerns caused by burials in churches and convents, but the establishment of municipal cemeteries were unpopular across Brazil. A movement of adherents of religious brotherhoods and their sympathizers in Bahia known as "Cemiterada" invaded and almost totally destroyed the cemetery during its construction. The "Cemiterada" destroyed the entire front wall and part of the chapel. The Santa Casa acquired Campo Santo in 1840, and the following year began its reconstruction of the cemetery. The Santa Casa de Misericórdia of Bahia maintains ownership of the cemetery. The cemetery continues to expand; a new area was added in 2017.

== Chapel ==
Construction of the current chapel was only completed in 1870 due to the lack of resources of the Santa Casa. It was designed by the architect Carlos Croezy and built in the Gothic revival style. Croezy was also the architect for the Hospital Santa Izabel in Salvador. The chapel was inaugurated on June 6, 1874, and is the highlight of the architecture of Campo Santo.

== Mausoleum of the Family of the Barão de Cajaíbas and the "Image of Faith" statue ==
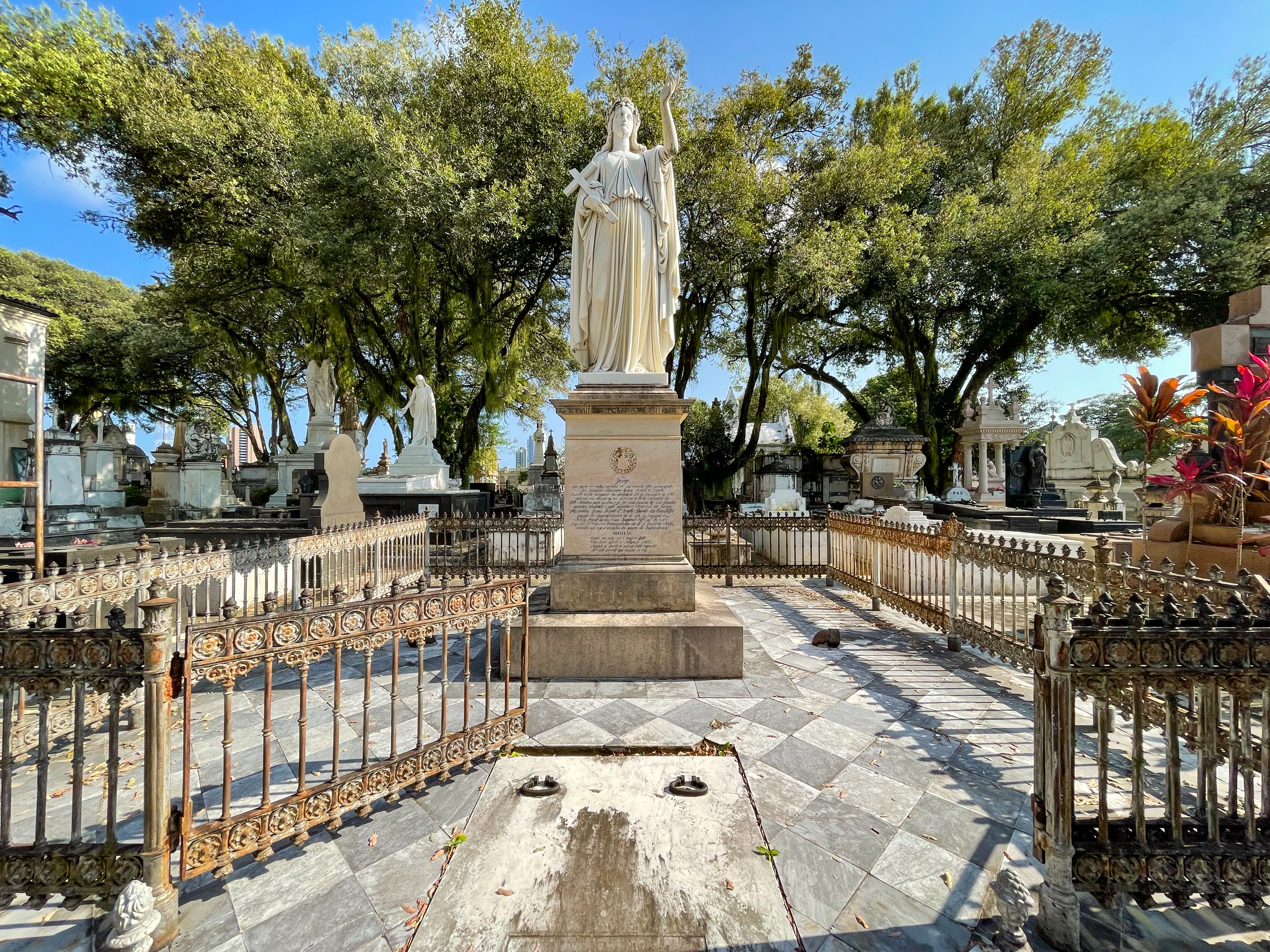
Mausoleum of the Family of the Barão de Cajaíbas and the "Image of Faith" statue

Campo Santo has a large collection of funerary art and objects from the 19th and 20th century. Most notable is the Mausoleum of the Family of the Barão de Cajaíbas, which includes the "Image of Faith" statue. The mausoleum is of Carrara marble. It consists of a crypt, pedestal, and life-size statue of Faith. The statue was executed by the German Classicist sculptor Johann Halbig (1814–1882). The mausoleum and statue were listed as a Brazilian federally protected historic structure by the National Historic and Artistic Heritage Institute in 1966.

== Subsequent cemeteries in Salvador ==
Numerous cemeteries were built in Salvador and the islands within its borders after Campo Santos.

- Municipal cemeteries are located in the neighborhoods of Brotas, Plataforma, Periperi, Itapuã, Pirajá and Paripe
- Islands within the geographic borders of the city: Bom Jesus, Ilha de Maré, Ponta de Nossa Senhora, and Paramana
- A state cemetery, the Quinta dos Lázaros Public Cemetery
- The religious orders (irmandades) of Salvador own their own cemeteries, notable that of the third orders of Carmel and Saint Francis.
- The British Cemetery of Bahia (1814), which has both Protestant and Jewish burials
- An additional Jewish cemetery was opened adjacent to Campo Santo, the Cemitério Israelita da Bahia. The Memorial to the Holocaust (Memorial do Holocausto, 2009, Sérgio Kopinski Ekerman) is located in the cemetery.

== Noted burials ==
- Antônio Carlos Magalhães, governor of Bahia
- Castro Alves, poet and playwright
- Domingos Borges de Barros, lawyer, writer, diplomat
- Henriqueta Martins Catharino, educator and writer
- Luiz Eduardo Magalhães, politician
- Juliano Moreira, psychiatrist, often considered the pioneer of psychoanalysis in Brazil
