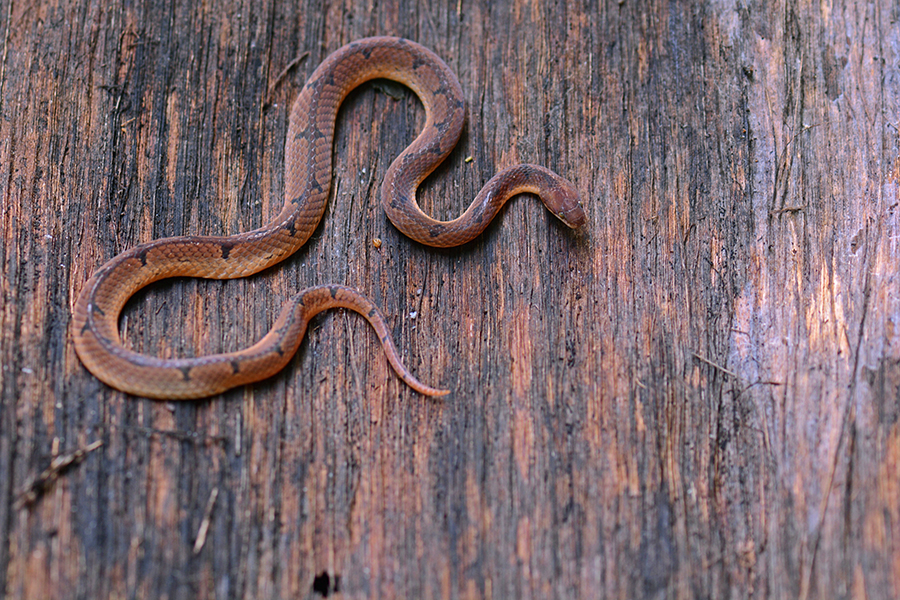

Scientific classification
- Kingdom: Animalia
- Phylum: Chordata
- Class: Reptilia
- Order: Squamata
- Suborder: Serpentes
- Family: Colubridae
- Subfamily: Dipsadinae
- Genus: Xenopholis; W. Peters, 1869

= Xenopholis =

Genus of snakes

Xenopholis is a genus of rear-fanged snakes of the family Colubridae.

== Geographic range ==
The genus Xenopholis is endemic to South America.

== Description ==
The genus Xenopholis is characterized by distinctive vertebrae. The spinous processes are expanded dorsally, forming shields which are rugose and divided by a median groove.

== Species ==
Three species are recognized as being valid.

- Xenopholis scalaris (Wucherer, 1861) - Wucherer's ground snake
- Xenopholis undulatus (Jensen, 1900) - Jensen's ground snake
- Xenopholis werdingorum Jansen, L. Álvarez & Köhler, 2009

Nota bene: A binomial authority in parentheses indicates that the species was originally described in a genus other than Xenopholis.
