= O. E. H. Wucherer =

Brazilian physician and biologist (1820–1873)

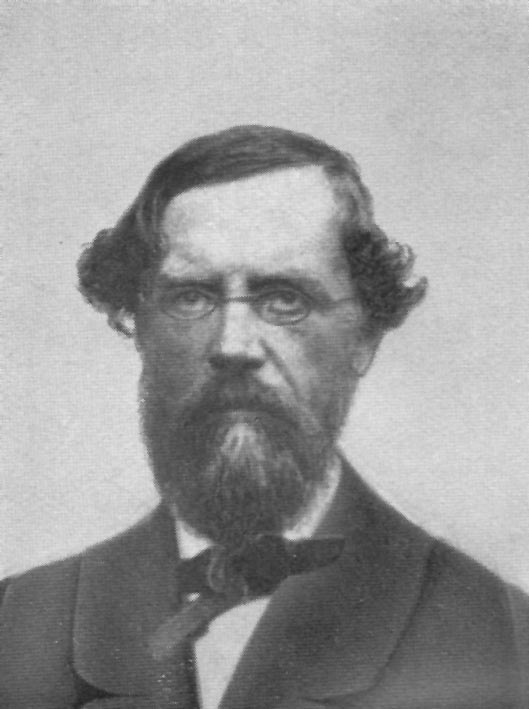
Otto Wucherer

Otto Edward Henry Wucherer (7 July 1820 – 7 May 1873) was a Brazilian medical doctor and naturalist, born to a Dutch mother and German father.

== Biography ==
He was born in Porto, later moving to Hamburg, where he worked in a pharmacy. He studied medicine at the University of Tübingen, receiving his doctorate in 1841 as a pupil of Ferdinand Gottlieb von Gmelin. He later practiced in London at St Bartholomew's Hospital and in Lisbon. In 1843 he relocated to Brazil, eventually settling as a doctor in Salvador, Bahia, where he lived until 1871. Together with John Ligertwood Paterson and José Francisco da Silva Lima, he co-founded the Escola Tropicalista da Bahia at the Faculty of Medicine of Bahia.

He discovered the filaria larvae in Bahia. His name is associated with the roundworm genus Wuchereria, and he is commemorated in the scientific names of two species of reptiles, Elapomorphus wuchereri and Leposternon wuchereri. He described the snake species Atractus guentheri and Xenopholis scalaris.

He was co-founder of the journal Gazeta Médica da Bahia.

== Taxon named in his honor ==
- Hypostomus wuchereri is a species of catfish in the family Loricariidae. It is native to South America, where it occurs in the Paraguaçu River basin in Brazil.
