= Raimundo Nina Rodrigues =

Brazilian intellectual (1862–1906)

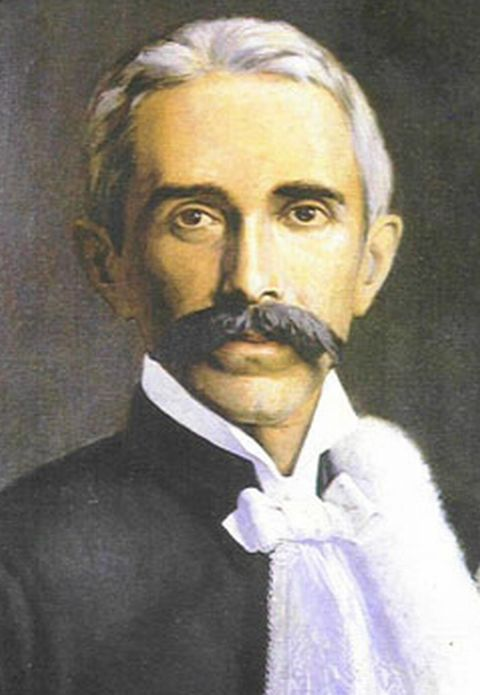
- Born: 4 December 1862; Vargem Grande, Maranhão, Empire of Brazil
- Died: 17 July 1906 (aged 43); Paris, France
- Education: Faculty of Medicine, Federal University of Bahia
- Known for: Os Africanos no Brasil
- Scientific career
- Fields: Coroner, psychiatrist, teacher, writer, anthropologist and ethnologist

Raimundo Nina Rodrigues (4 December 1862 – 17 July 1906) was a Brazilian coroner, psychiatrist, teacher, writer, anthropologist and ethnologist. A notable eugenicist, he was also a dietologist, tropicalist, sexologist, hygienist, biographer and epidemiologist.

Nina Rodrigues is considered the founder of Brazilian criminal anthropology and a pioneer in studies on black culture in the country. A nationalist, he was the first Brazilian scholar to address the theme of black people as a relevant social issue for understanding the racial formation of the Brazilian population, despite adopting a racist, nationalist, scientistic and deterministic perspective, in his book Os Africanos no Brasil (1890–1905).

== Life ==
His parents were Colonel Francisco Solano Rodrigues and Dona Luísa Rosa Nina Rodrigues, who is believed to be a descendant of a group of Jews fleeing persecution in the Iberian Peninsula. Nina was born on the Primavera Farm, in the municipality of Vargem Grande, Maranhão, where he spent his childhood under the care of his Black godmother, who helped his mother with her seven children. He married Maria Amélia Couto Nina Rodrigues, known as Dona Maricas, and the couple had only one daughter, Alice, who died soon after her father. He was also the son-in-law of Councilor Almeida Couto and brother-in-law of Alfredo Thomé de Britto, director of the Bahia School of Medicine from 21 August 1901 to 4 June 1908. He was married to Dona Júlia de Almeida Couto Britto.

He studied at Colégio São Paulo and at Seminário das Mercês in São Luís. According to his own accounts and those of his classmates, he appears to have been in poor health. In 1882, he enrolled at the Bahia School of Medicine, continuing his studies until 1885, when he transferred to Rio de Janeiro to complete his fourth year of medical school. He returned to Bahia the following year, where he wrote his first article, on leprosy in Maranhão — "A Morphéa em Anajatuba (Maranhão)".

Returning to Rio in 1887, he completed his studies on 10 February 1888, defending his thesis, "Amiotrophias de Origem Periférica" (Amyotrophias of Peripheral Origin), on three cases of progressive paralysis in a family. In 1888, he practiced medicine in São Luís, maintaining an office on the former Rua do Sol, present-day Nina Rodrigues Street. In Maranhão, he conducted research on the local eating patterns, publishing his results in the newspaper Pacotilha. Because of one of these articles, in which he attributed the health problems of the poor population to poor nutrition, he was nicknamed "Dr. Dry Flour". In 1889, he became an adjunct professor of Clinical Medicine at the Bahia School of Medicine. During this time, he dedicated himself to writing articles for the Bahia Medical Gazette, becoming its director in 1891. That same year, he was transferred to the chair of Public Health, becoming a professor of forensic medicine. He attempted several times to create a specific qualification for medical experts, which only came to fruition years later. Misunderstood and hostile to his fellow doctors, he decided to escape the provincialism and the derisory nickname, returning that same year to Bahia, which would be his permanent home.

On 5 April 1906, Rodrigues was appointed as a delegate to represent the Bahia School of Medicine at the Fourth International Congress of Public and Private Assistance, which was scheduled to take place in Milan, Italy, from May 23 to 27. Nina's health was deteriorating after contracting a serious infection during a trip to Conde, on the northern coast of Bahia. To recover from the infection, he traveled to the city of Alagoinhas, 100 km from the Bahian capital. Days later, he returned to Salvador in better health to receive the university's invitation. However, on the day of departure for Europe, he was pale and weak, despite his recovery. His wife, Maria Amélia Couto Nina Rodrigues, and their daughter, Alice Nina Rodrigues, who was twelve at the time, embarked with him. During the sea voyage, the disease progressed and on the night of disembarkation, upon arriving in Lisbon on May 17, Nina suffered a hemoptysis crisis, which is when a quantity of blood from the airways and lungs passes through the glottis. Upon arriving in Portugal, he received medical attention. A lung X-ray ruled out possible pulmonary tuberculosis, and a newspaper in the Portuguese capital, "Correo da Europa," published in its edition that Nina suffered from liver cancer. Although the newspaper stated this, medical diagnoses also pointed to possible calculous cholecystitis. The solution was surgery, which Nina refused. At the time, Paris was the most advanced health center on the European continent, so the doctor from Maranhão traveled to France on June 19 and was well received by his colleagues. In France, as the disease progressed, he received various diagnoses, such as dilation of the heart and aorta, tuberculosis of the pericardium, areolar abscess of the liver, and tuberculosis of the pleura, pericardium, and diaphragm. Despite the illness, he remained obstinate in his duties. Days after his illness improved, Nina Rodrigues went to visit suppliers of the instruments that would equip the future forensic medical institute that was under construction in the city of Salvador. On July 10, while attending autopsies and gathering information to implement more advanced services in Bahia, Nina suddenly fell ill and fainted. Three days later, in his room at the Nouvel Hotel, he suffered another bout of hemoptysis and told friends around three in the morning that "this is the beginning of the end." Visits to Nina's room were suspended, and only a doctor residing in Paris, whose name is unknown, and his Brazilian colleague, Dr. Eduardo Moraes, were present during his final moments. Before dying, he requested a priest and told his wife to return to Brazil with the family of his friend, Dr. Eduardo de Moraes.

=== Death ===
Raimundo Nina Rodrigues died in France at 7:00 a.m. on July 17, 1906. Professor Brouadel, one of the forensic doctors Rodrigues most admired and who held the position of dean of the Paris School of Medicine, was responsible for the autopsy and the return of the body to Brazil. Since transportation between continents was time-consuming, Nina's body had to be embalmed for the long journey. News of his death reached Brazil by telegram and shocked the entire medical profession. As soon as the dean of the Bahia School of Medicine, Dr. Alfredo Tomé de Britto, heard the news, he suspended classes and lowered the national flag to half-mast. The burial took place in Bahia on August 11 of the same year, almost a month after his death. Nina's body was received with great honor in the capital of Bahia and due to its importance, in a request to the Ministry of the Interior, the students of the Faculty of Medicine of Bahia requested that all costs related to the funeral be paid by the federal government, since he had gone abroad representing the country on an official trip, however all expenses were paid by the academic community of Bahia. In the currency of the time, the expenses from the transfer of the body to the burial cost approximately 20,000 contos de réis. Upon arriving at the port of Salvador, the body followed in a funeral procession to the Monastery of São Bento, where it arrived at 6 p.m. At the Benedictine monastery, Nina's wake was held with the help of a rotation of fifteen college classes, each with fifteen students, until the time of the mass, after which they departed for the cemetery. The body was buried in the Campo Santo Cemetery, in the Federação neighborhood, where today stands a white tombstone of the man considered the founder of forensic medicine in Bahia.

=== Salvador: Tropicalist, Forensic Scientist, and Anthropologist ===
In Salvador, which had more than two thousand Africans registered at the time of the abolition of slavery (1888), he also dedicated himself to clinical medicine and to serving the underprivileged, mostly Black population, and was then called Doctor of the Poor.

In 1889, he took the exam for the Faculty of Medicine of Bahia, becoming an assistant professor of Clinical Medicine, held by Councilor José Luís de Almeida Couto, a longtime republican, abolitionist, and nationally renowned politician.

Below is a paleographic transcription of the handwritten letter from Nina Rodrigues containing information about his appointment and induction as a professor at the Bahia School of Medicine in 1889:

Record of the Letter from Dr. Raymundo Nina Rodrigues

"Considering the merit and qualifications demonstrated by Dr. Raymundo Nina Rodrigues in the competitive examination, I hereby appoint him to the position of assistant to the 2nd chair of clinical medicine at the Bahia School of Medicine, with the salary due to him. Palace of Rio de Janeiro, on September 6, 1889, the sixty-eighth of Independence and the Empire. With the signature of His Majesty the Emperor, Baron of Loreto. Fulfilled and recorded. Palace of the Presidency of Bahia, September 27, 1889, Almda Coreto. No. 2032. 3rd of. Paid thirty thousand reis, Re. and Provincial B. September 27, 1889. The Faithful. A. Guimarães. The clerk. N. Carneiro da Rocha. Registered at fl 216 N of the book of imperial diplomas. Secretariat of the Government of Bahia, September 28, 1889. C. Seabra. Comply and register. Bahia and Faculty of Medicine September 28, 1889. Dr. José Olimpio. Took the oath and took office on September 28, 1889. Dr. T. A. Gaspar."de setembro de 1889. Dr. T. A. Gaspar."

But his object of study and research lay outside the physical confines of the academic institution. Therefore, he refused to give up on the hardships of the population excluded from the center of power, no matter how much criticism he received. "Nina is crazy! He frequents Candomblés, sleeps with the inhaôs [sic], and eats the food of the orixás," was a typical remark from the petty squabbles of his fellow professors, as recounted by his disciple and admirer Estácio de Lima in the book "Old and New Nina." In his manuscripts, he emphasized the role of women in Candomblé circles, especially when discussing Salvador's best-known terreiros, located in the neighborhoods of Gantois, Engenho Velho, and Garcia. According to him, it was necessary to note that all these spaces were led by mothers-of-saints, citing the names of the mothers-of-saints Julia, Isabel, Livaldina, Thecla, the mother of Calçada do Bonfim, among others, reinforcing the idea that the "African Salvador" had many female leaders.

In a time marked by racial intolerance, the professor at the Bahia School of Medicine demonstrated affection for Black culture and a scientific perspective on religions of African origin. He visited terreiros in Salvador and the Bahian Recôncavo region, using them as research sites. According to writer Lilia Schwarcz, Nina sought to make his theses not a personal matter, but a scientific subject, amply expanded upon in the bibliography of the time. He never excluded the ideology of Black inferiority and, after his death, left a legacy as the founder of Brazilian anthropology, but also as the "first ethnographer of urban Brazil," for having left a "detailed and credible ethnography of Afro-Brazilian religion."

After the end of the Canudos War, Antônio Conselheiro's skulls were exhumed in 1897 and sent to the Bahia School of Medicine for study, where it was hoped to find signs of "innate criminality," according to the conception of criminal anthropology at the time. Along with the director of the faculty, Pacífico Pereira, and the psychiatrist Juliano Moreira, Nina Rodrigues' diagnosis did not inspire "any abnormality that demonstrates traces of degeneration".

Nina Rodrigues and Alfredo Thomé de Britto, also a physician and later dean of the Bahia School of Medicine, married daughters of Counselor Almeida Couto. The family says that each of them had previously been engaged to the sister who would marry the other. Their studies were so important that a school of thought was established on the subject: the Nina Rodrigues School. His powerful and original intellectual work earned him many disciples, most of whom were admirers of this professional. Throughout his career, he was a professor at the Federal University of Bahia in 1889; he was a full member and vice-president of the New York Legal Medical Society; an honorary member of the National Academy of Medicine in Rio de Janeiro; and a foreign member of the Societé Médico Psychologique in Paris, in addition to belonging to the Tropicalist School of Bahia.

In Salvador, the so-called Bahian Tropicalist School, was a group formed around 1860 around the Gazeta Médica da Bahia (Medical Gazette of Bahia). The group was informally composed of physicians who dedicated themselves to researching the etiology of tropical diseases that affected the country's poor, especially black slaves. The group developed anatomopathological studies. Initially, Nina dedicated himself to research on beriberi, defending Pasteur's microbial doctrine; but he eventually abandoned this work, citing a lack of specialized personnel and laboratory equipment necessary to keep up with developments in medical science, based on the discoveries of Pasteur, Koch (1843-1910), Claude Bernard (1813-1878), and others. He left the group in 1897, after having served as the main contributor to the Gazeta Médica da Bahia, of which he was director between 1890 and 1893, having published articles on topics that were part of the tropicalists' agenda, such as beriberi and leprosy, in addition to addressing the most prevalent diseases in Brazil and the need for reform of the health system in Bahia.

In a second foray into the racial classification of the population, this time on a national level, in an article published in 1890 in the Gazeta Médica and Brazil Médico of Rio de Janeiro, the heading anthropology—"pathological anthropology"—appears for the first time. He also writes a note supporting the initiative of Brás do Amaral — professor of Elements of Anthropology at the Instituto de Instrução Secundária in Salvador — to start a collection of "anthropological objects"—skeletons, tufts of hair, and skin clippings from the state's Indigenous people. At the Third Brazilian Congress of Medicine and Surgery, held in Salvador in October of that year, and of whose executive committee Nina Rodrigues had been elected treasurer by the Faculty's Congregation, he would present three papers — one of which was the report of an autopsy he had performed—the only one performed during an influenza epidemic that had recently occurred in Bahia.

Nina Rodrigues's departure marks the end of the Bahian Tropicalist School. From then on, he devoted himself to studies of Brazilian biosociology, in which the biological was understood as a determinant of the social, drawing inspiration from the theories of Cesare Lombroso (1836-1909) in forensic medicine and Wilhelm Wundt (1832-1920) in social psychology—theories that formed part of a racist framework regarding the superiority of the white race, based on a questionable interpretation of the ideas of Herbert Spencer (1820-1903), Charles Darwin (1809-1882), and Francis Galton (1822-1911). Rodrigues's studies thus focused on issues of race and culture in general, and crime in particular, drawing on, in addition to these theories, the positivist precepts of Auguste Comte. It was concluded that racial heritage was not only the key to predisposition to certain diseases, but that Africans and mixed-race peoples were also more predisposed to crime. Although his argument about the inferiority of the Black race was not scientifically proven, Nina Rodrigues' scientific work was recognized and respected for his pioneering work in studies dedicated to Afro-Brazilian culture. He gathered important information in the areas of literature, ethnography, folklore, politics, customs and philosophy, at a time when there was a concern about denying African influences in Brazilian culture.

=== Legal Medicine ===
In 1891, Rodrigues assumed the chair of Public Medicine — previously occupied by Virgílio Damásio. Some time later, he assumed the chair of forensic medicine, whose creation had been proposed by Damásio and later retired. Together with a group of doctors including Alfredo Britto, Juliano Moreira, Pacheco Mendes, among others, he promoted the founding of the Bahia Society of Forensic Medicine, of which he was president. At the same time, he also created the Bahia Journal of Forensic Medicine, a journal of the society, of which he became a member of the editorial board. Both initiatives would disappear two years after their creation. With Damásio's retirement, he since then dedicated himself to implementing the proposals of his predecessor who, after visiting several European countries, had suggested, in his report of the visit, the implementation of practical teaching and the appointment of forensic medicine professors as police experts. In forensic medicine, as in everything else, he promoted important transformations. Afrânio Peixoto tells us that Nina "gave such luster to the specialty that, throughout the country, it was the most coveted chair."

In 1904, he again appealed to Congress for the importance of regulating the role of forensic experts, so as to unify procedural laws in Rio de Janeiro, then the federal capital. He compiled several forensic cases, which were published in the Revista dos Cursos (Review of Courses). The same journal also published the terms of the agreement between the Faculty and the Secretariat of Public Security so that police forensic examinations could be conducted under his direction, as a professor of Forensic Medicine. These would be the first formal documents relating to a collaboration between the Faculty and the police.

With the results of his studies, he proposed a reformulation of the concept of criminal liability, suggested reforming forensic examinations, and pioneered forensic care for the mentally ill. He also advocated for the application of psychiatric expertise not only in asylums but also in courts. Furthermore, he analyzed in depth the problems of Black people in Brazil, establishing a model on the subject.

The Nina Rodrigues Forensic Medical Institute (IMLNR), the oldest of the four agencies that make up the structure of the Bahia Technical Police Department, was created (1906) by Prof. Oscar Freire and named Nina Rodrigues by the Congregation of the Bahia School of Medicine, in honor of the eminent professor of Forensic Medicine, who died that same year at the age of 44.

Nina Rodrigues's unique position in the history of Brazilian anthropological thought (which should be attributed to works such as Human Races and Criminal Responsibility in Brazil, Fetish Animism of Black People in Bahia, and Africans in Brazil) was studied by Professor Mariza Corrêa (Unicamp) in The Illusions of Freedom: The Nina Rodrigues School and Anthropology in Brazil

Much of Rodrigues's work was destroyed in a fire in January 1905, which occurred in part of the Bahia School of Medicine's facilities. The Forensic Medicine laboratory, where Rodrigues worked, was amidst all this destruction. According to the newspaper of the time, the Diário da Bahia, “several of his works of scientific importance were consumed by the fire; a laborious collection of human bones, around 50, measured and treated; the head of Antonio Conselheiro, the skull of Lucas da Feira, as well as another collection of selected skulls, which was an enormous loss.”

With Nina's death, his successor, Oscar Freire, revalidated the agreements in 1907, and they were automatically renewed in the following years. With this action, the role of the expert was appropriated by the Faculty of Medicine of Bahia, which would later be followed by the cities of Rio de Janeiro and São Paulo, after much effort by Nina's students, Oscar Freire and Afrânio Peixoto. However, almost 60 years later, the activities of forensic medicine returned to the hands of the Public Security departments.

=== Perspective on Black People ===
Nina Rodrigues distinguished himself through his studies, sparking debates in Brazilian society about the formation of its multiracial composition in the country that was still being constructed. Between 1870 and 1930, Brazil was dominated by intellectual productions focusing on racial issues, aiming to better understand how Brazilian society was formed. In the historical period between 1870 and 1910, Rodrigues' ethnographic, psychopathological, forensic, and anthropometric studies stand out, representing the construction of a modern Brazil. This period coincided with the abolition of slavery (1888), and the presence of Black and mixed-race Brazilians began to be considered a problem, as many theories originating from abroad pointed to the formation of a mixed-race country with a tropical climate, creating the expectation of a country that would not succeed. Soon, it became a field of study from a scientific point of view, with its focus on the theory of degeneration and climatic and racial determinism.

For over a decade, the ethnologist conducted research on issues related to the recovery of the memory of the Black population in Brazil. His activities included investigating the origins of deported slaves, researching the languages spoken in the tribes, and their customs and traditions. One of his activities was conducting oral history through interviews in different regions of Bahia, with the aim of recording the lives, habits, and daily lives of Africans. He also attempted to decipher the enigma created by the Portuguese to conceal the reality of the slave trade. Nina dedicated much of his life to writing his texts on Black people in Bahia, which forced him to confront local prejudice. For this, according to Bahian tradition, he received the nickname "negreiro" (slave trader) because of the development of his research. Nina Rodrigues defended ideas that today might be described as racist, but at the time, were considered scientific and advanced. He was strongly influenced by the ideas of the Italian criminologist Cesare Lombroso. In the year slavery was abolished, he wrote: "Equality is false; equality exists only in the hands of jurists." In 1894, he published an essay arguing that different penal codes should exist for different races.

Nina Rodrigues was one of the pioneers of criminal anthropology, anthropometry, and phrenology in Brazil. In 1899, he published Mestiçagem, Degenerescência e Crime, seeking to prove his theories on the degeneration and criminal tendencies of Black and mixed-race people. His other published titles also leave no doubt about his objectives: Pathological Anthropology: The Mixed-Race People and Physical and Mental Degeneration among Mixed-Race People in Hot Lands. For him, Black and mixed-race people were the cause of Brazil's inferiority.

In his magnum opus, Africans in Brazil, he wrote: "To give it [slavery] this impressive aspect, it was necessary or convenient to lend the Black person the psychic organization of the most cultured white peoples (…) The most noble feeling of sympathy and pity, magnified to the proportions of an enormous avalanche in the collective suggestion of an entire people, had conferred upon the Black person (…) qualities, feelings, moral gifts, or ideas that he did not have and could not have; and in that emergency, there was no appeal from such a sentence, for sentimental exaltation left neither time nor calm for reflection and reasoning."

According to Nina, the inferiority of Black people—and of non-white people— was "a perfectly natural phenomenon, a product of the uneven progress of the phylogenetic development of humanity in its various divisions and sections." In Brazil, the Aryans were to fulfill the mission of preventing the masses of Black and mixed-race people from interfering in the country's destiny. "Aryan civilization is represented in Brazil by a weak minority of the white race, tasked with defending it (…) from the antisocial acts of the inferior races, whether these are true crimes in the eyes of these races or, on the contrary, manifestations of the conflict, the struggle for existence between the superior civilization of the white race and the sketches of civilization of the conquered or subjugated races."

Nina Rodrigues is identified with the character, Professor Nilo Argolo, from Jorge Amado's book Tent of Miracles. The title of the book written by the character is Mestiçagem, Degenerescência e Crime, which directly links him to Nina Rodrigues.

=== Theoretical Production ===
It is estimated that his work includes around sixty books and articles on topics spanning various medical specialties, particularly forensic medicine, anthropology, law, psychology, and sociology, published in periodicals such as the Gazeta Médica da Bahia (of which he was editor-in-chief); Jornal do Comércio; Revista Médica de São Paulo; Revista Brazileira; and Revista Médico Legal da Bahia (a journal of the Society, of which he was a member of the editorial board). There were also international publications in the South American journals La Semana Médica and Archivos de Criminologia, Medicina Legal y Psichiatria, in Buenos Aires; and European editions, such as the Italian Archivio di Psichiatria, Scienze Penali e Antropologia Criminale, in Turin, and the Annales de la Societé de Médicine Légale de Belgique, in Belgium. Some of his works published in French are still unpublished in Portuguese, such as "Atavisme psychique et paranóia", published in the Archives de Anthropologie Criminel de Lion in 1902 and "La paranóia chez les nègres", published the following year in the same journal. Articles were also published in the Parisian journals Annales Médico-Psychologiques, Annales d’Hygiène Publique et de Médicine Légale. Among his books, the following stand out: As raças humanas e a responsabilidade penal no Brasil (Human Races and Criminal Responsibility in Brazil) (1894), O animismo fetichista dos negros da Bahia (Fetish Animism of Black People in Bahia) (1900) and Os Africanos no Brasil (The Africans in Brazil) (1932).

Considering the author's twenty years of literary production, his work can be classified into four broad areas: forensic medicine, forensic psychiatry, and physical anthropology; studies of public health organization; studies of comparative psychopathology; and the ethnography of the African peoples of Bahia. Of all the themes mentioned above, the one that was most representative and encompassed his entire body of work was crime among Black and mixed-race individuals. Rodrigues studied various cases of crimes involving Black and mixed-race individuals by examining the bodies, minds, and life stories of each individual, attempting to understand the true motivations that led people to commit crimes. Following this line of research, in 1899, Rodrigues wrote the article "Mestiçagem, Degenerescência e Crime" (Mestizaje, Degenerescência e Crime). In it, the author cited cases of crimes committed by mixed-race individuals. Through the article, he sought to differentiate the influence of degeneration on the perpetrators. To carry out this analysis, he carried out craniometric and physiognomic studies of the criminals, based on the parameters of criminology. In this way, he analyzed the cases and, through his thesis, confirmed that there is no individual responsibility, and therefore they should be mitigated, since the crimes are the product of the interbreeding of distinct races, which causes recurring degeneration due to this interbreeding.

At the time, there was a broad debate between monogenists—people who did not believe in evolution and were attached to the idea that there was a gradient of perfection, ranging from perfect to less perfect people, starting from a common ancestor—and polygenists, who were concerned with science, believed that humans were the result of biological and natural laws, causing different human origins. Therefore, Nina Rodrigues wanted to raise the question of whether or not mixed-race individuals were eugenic—that is, whether they had the capacity to bring improvement to their descendants—with the idea of bringing about the debate about whether mixed-race individuals were a normal and socially viable product or whether they formed an inferior, incapable, and degenerate race.

Thanks to one of his publications, entitled "Epidemiologist: Historical Study of Beriberi Outbreaks in a Mental Health Home in Bahia," published in the Revista dos Cursos and the Diário da Bahia, Nina was able to save lives. The professor at the School of Medicine described the beriberi epidemic that killed half the population of the São João de Deus Asylum in Salvador. As a result of his campaign, patients with psychiatric problems were saved through an agreement between the school and the state government for the construction of a new hospital. Nina Rodrigues played a key role in this process, serving on the commission appointed for planning. In addition to Nina, Antonio Pacífico Pereira and Luiz Pinto de Carvalho were also members of the committee that produced the report. In summary, the commission's report, which was published in the Revista dos Cursos and delivered to director Alfredo Britto, described what the asylum's layout should be like, characterized how it would operate, and detailed the planning for the organization of Psychiatric Clinical teaching and the State's asylum for the insane.

Nina Rodrigues also analyzed the probable hysteria in the municipality of Canudos, in the interior of Bahia, through the works The epidemic madness of Canudos: Antônio Conselheiro and the jagunços, from 1897; and Epidemic of religious madness in Canudos; medical history of the alienated meneur, from 1901. According to the scholar, it was in a sociologically unstable environment, which can also be evaluated as a period marked by a social and religious crisis, that "Antônio Maciel dug the deep foundations of his almost indestructible material and spiritual power."

When analyzing the skull of leader Antônio Conselheiro, Nina states that he "is surely simply insane." Another point Rodrigues raises is that association and communication between already ill and predisposed individuals who are part of the same community are capable of sharing madness, and this is nothing more than "a reflection of, if not a period, at least of the environment" they are part of. Therefore, any immediate motive or cause could trigger an explosion of collective "hysteria." With the defeat of the community and the death of Antônio Conselheiro, Nina concluded that the leader's skull was a "normal skull," which contradicted everything he had studied in the Italian schools of forensics, influenced by Cesare Lombroso, Enrico Ferri, and Raffaele Garofalo, and the French schools of forensics, led by Alexandre Lacassagne and Paul Broca. In his studies, Nina argued that to understand what happened in Canudos, it was necessary to go beyond analyzing skin color and hair type, but rather the social influences that came to shape the behavior of the population of the small town in the interior of Bahia.

== Selected works ==
- Regime Alimentar no Norte do Brasil (1881)
- A Morféia em Andajatuba (1886)
- Das Amiotrofias de Origem Periférica (Doctorate thesis, 1888)
- As Raças Humanas e a Responsabilidade Penal no Brasil (1894)
- O Animismo Fetichista dos Negros Baianos (1900)
- O Alienado no Direito Civil Brasileiro (1901)
- Manual de Autópsia Médico-Legal (1901)
- Os Africanos no Brasil (1932)
- SILVA, Leonardo Dantas; RODRIGUES, Nina. Estudos sobre a escravidão negra. Recife: Fundação Joaquim Nabuco, Editora Massangana, 1988. 2 v. (Serie Abolição; 15, 17). ISBN 978-85-7019-161-8 (v. 1).
- RODRIGUES, MARIA REGINA NINA; MARANHÃO. Maranhão: do europeismo ao nacionalismo: politica e educação. São Luis: Plano Editorial, SECMA, 1993. 224p. ISBN 978-85-7207-064-5
- As Coletividades Anormais (1939)

== See also ==
- Louis Agassiz (1807–1873)
- Philippe Pinel (1745–1826)
- Jean-Étienne Dominique Esquirol (1772–1840)
- Bénédict Morel (1809–1873)
- Adolfo Bezerra de Menezes Cavalcanti (1831–1900)
- Cesare Lombroso (1835–1909)
- Valentin Magnan (1835–1916)
- Henry Maudsley (1835–1918)
- Eugenio Tanzi (1856–1934)
- Arthur Ramos (1903–1949)
- History of psychiatry
