= Colônia, Rio de Janeiro =

Region of Rio de Janeiro, Brazil

Coordinates: 22°56′24″S 43°24′07″W

Colônia is a region of Rio de Janeiro, but not officially recognized as a neighborhood.

It grew up around a psychiatric hospital named after Juliano Moreira.
