= Xenopholis undulatus =

Conservation status
- Least Concern (IUCN 3.1)

Scientific classification
- Kingdom: Animalia
- Phylum: Chordata
- Class: Reptilia
- Order: Squamata
- Suborder: Serpentes
- Family: Colubridae
- Genus: Xenopholis
- Species: X. undulatus

Binomial name
- Xenopholis undulatus (Jensen, 1900)

Synonyms
- Oxyrhopus undulatus Jensen, 1900; Paroxyrhopus undulatus — J. Peters & Orejas-Miranda, 1970; Xenopholis undulatus — da Cunha et al., 1985

Species of snake

Xenopholis undulatus, Jensen's ground snake, is a species of snake in the family Colubridae.

== Geographic range ==
Xenopholis undulatus is found in Brazil and Paraguay.
