= Xenopholis werdingorum =

Conservation status
- Least Concern (IUCN 3.1)

Scientific classification
- Kingdom: Animalia
- Phylum: Chordata
- Class: Reptilia
- Order: Squamata
- Suborder: Serpentes
- Family: Colubridae
- Genus: Xenopholis
- Species: X. werdingorum

Binomial name
- Xenopholis werdingorum Jansen, L. Álvarez & G. Köhler, 2009

Species of snake

Xenopholis werdingorum is a species of snake in the subfamily Dipsadinae of the family Colubridae. The species is endemic to South America.

== Etymology ==
The specific name, werdingorum (genitive, plural), is in honor of the Werding family of Bolivia, on whose hacienda the holotype was collected.

== Taxonomy ==
X. werdingorum is the most recently described (2009) of the three species in the genus Xenopholis.

== Geographic range ==
X. werdingorum is found in Bolivia (Santa Cruz Department) and adjacent Brazil.

== Description ==
Dorsally X. werdingorum is uniformly dark brown with an iridescent sheen. Ventrally, it is yellowish orange. The color transition on the flanks is gradual. Adults have a snout-to-vent length (SVL) of about 40 cm (16 in), with a tail about 5 cm (2.0 in) long.

== Reproduction ==
The mode of reproduction of X. werdingorum is unknown.
