= John Ligertwood Paterson =

Scottish physician who worked in Brazil

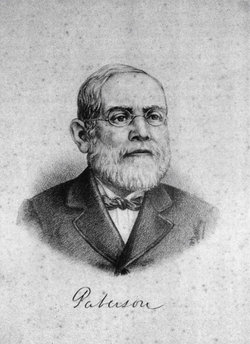
John Ligertwood Paterson

John Ligertwood Paterson (September 14, 1820 – December 9, 1882) was a Scottish medical doctor who lived and worked in Bahia, Brazil. He co-founded the Tropicalista School of Medicine in Brazil, along with O. E. H. Wucherer and José Francisco da Silva Lima.

== Early life and education ==
John Ligertwood Paterson was born on September 14, 1820, in Midmar, Aberdeenshire, Scotland.

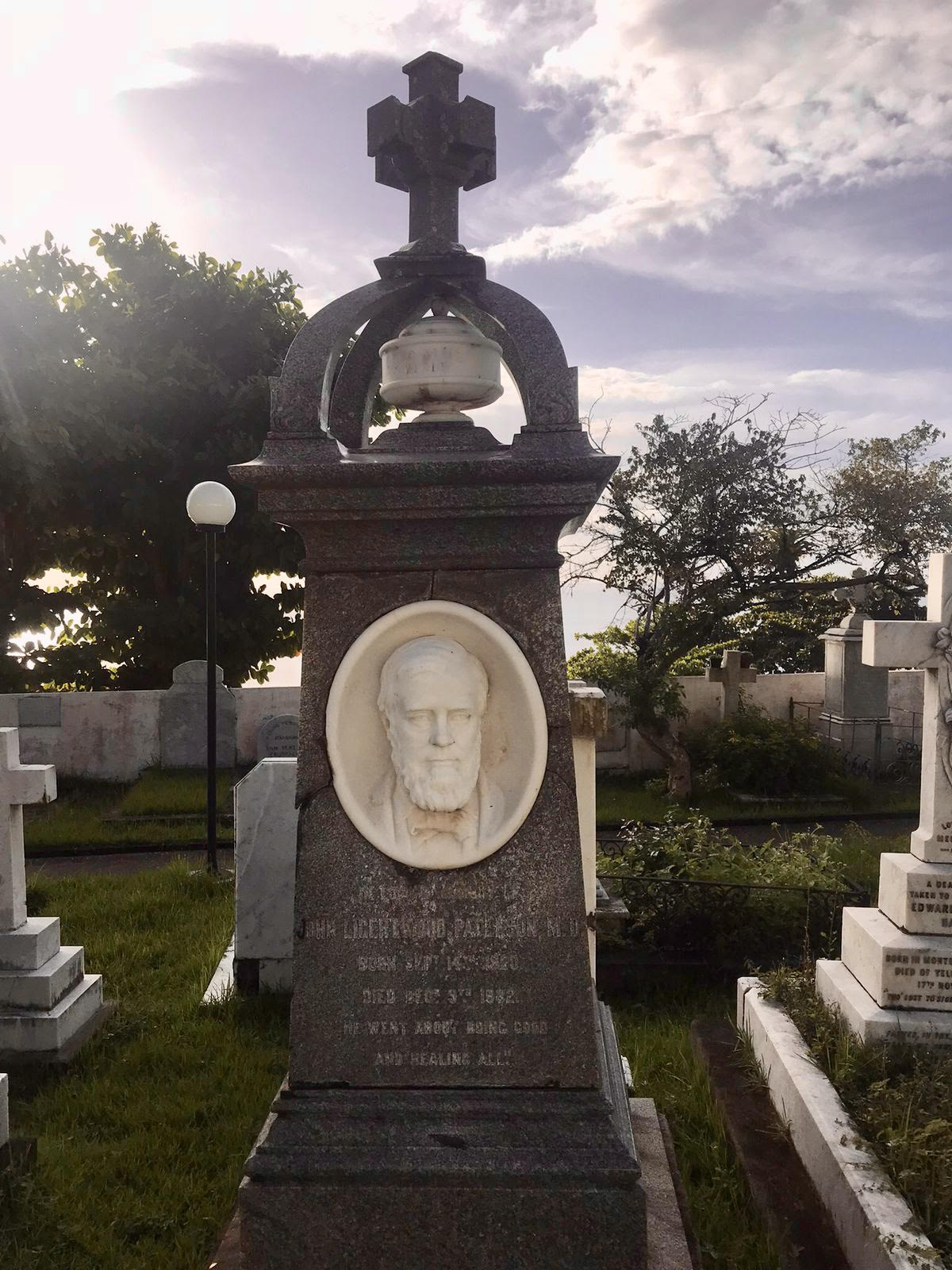
Tomb of John Ligertwood Paterson in the British Cemetery

His father, James Paterson, was a minister of the Secession church of Midmar. His elder brother, Alexander Ligertwood Paterson, was also a physician. After obtaining his medical degree from the Royal College of Surgeons in Edinburgh in 1841, John Ligertwood Paterson studied at the medical schools of Vienna and Paris.

== Career ==
When his brother, Alexander, obtained a position for him in Brazil, Paterson arrived in the province of Bahia in 1842, where he qualified as a physician by passing exams at the Bahia School of Medicine in November of that year.

Paterson co-founded the Tropicalista School of Medicine in Brazil, along with O. E. H. Wucherer (1820-1873) and José Francisco da Silva Lima (1826-1910). Together, they pioneered the study of tropical medicine in the Faculty of Medicine of Bahia and helped combat yellow fever and cholera. Paterson lived in Bahia for a quarter of a century.

He was elected a fellow of the Botanical Society of Edinburgh on July 11, 1872. Deeply interested in botanical science, he donated about forty tropical plants to the Society's garden, including Musa coccinea (the "flowering banana").

He was a friend of Emperor Pedro II of Brazil, who awarded him with the title of Knight of the Order of the Rose (1859), later adding the honorifics of Official (1870) and Commander (1872) of the same order.

Paterson was particularly revered in Bahia because he cared for the poor and enslaved as well as the Bahian elite. He died suddenly in Salvador, the provincial capital, having returned there from Edinburgh to look after his brother Alexander, who was suffering from paralysis. He was buried in the British Cemetery of Bahia.

== Personal life ==
In 1857, John Ligertwood Paterson married Caroline Mary Lefebvre, who was born in Rio de Janeiro and was the daughter of Mansell Lefebvre, a member of an old French family. They had five sons and one daughter. Two of their children were born in Bahia. Their eldest son, Alexander Gordon Paterson, graduated in Medicine from the University of Edinburgh.

== Legacy ==
In 1887, a monument with a bust of Paterson was erected in what is now the Graça district, bearing the following inscription in English and Portuguese: "As a testimony of friendship, esteem, and gratitude, this monument was erected by the public to the memory of John Ligertwood Paterson, on this site which was granted by the municipal council of the City of Bahia, President Dr. Augusto Ferreira França, and President of the Province Counsellor Pedro Luiz Pereira de Souza."
