= Hypostomus wuchereri =

Conservation status
- Data Deficient (IUCN 3.1)

Scientific classification
- Kingdom: Animalia
- Phylum: Chordata
- Class: Actinopterygii
- Order: Siluriformes
- Family: Loricariidae
- Genus: Hypostomus
- Species: H. wuchereri

Binomial name
- Hypostomus wuchereri (Günther, 1864)

Synonyms
- Plecostomus wuchereri

Species of catfish

Hypostomus wuchereri is a species of catfish in the family Loricariidae. It is native to South America, where it occurs in the Paraguaçu River basin in Brazil. The species reaches 35 cm (13.8 inches) in total length and is believed to be a facultative air-breather.

== Etymology ==
The fish is named in honor of Brazilian physician Otto Edward Henry Wucherer (1820–1873), whose personal collection supplied holotypes of this species and several other species from Bahia, Brazil.
