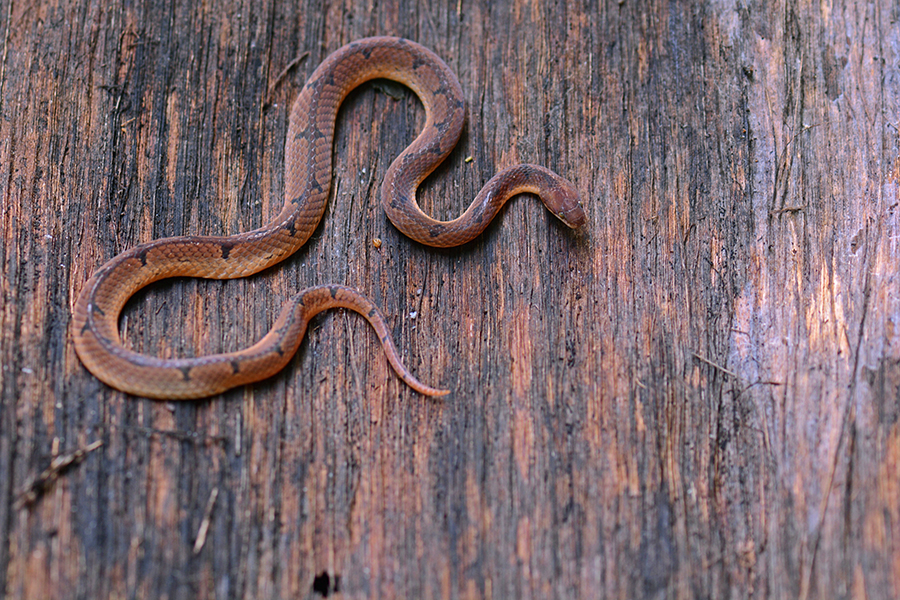

Conservation status
- Least Concern (IUCN 3.1)

Scientific classification
- Kingdom: Animalia
- Phylum: Chordata
- Class: Reptilia
- Order: Squamata
- Suborder: Serpentes
- Family: Colubridae
- Genus: Xenopholis
- Species: X. scalaris

Binomial name
- Xenopholis scalaris (Wucherer, 1861)

Synonyms
- Elapomorphus scalaris Wucherer, 1861; Xenopholis scalaris — Boulenger, 1896

= Xenopholis scalaris =

Species of snake

Xenopholis scalaris, also known as Wucherer's ground snake, is a species of snake in the family Colubridae. The species is endemic to South America.

== Geographic range ==
Xenopholis scalaris is found in Amazonian Bolivia, Brazil, Ecuador, and Peru. Other locality records include Colombia, French Guiana, and Venezuela.
