= Mariza Corrêa =

Brazilian anthropologist

Mariza Corrêa (1 December 1945 – 27 December 2016) was a Brazilian anthropologist and sociologist. She was professor at the Department of Anthropology of the State University of Campinas (Unicamp). She was also Unicamp’s Director of the Institute of Philosophy and Human Sciences from 1989 to 1993.

Trained in journalism in the Federal University of Rio Grande do Sul (1969), she started to study social sciences in the State University of Campinas where she graduated in 1975. She earned in 1982 her PhD in Political Sciences at the University of São Paulo with a thesis on Raimundo Nina Rodrigues.

Starting in 1984, Corrêa was participated in the “History of Anthropology in Brazil” project (PHAB). The goal was to document the history of Brazilian anthropology from the 1930s to the 1960s. Through the PHAB project, she noticed the lack of information about the contribute of women to anthropology in Brazil and, in 1989, started the “Women Anthropologists & Anthropology” project.

Between 1996 and 1998, she was president of the Associação Brasileira de Antropologia.

== Bibliography ==
=== In English ===
- “Our mulattos are more exuberant.” História, Ciências, Saúde-Manguinhos, 2008.
- An interview with Roberto Cardoso de Oliveira. Current Anthropology, 1991.
- Commemoration of the 50th anniversary of the first Brazilian anthropology meeting (1953–2003). Cadernos Pagu, 2023.
- Freud’s nanny and other nannies. Cadernos Pagu, 2008.
- Girl-Friday*. Cadernos Pagu, 2023.
- History of anthropology in Brazil (1930–1960) : Testimonies. BEROSE, 2024.
- My encounters with Ruth Landes. Cadernos Pagu, 2023.
- Women Anthropologists & Anthropology Research Project. BEROSE, 2024.
