= Arthur Ramos =

Brazilian psychiatrist

Arthur Ramos de Araujo Pereira (July 7, 1903 - October 31, 1949) was a psychiatrist, professor, and psychologist who played a major role in introducing and promoting psychoanalysis in Brazil. Ramos challenged the White supremacist and eugenic ideologies that Brazilian psychiatrists were adopting in the first half of the 20th century and instead suggested the use of Freudian psychoanalysis to bridge the tensions between Whiteness and Blackness in Brazil.

== Early life ==
Ramos was born on July 7, 1903, in Alagoas, Brazil. In 1921, Ramos enrolled at the Faculty of Medicine of Bahia, in which he specialized in clinical psychiatry and forensic psychology. In 1926, Ramos completed his thesis, Primitivo e Loucura (Primitive and Madness), where he adapted Lévy-Bruhl's theory of dual mindsets, the idea of having a "primitive" mindset vs. a "Western" mindset, for Black Brazilians. Ramos argued that the negative traits applied to Black Brazilians were not a result of genetics, and he suggested that their situations could be changed.

== Career ==
After completing his studies at the Faculdade de Medicine, Ramos worked as a psychiatric assistant at the São João de Deus Hospital in Bahia. Here, Ramos was able to apply the psychoanalytic approaches he had learned during his studies through psychopathological experiments.

In 1933, Ramos moved to Rio de Janeiro, where he served as the Chief of the Mental Hygiene Service in the Institute of Educational Research for the Rio school system until 1938. In this position, he conducted psychoanalytically based observations of public school children, identifying that what they had labeled as degeneracy was a learned process that could be improved through improvements in health, culture, and education.

In 1939, Ramos started to take a more scholarly approach to his work, focusing on racial justice activism and collaborating with scholar Melville Herskovits. Through this collaboration, he had the opportunity to visit and stay in the United States of America, where he toured the country speaking about race in Brazil and racial equality.

Ramos also served as the founder and first President of the Brazilian Anthropological and Ethnological Society. During his last three months, he served as the head of the United Nations Educational, Scientific and Cultural Organization (UNESCO)'s Department of Social Sciences.

== Research ==
During his time at Faculade de Medicina, Ramos was influenced by psychiatrist Nina Rodrigues. Rodrigues argued that Black and mixed-race people were prone to mental illness, criminality, and violence not because of their heritability but instead by genetic atavism. At the time, the majority of the medical schools in Bahia adopted the ideas of Rodrigues, specifically that Black and mixed-race people were predisposed to crime and insanity. Ramos and fellow colleagues, influenced by the ideas of Sigmund Freud, contradicted these ideas arguing that this perceived criminality and primitivity were a result of acquired maladjustments, not inherited traits, that were pushed upon Indigenous and Black populations as a product of poverty and structural and racial inequalities. Ramos research focused on the identifying the diagnostic traits of mental illness and connecting them to crime, separating crime from the inherited traits.

== Published work ==
While his beginning works focused on the application of psychoanalysis (O Negro Brasileiro, O Folclore Negro do Brasi), his later works shifted to a more anthropological view, focusing on social and human phenomena. Many of his works have been translated to English, Spanish, French, and German.

=== Books ===
- O Negro Brasileiro (1934)
- O Folclore Negro do Brasi (1935)
- As Culturas Negras no Novo Mundo (1937)
- Introduçao a Antropologia Brasileira, Volume 1 (1943)
- Les Poblaciones del Brasil (1944)
- Introduçao a Antropologia Brasileira, Volume 2 (1947)
