= Ferdinand Gottlieb von Gmelin =

German physician

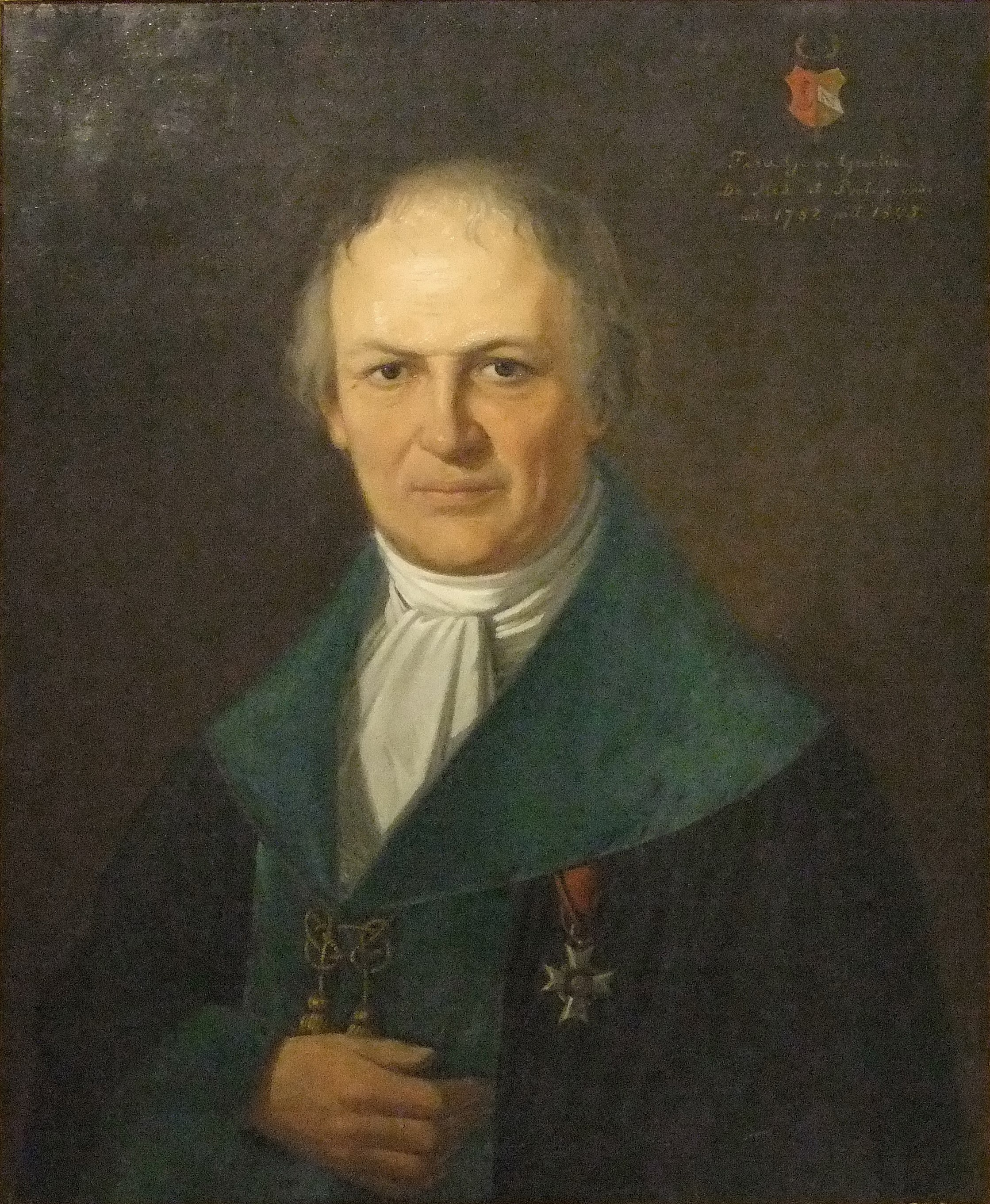
Portrait of Ferdinand Gottlieb von Gmelin by Heinrich Leibnitz (1845)

Ferdinand Gottlieb von Gmelin (10 March 1782 in Tübingen – 21 December 1848 in Tübingen) was a German medical doctor. He was a nephew of botanist Samuel Gottlieb Gmelin (1744–1784).

In 1802 he received his medical doctorate from the University of Tübingen, then following graduation, took a study trip through Germany, Italy and France. In 1805 he became an associate professor, and from 1810 onward, was a full professor of natural sciences and medicine at Tübingen. In 1823 he was awarded the Knight's Cross of the Order of the Württemberg Crown.

== Selected works ==
- Allgemeine Pathologie des menschlichen Körpers, 1813 – General pathology of the human body.
- Allgemeine Therapie der Krankheiten des Menschen, 1830 – General therapy of human diseases.
- Die ostindische Cholera (translation of John Mason Good; 1831) – East Indian cholera.
- Critik der Principien der Homöopathie, 1835 – Critique of the principles of homeopathy (considered to be his best work).
