= Henriqueta Martins Catharino =

Henriqueta Martins Catharino (Feira de Santana, Bahia 12 December 1886 — Salvador, Bahia 21 June 1969) was a Brazilian educator, philanthropist, and feminist pioneer responsible for the creation of one of the richest archives for fashion, popular culture, and popular history in Bahia.

== Early life ==
Henriqueta Catharino was one of fourteen children of the wealthy industrialist Bernardo Catharino and Dona Úrsula Costa Martins Catharino. In the first half of the 20th century, her father became the biggest businessman in the state of Bahia through his ownership of the Cia. União Fabril da Bahia.

This great wealth allowed Henriqueta access to much higher quality education than most girls of the era. Her education was directed by professor Cândia Campos de Carvalho, and included lessons in German, English, French language; piano; and fine arts. Henriqueta's mother was deeply religious, and instilled a strong Catholic faith in her children. The family made several trips to Europe as well, exposing the children to Parisian culture.

After the death of her fiancée Ernest Richard Hünerwadel in 1919, Henriqueta decided to remain unmarried and devote herself to improving the lives of young women.

== Activism ==
Henriqueta established a lending library to share her family's personal collection of books with young women in her "Good Reading Campaign" (Portuguese, Propaganda da Boa Leitura), and organized sewing workshops where participants made clothes for the poor.

In 1923, Henriqueta worked with Monsignor Flaviano Osório Pimentel (1876–1933) to co-found the Casa São Vicente, in a rented building in the Terreiro de Jesus neighborhood to support and protect working women. The Casa São Vicente included a library, lecture rooms, training centers and an employment agency, as well as lodgings and a restaurant for women. After the death of her mother in 1924, Henriqueta transferred the Casa São Vicente to a building she inherited.

By 1929, the success of Casa São Vicente led the Bahian government to officially recognize the program as the "Women's Institute of Bahia" (Portuguese, Instituto Feminino da Bahia or IFB). In addition to courses preparing young women for the job market, the Women's Institute of Bahia also became a repository for the collection that would one day facilitate the creation of the Henriqueta Martins Catharino Museum (Portuguese, Museu Henriqueta Martins Catharino). These collections focused on three areas: textiles and clothing; popular art; and decorative art.

In 1950, the foundation was renamed the Women's Institute Foundation of Bahia (Portuguese, Fundação Instituto Feminino da Bahia).
