= Faculty of Medicine, Federal University of Bahia =

Faculty of Medicine of Bahia of the Federal University of Bahia

Faculty of Medicine
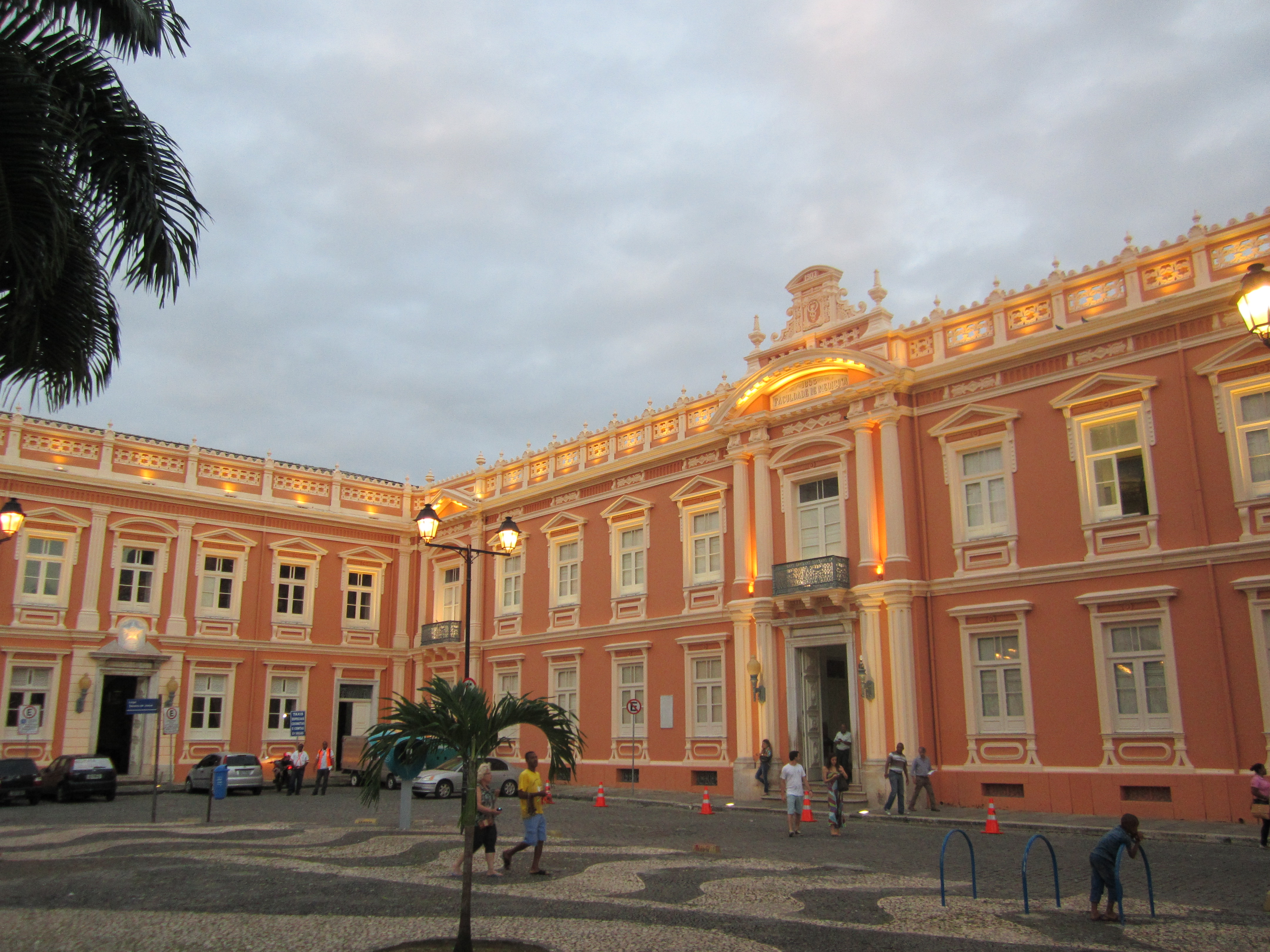
- c. 2013
- Motto: Sannare Atque Servare
- Motto in English: To heal and to protect
- Type: Public research
- Established: February 18, 1808
- Parent institution: Federal University of Bahia
- Location: Largo do Terreiro de Jesus, Pelourinho, Salvador, Brazil
- Website: https://fmb.ufba.br/

The Faculty of Medicine of Bahia of the Federal University of Bahia (Portuguese: Faculdade de Medicina da Bahia da Universidade Federal da Bahia, FMB-UFBA) is a unit of the Federal University of Bahia.

Founded in February 1808 by the physician Correia Picanço, Baron of Goiana, and established by royal decree of Prince Regent John VI, the Faculty was the first medical school in Brazil and one the earliest higher education that have remained active in the country. (Note: IME and the Polytechnic School of the Federal University of Rio de Janeiro trace their origins to an earlier institution, the Royal Academy of Artillery, Fortification and Drawing, which was later reformed into the Royal Military Academy, the predecessor of several institutions, including the Military Academy of Agulhas Negras. Due to the direct institutional continuity between the 1808 surgery school and the modern Faculty, FMB-UFBA is sometimes referred to as the earliest higher-education institution still active in Brazil.) Its historic building is located at the Terreiro de Jesus Square, in the Historic Center of Salvador, while the main campus, where classes are held, is located on the Canela campus, alongside the faculties of law, music, and education.

As of 2025, it was ranked among the top medical schools in Brazil. In 2023, the Faculty received the National Order of Scientific Merit.

== History ==
=== Background ===
Unlike the Spanish Empire, which had been founding universities across its colonies since the 16th century, the Portuguese Empire was comparatively slower to develop higher education in its overseas possessions. The Royal Academy of Artillery, Fortification and Drawing, which is considered to be Brazil's first formal institution of higher learning, was established only in 1792 in Rio de Janeiro.

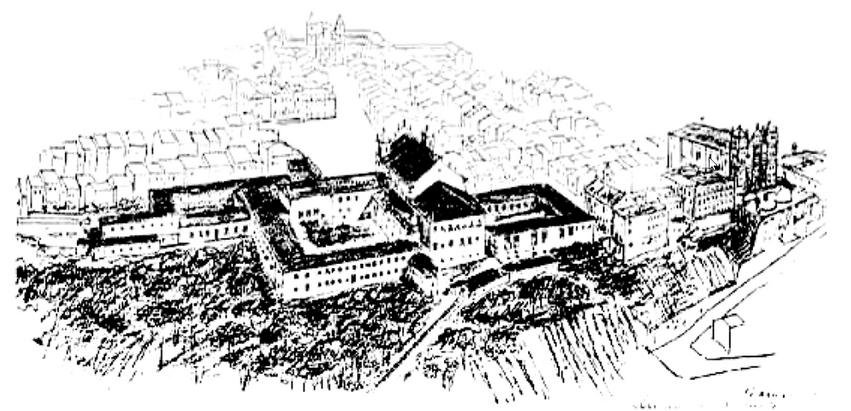
Illustrative reconstruction of the Jesuit College of Salvador in the 17th century

As a result, professional physicians were scarce in colonial Brazil, and health services were largely offered by apothecaries, barber-surgeons, folk healers, and members of the Society of Jesus. The Jesuits established boticas (pharmacies), where they prepared remedies and educated disciples in surgery. Indigenous practices were widely adopted by both the Jesuits and the general population. Physicians with formal training—most of them graduates from the University of Coimbra—were present in major urban centers, but were few in number and tended to limit their services to the upper classes.

From the mid-to-late 17th-century, there were repeated attempts by the Jesuits to raise the Jesuit College of Salvador, the largest and most important in the colony, to the status of a university. Despite never succeeding in this objective, the College functioned similarly to a university, sometimes being compared to the University of Évora. There, Jesuits maintained infirmaries, where medical and surgical practices were taught.

=== Establishment and Kingdom of Brazil ===
With the transfer of the Portuguese court to Brazil, John VI turned his attention to internal issues in Brazil, including its shortage of surgeons. On February 18, 1808, he chartered the School of Surgery of Bahia (Escola de Cirurgia da Bahia) at the request of Baron Correia Picanço, Surgeon-Major of the Kingdom and surgeon to the Royal Family, who, months later, founded the Faculty of Medicine of Rio de Janeiro. Initially housed in a military hospital occupying the old Jesuit College, the school only offered a four-year course in surgery, which required proficiency in French. It is presumed that its graduates were expected to replace surgeons who had been licensed by the old Junta do Protomedicato, a royal body tasked with regularizing medical professions, which was abolished in January 1809.

In December 1815, with the elevation of Brazil to a Kingdom, John VI issued a royal decree reforming the Institution, which was renamed the Medical-Surgical Academy of Bahia (Academia Médico-Cirúrgica da Bahia). Until then, the school's staff consisted of two professors and one porter, and its curriculum was limited to human anatomy and rudimentary elements of physiology and pathology. The following year, an academic plan formulated by Manoel Luiz Alvares de Carvalho restructured the course, expanding the academic body, extending the program to five years, and introducing new chairs, including public hygiene, pharmaceutical chemistry, etiology, therapeutics, and obstetrics. The Academia was also relocated to a more spacious and suitable facility, the Santa Casa da Misericórdia da Bahia, where the largest hospital in Bahia was hosted.

The conditions under which the Faculty operated were described as precarious. Classes were held in poorly illuminated rooms distributed across the infirmary hall of the Santa Casa. Each discipline had its own compendium, which was used as the basis for classes. As a result of these difficulties, several of the Academia's students complemented their education in Europe, especially in Portugal and France, and student dropout was frequent. Between 1808 and 1832, the Academia licensed very few students, with estimates, such as a 1909 Historical Account, placing the total at thirteen.

=== Empire ===
In 1830, the politician and professor Francisco de Paula de Araújo e Almeida presented a proposal for academic reform to the Chamber of Deputies, which was forwarded to the Medical Society of Rio de Janeiro. The resulting plan, modeled after the Faculty of Medicine of the University of Paris, formally recognized the institution as the Faculdade de Medicina da Bahia, extended its medical program to six years, expanded its curriculum to include disciplines such as the history of medicine, botany, zoology, and mineralogy, and introduced a new three-year long program in pharmaceutics, along with a separate two-year course in obstetrics.

Like its twin institution, the Faculty of Medicine of Rio de Janeiro, the Faculty instituted an admission examination that included arithmetics, geometry, French or English, moral and rational philosophy, and Latin. Applicants were required to be at least sixteen years old, attest to familial land ownership, and pay an admission fee of around 20$000Rs, a significant sum for the period.

Throughout the 1830s, the Faculty oversaw infrastructural improvements, such as the establishment of its library and a chemistry laboratory. The latter was constructed with supplies procured in Europe by Manuel Rodrigues da Silva. Another advancement was the creation of a cabinet of anatomy by Jonathas Abbott, an English-born physician who would later assume the chair of general anatomy and become director of the Faculty. Documents, such as the institution's historical record (memória histórica), reveal the strong French influence on the Faculty's intellectual environment, with Antoine Destutt de Tracy's idéologie and its representatives providing the principal theoretical framework.

In April 1854, during the ministry of Luís Pedreira do Couto Ferraz, Viscount of Bom Retiro, Emperor Pedro II approved a law reforming both the Faculties of Bahia and Rio de Janeiro, a measure that became known as the ''Couto Ferraz'' or ''Bom Retiro'' reform. Following the French university model, it introduced new chairs, including organic chemistry, materia medica, general anatomy, and pathological anatomy, and proposed the creation of a botanical garden, a pharmaceutical laboratory, and cabinets of physics and natural history. These proposals were not implemented, which drew criticism from students and the staff.

By the mid-nineteenth century, the Faculty, then one of the four existing colleges in Brazil—along with the law faculties of São Paulo and Recife and the medical faculty of Rio de Janeiro—had already established itself as a center where the political and cultural elites of Salvador and the northeastern Brazil were educated. During the War of Paraguay, several of its professors and students were mobilized and volunteered to serve in field hospitals, treat wounded soldiers, or enlist in the Imperial Army.

In 1866, the academic journal Gazeta Médica da Bahia was founded, consolidating the Faculty as a center of scientific research. From the mid to late nineteenth century, led by a generation of researchers later known as Escola Tropicalista Bahiana, the institution pioneered fields such as hygienism, tropical medicine, and anthropological criminology. The Gazeta published developments such as the contributions of Otto Wucherer to the study of filariasis and hookworm disease, the classification and characterization of beriberi by José Francisco de Silva Lima, studies on surgery and tropical diseases by John Ligertwood Paterson, and investigations of social and psychiatric phenomena by Nina Rodrigues, who founded an eugenicist school of criminology. Another contribution was presented in Juliano Moreira's 1891 graduation thesis, Etiologia da Sífilis Maligna Precoce, in which he analyzed and described early malignant syphilis, challenging explanations inspired by scientific racism and climatic determinism.

In 1877, Alfredo Casimiro da Rocha, considered the first formally graduated Black physician in Brazil, completed his degree with the doctoral thesis Do diagnóstico e tratamento do beribéri, an early contribution to the then-incipient field of endocrinology in the country.

In the 1870s, a commission formed by Brazilian professors of medicine, which included Vicente Cândido Figueira de Saboia and Domingos José Freire Junior, was tasked with examining European models of medical education, in particular the German and the French. The resulting report paved the way for another academic reform, approved in 1879 under the Ministry of Leôncio de Carvalho. Among its changes were the division of disciplines into institutes, the establishment of odontology as a discipline and of an affiliated school of pharmacy, the flexibilization of attendance criteria, as well as the admission of women to the institution. In 1887, Rita Lobato became the first woman to receive a degree from a Brazilian medical faculty, presenting a graduation thesis on caesarean section.

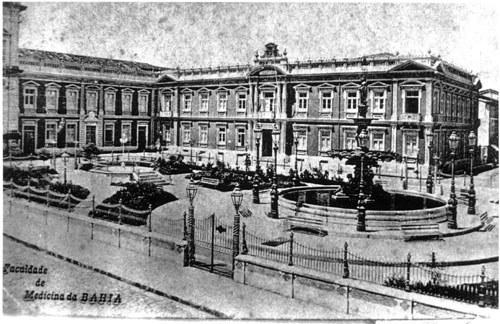
The reconstructed building of the Faculty photographed around 1910. Carried out by the engineer Teodoro Sampaio and designed by Victor Dubugras, it was erected on the remains of the former Colégio dos Jesuítas.

=== Republic ===
==== First Republic (1889 - 1930) ====
In 1891, another reform reorganizing the two existing medical schools in Brazil was enacted under the presidency of Deodoro da Fonseca: attendance was made mandatory, and the academic body was then extended to twenty-nine chairs, distributed across twelve sections and six series. The same year, a laboratory of dentistry was established, with Antonio Baptista dos Anjos appointed as its director.

During the late stages of the War of Canudos, the Faculty began organizing infirmaries and small hospitals to treat wounded loyalist soldiers. Its main facility was later converted into a temporary hospital, where fluoroscopy and radiography, techniques introduced to Brazil by Alfredo Thomé de Britto, were used to detect lodged bullets in patients. During the fourth and final expedition to Canudos, professors and dozens of students were sent to the war zone to provide medical support.

On the night of March 2, 1905, during Carnival, a fire broke out in the Faculty's warehouse and spread to other buildings and the library. A man soon noticed smoke coming from the library's windows and alerted people nearby. As later reported by the then director Alfredo Thomé de Britto, the fire consumed the library, several laboratories, and the old Jesuit chapel, while severely damaging classrooms, corridors, the Faculty's grand hall, and its archive, destroying the former structure. Whether the fire was caused by arson remains unknown.

Following the disaster, the remaining structure was demolished to allow for a new building, whose planning was supported by the president Rodrigues Alves and the Minister of Justice José Joaquim Seabra. The new edifice was designed by the French-born Brazilian architect Victor Dubugras in an eclectic style, with the predominance of neoclassical elements, and its construction was entrusted to the engineer Teodoro Sampaio. Many features of the historical building were preserved, including the rhythmic disposition of window and door openings, a rudimentary entablature continuing the façade of the Cathedral Basilica of Salvador, and curved roof tiles inspired by colonial Luso-Brazilian architecture.

In 1909, Maria Odília Teixeira graduated with a thesis titled Algumas considerações acerca da curabilidade e do tratamento das Cirrhoses Alcoólicas, becoming the first Black woman to obtain a medical degree in Brazil.

== Courses ==
=== Undergraduate ===
FMB-UFBA offers two undergraduate courses, Medicine and Occupational Therapy. The latter was established in 2021, with its first cohort formed in August of the same year.

Admission occurs mainly through ENEM, an annual examination that assesses competencies across four areas, namely Languages (including either English or Spanish), Mathematics, Natural Sciences, and Human Sciences, in addition to an argumentative essay. The selection process is rigorous, requiring elevated admission scores.
