= Gazeta Médica da Bahia =

Medical journal

- Discipline: Medicine
- Language: Brazilian Portuguese
- Edited by: José Tavares-Neto

Publication details
- History: 1866–present
- Publisher: Faculdade de Medicina da Bahia (part of Universidade Federal da Bahia) (Brazil)
- Frequency: Irregular
- Open access: Yes

Standard abbreviations
- ISO 4: Gaz. Méd. Bahia

Indexing
- ISSN: 0016-545X

Links
- Journal homepage; Online archive

The Gazeta Médica da Bahia (in English: Medical Gazette of Bahia), also known as GMBahia, is a medical scientific journal published by the Faculty of Medicine of Bahia, the oldest medical school in Brazil, currently a part of the Federal University of Bahia.

== History ==
The journal was created in 1866 and published regularly until 1934, when its publication was suspended. It was then resumed during the years of 1966–1972, and a single issue was published in 1976. In 1984, the journal's cumulative index was organized, and it was found that 3870 works had been published in it until then. Publication was resumed in 2004. In 2008, during the medical faculty's bicentenary, all previously published editions of the journal were made freely available on the internet.

The scientists publishing articles in the magazine around the turn of the 19th century became known in contemporary historiography as the Bahian Tropicalist School, which pioneered, together with other physicians of the time, a wave of experimental etiological studies focused on understanding tropical diseases common among the population of Brazil, rejecting the view common among proponents of Degeneration theory that such diseases would be caused by the local climate or by race mixing, as was proposed by some academics at the time.

Though this group played a key role in dismantling such beliefs, Flavio Coelho Edler points out in Escola Tropicalista Baiana (Bahia Tropical School): the mystical origin of tropical medicine in Brazil that, unlike many historical studies claim, the school was not isolated from other medical groups at the time, nor did it perform an abrupt, radical rupture from previous academic beliefs; rather it was part of a general wave of scientific and medical practices aimed at distancing national practices away from blind reproduction of European medical knowledge in favour of local experimentation.

== Contributors ==
Notable contributors include Wucherer, who published in it the first description of Hookworm infection and Filariasis, as well as classifying most local venomous snakes; Silva Lima's early studies on Beriberi and the early works on public health and legal medicine by Raimundo Nina Rodrigues.
