= Calundu =

Afro-Brazilian ritual

Calundu was an Afro-Brazilian spiritualism that incorporates ritual drumming and spirit incorporation. Calundu was mostly practiced by Slaves and free persons of African descent in the 17th and 18th century mining communities of Minas Gerais. The rituals were not exclusive to people of African descent, white people would seek healing through Calundu. Calundu's drumming is believed to have survived in different syncretic religions throughout Brazil such as Umbanda and Candomble, as well as influence their drum-incorporated musical stylings.
