= Juliano Moreira =

Brazilian psychiatrist (1872–1933)

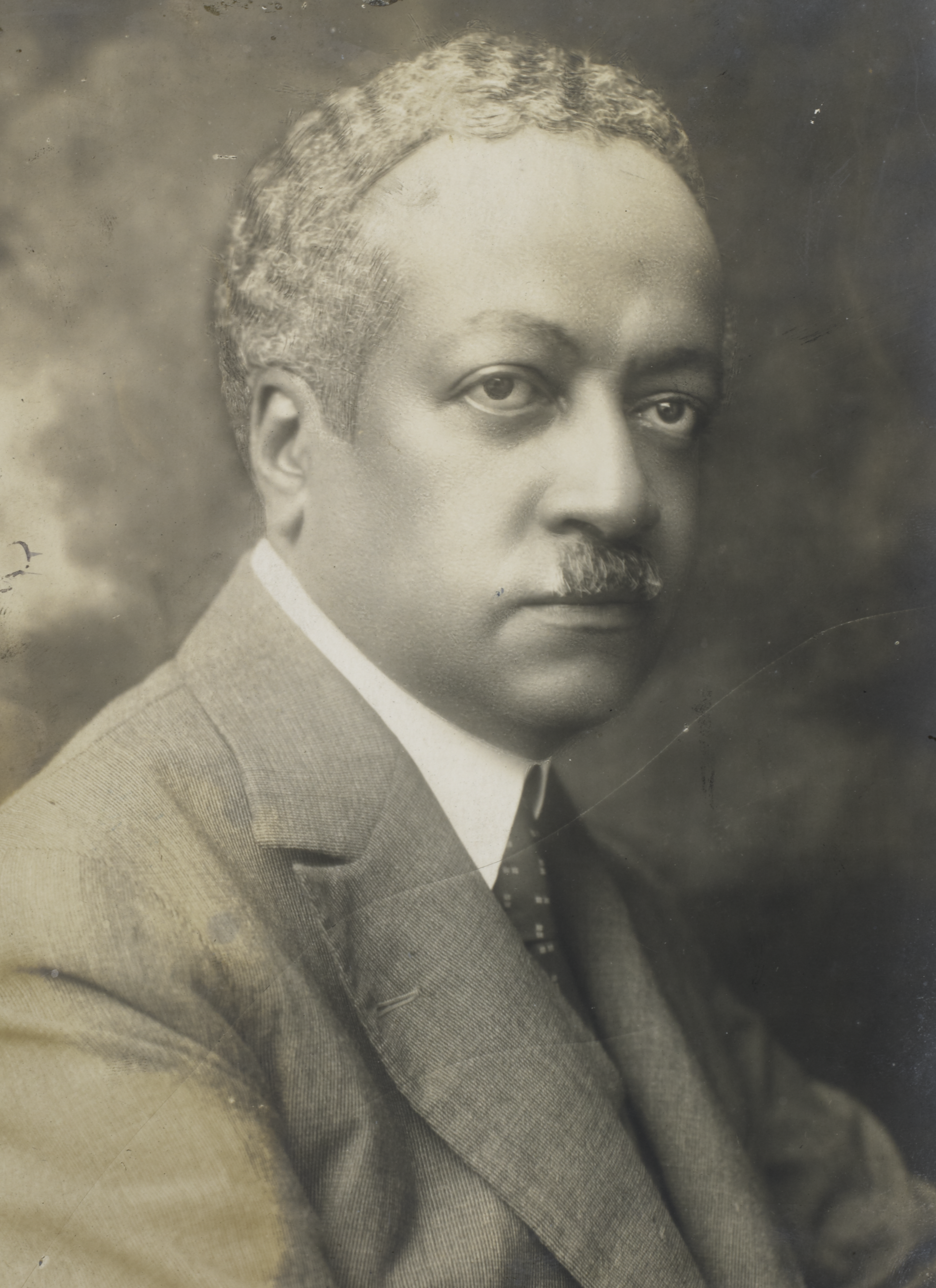
- Born: January 6, 1872; Salvador, Province of Bahia, Empire of Brazil
- Died: May 2, 1933 (aged 61); Petrópolis, Rio de Janeiro (state), Brazil
- Education: Faculty of Medicine, Federal University of Bahia
- Occupation: psychiatrist

Juliano Moreira (6 January 1872 – 2 May 1933) was a Brazilian psychiatrist, often considered the pioneer of psychoanalysis in Brazil. Moreira was the first Brazilian university professor to cite and use the psychoanalytic theory in teaching medicine.

== Life and career ==
Juliano Moreira was born on January 6, 1872, in Salvador, capital of the then province of Bahia. He studied at the Faculdade de Medicina da Bahia (Faculty of Medicine of Bahia), today the Federal University of Bahia (UFBA), graduating in 1891 with the thesis Sífilis maligna precoce (Early malignant syphilis). In 1896 he became a professor of psychiatry at his alma mater.

From 1895 to 1902, he attended mental illness courses and internships and visited many asylums in Germany, England, France, Italy, and Scotland. In addition to study trips, he was often required to seek out specialists and clinics to treat his tuberculosis.

When the disease got worse, he took a new license and traveled to Europe for better treatment. Later, he went to a sanatorium in Cairo, where he met Augusta Peick, a German nurse from Hamburg. The two married in the early 1910s and came together to Brazil.

From 1903 to 1930, Moreira was the director of the Hospício Nacional de Alienados (National Asylum for the Insane), currently Hospício Pedro II, in Rio de Janeiro. During his tenure, he humanized the patients' treatment and ended their imprisonment.

Moreira spoke against the pseudoscientific racist beliefs espoused at the time, such as that racial miscegenation caused mental illnesses; he defended that they were due to physical and situational factors such as poor hygiene and lack of access to education. Moreira was the first researcher to identify mucosal cutaneous leishmaniasis and sought to prove that the racial issue did not motivate the disease.

Despite opposing racism, Moreira was a member of eugenist organizations and defended practices such as the sterilization of criminals and alcoholics.

Moreira joined the Brazilian Academy of Sciences in 1917 and was its president from 1926 to 1929.

== Death ==
Moreira died in 1933 in Petrópolis, in a sanatory to treat his tuberculosis. Colônia Juliano Moreira, a psychiatric colony near Rio de Janeiro was named after him.

== Tribute ==
On January 6, 2021, Google celebrated his 149th birthday with a Google Doodle.
