= Monument to Brazilian Literature =

Bronze sculpture in Rio Grande do Sul, Brazil

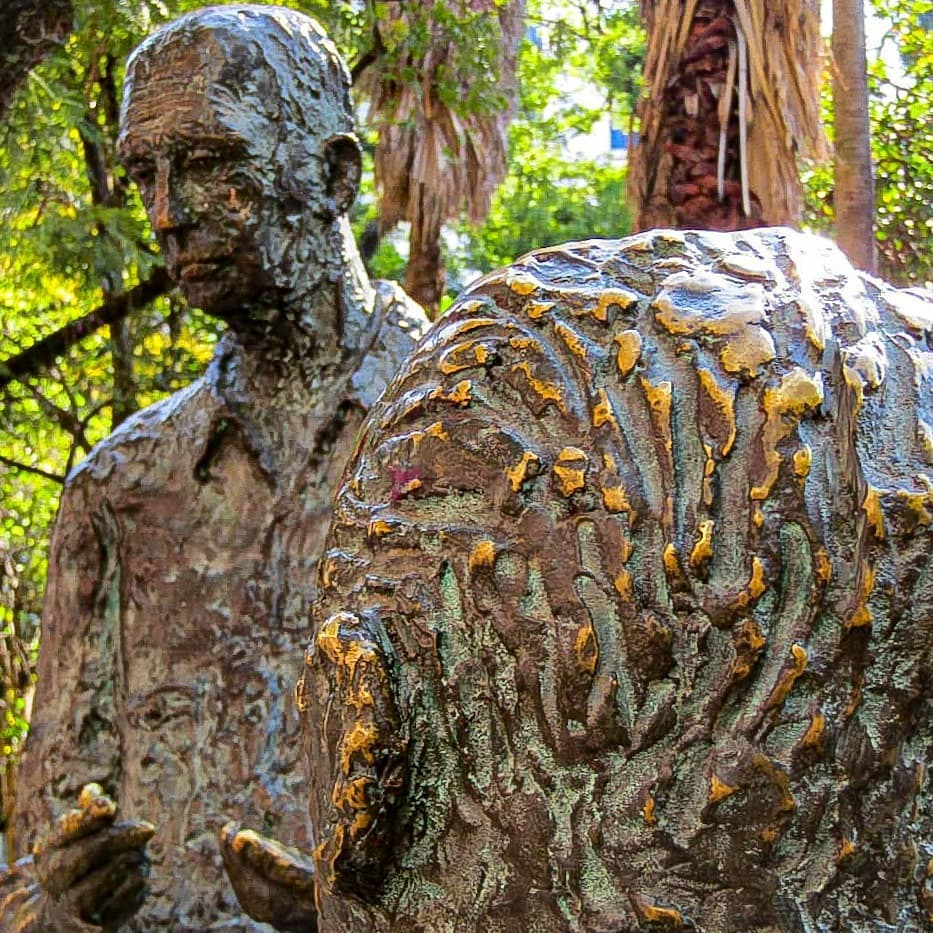
- Statue viewed from the side
- Interactive map of Monument to Brazilian Literature
- Location: Praça da Alfândega, Porto Alegre, Rio Grande do Sul
- Type: Statue
- Material: Metal alloy (Bronze)

The Monument to Brazilian Literature (also known as Monument to Carlos Drummond de Andrade and Mario Quintana) is a piece consisting of three bronze elements: a bench and two human figures, one standing (representing the poet Carlos Drummond de Andrade) and one seated (representing the poet Mário Quintana). It is located in the historic center of Porto Alegre, specifically in Praça da Alfândega, near major museums such as the Casa de Cultura Mario Quintana and the MARGS.

The work was created by sculptor Xico Stockinger in collaboration with Eloisa Tregnago. The pieces were initially modeled in clay at Stockinger's studio, then molds were made and finally cast in São Paulo. The work was commissioned by the Câmara Riograndense do Livro for the 47th Porto Alegre Book Fair, and was inaugurated on October 26, 2001, in the central area of Praça da Alfândega, where it remains.

The monument consists of life-sized statues of the writers Mario Quintana and Carlos Drummond de Andrade, who lived during the same era. The statues depict a casual meeting where the two poets are imagined discussing their works in Praça da Alfândega. The location of the monument is notable as it is a block away from the Casa de Cultura Mário Quintana, which suggests that the historical meeting of the writers could have been real.

On October 17, 2012, the statue of Carlos Drummond de Andrade was removed for structural repairs and was reinstated a week later on October 25.

The work has been vandalized several times, including the theft of a key part of the sculpture—a book held by Carlos Drummond—in 2015. Additionally, on July 20, 2022, the sculpture was vandalized with yellow paint. The paint was removed the following day.
