= Mário Quintana, Rio Grande do Sul =

Neighbourhood in Porto Alegre, Brazil

Coordinates: 30°02′00″S 51°06′17″W

Mário Quintana
- Neighbourhood (Bairro)
- Location in Brazil
- Country: Brazil
- State: Rio Grande do Sul
- City: Porto Alegre
- Established: December 22, 1998
- Named for: Mário Quintana

Mário Quintana is a neighbourhood (bairro) in the city of Porto Alegre, the state capital of Rio Grande do Sul, in Brazil. Created by Law 8258 from December 22, 1998, it was named in honour of poet Mário Quintana, who died in 1994.

The occupation of Mario Quintana dates from 1896, but there were few dwellers until the 1960s, when the City Hall started to transfer masses of poor people from shantytowns in Porto Alegre to this neighbourhood. In the 1980s, authorities begun to finance some infrastructure and housing projects. In 1991, the Chico Mendes Park was created.

Today, the economic inequality among the population in Mario Quintana is quite noticeable, with slums directly next to gated communities.
