= Museum of the Black History in Porto Alegre =

Open-air museum in Porto Alegre, Brazil

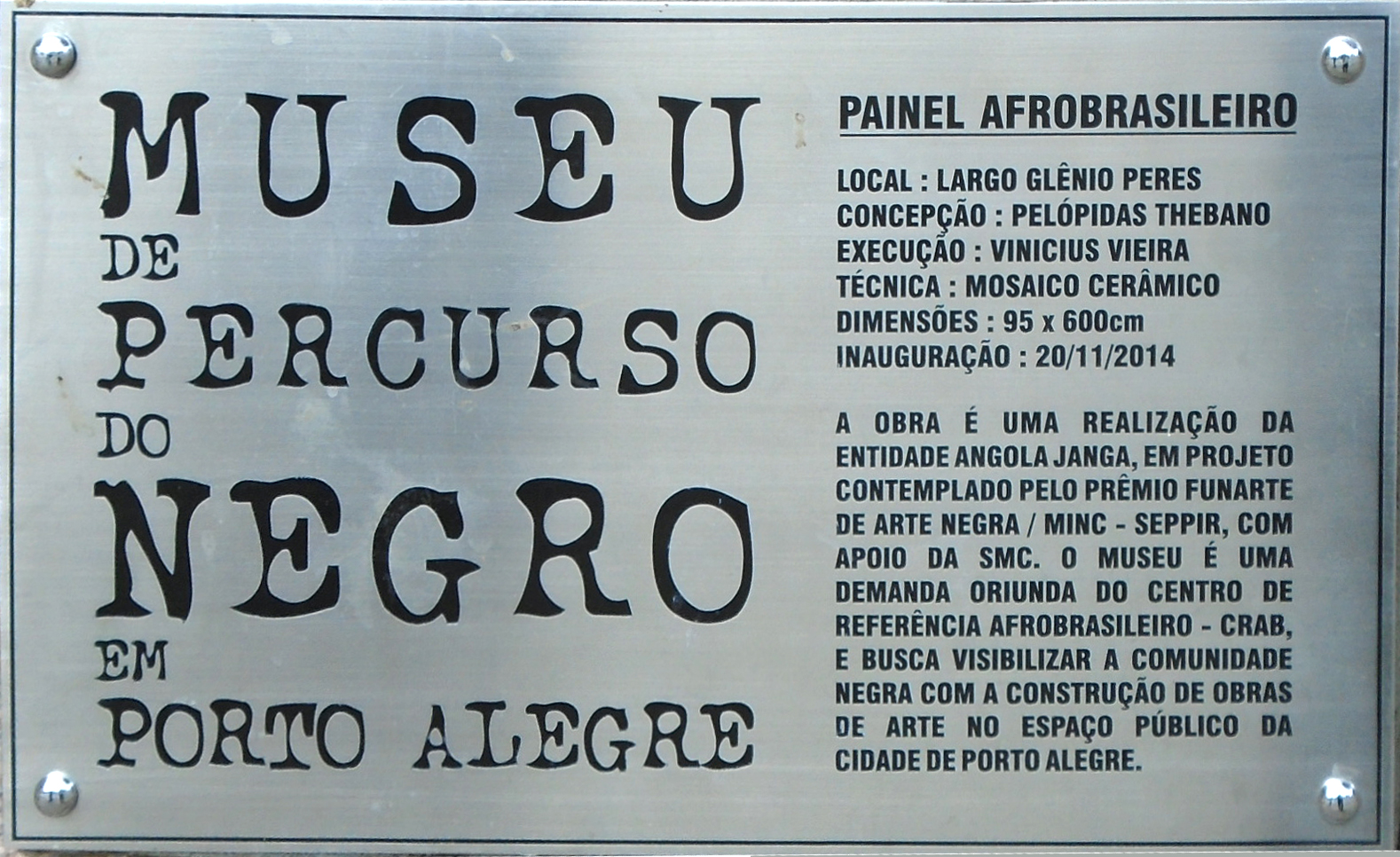
Sign of one of the works of the Black History Museum in Porto Alegre.

The Museum of the Black History in Porto Alegre, sometimes called the Black History Museum, is an open-air museum in the Brazilian city of Porto Alegre, dedicated to giving more visibility to the black community and rescuing the memory of its presence in the city.

The museum does not have a headquarters. As historian Pedro Vargas said, "it is a museum of path, of territory. And it seeks to mark important places for the memory of the black population, which have been erased over time. The museum brings back an almost lost memory of this black population that was also part of the beginning of Porto Alegre. Population that, today, is practically invisibilized." It is the first of its kind in Brazil.

== History ==
The antecedents of the creation of the Black History Museum are in the strengthening of the awareness of the black community and, more specifically, in the Civic Walks carried out in the beginning of the 21st century, idealized by artists, poets and writers connected to the Black Culture Association. The first one took place on May 20, 2001, commemorating the three black dates in the month of May: May 13, day of the abolition of slavery, transformed by the black movement into the National Day of Denunciation against Racism; May 14, date of the execution of the leaders of the Malê revolt of 1835, and May 25, Africa Day. According to Karitha Soares, "the proposal was to walk through the places where black Africans and their descendants built memories, whether through work, plight, cultural expressions, or resistance. The walk went through the Public Market, the Rosário Church, the area of the old jail, Praia Street, the site of the old Pelourinho in the square of the Dores Church, the old Forca Square and others, ending at the Mário Quintana Culture House, where a conversation circle took place.

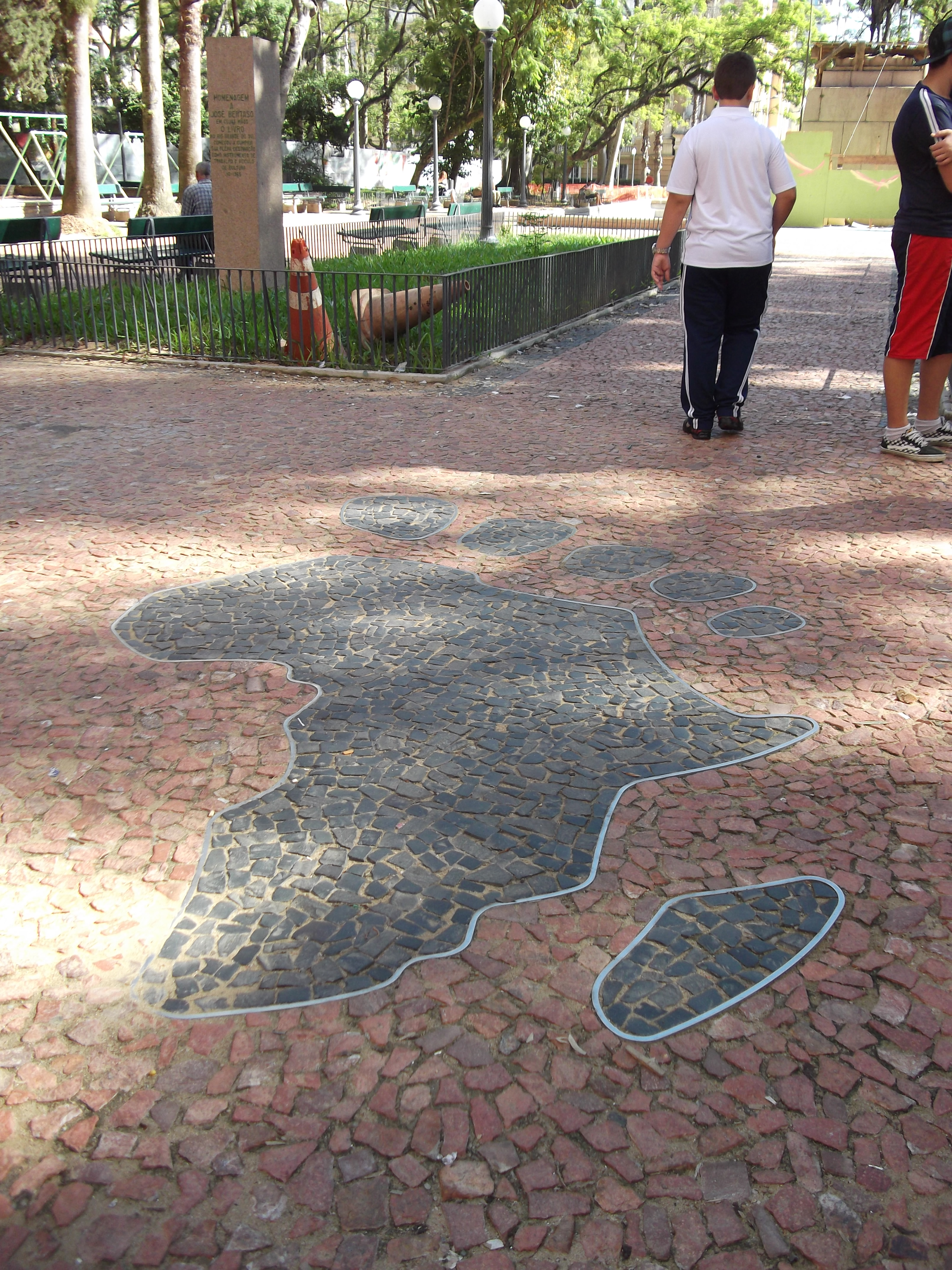
The "Pegada Africana" at Alfândega Square, one of the landmarks of the Black History Museum.

The museum was first conceived in 2003 by several black social movements, which met at the Museum of Porto Alegre to organize a seminar to create the Afro-Brazilian Reference Center, an entity that came to centralize the demands of the black movements in the capital. Among other things, they demanded greater representation in the cultural heritage of the city, based on the observation that the hundreds of statues, busts, and public monuments in the city did not include blacks, despite their fundamental contribution to the formation and growth of Porto Alegre, and that black memory was being increasingly erased. The idea of the museum thus emerged, as Pedro Vargas said, as a way to revisit and rewrite the city's history, and to claim "civil and political rights of representation of the black ethnic group in the concert of memories and peoples that originated and make Porto Alegre."

After a historical research to identify the places of reference, memory and belonging of black territories in Porto Alegre, led by Professor Iosvaldyr Bittencourt Júnior, in partnership with several griot masters such as Walter Calixto Ferreira, José Alves Bitencourt, Nilo Feijó and Elaine Rodrigues, a project was elaborated to enable its materialization, by a group of artists, historians, journalists, museologists and researchers, all militants of the black movement, where Arilson dos Santos Gomes, Jeanice Dias Ramos, Lorecinda Abraão, Vinícius Vieira, Pedro Rubens Vargas, Ivan Braz, Adriana Santos and Fernanda Carvalho stand out. There was much resistance to overcome in the municipal bureaucracy before the project was accepted.

Approved by the Participatory Budget, the first stage of its implementation was completed in 2011 with the participation of the Afro-Brazilian Reference Center, the coordination of the Angola Janga Working Group and support from the City Hall and the Monumenta Program. The IPHAN guided its execution. In the meantime, the Carris Company organized a bus tour through the city's black territories, passing through most of the places defined in the museum, which due to the great demand by schools and educational projects was extended far beyond the forecast. Meanwhile, courses were given to train monitors to accompany visitors on the museum's route.

== Route ==
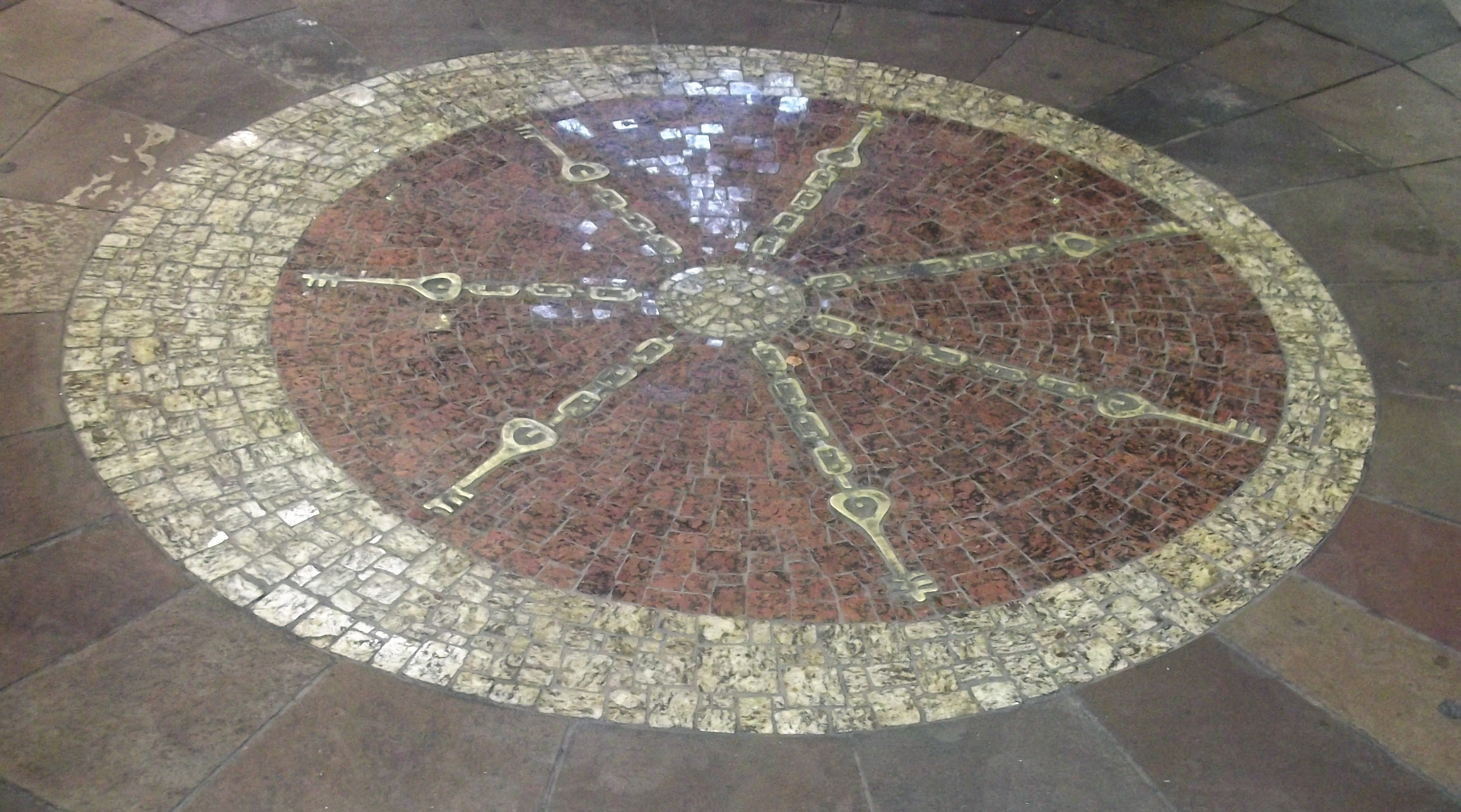
The Bará landmark in the Public Market.

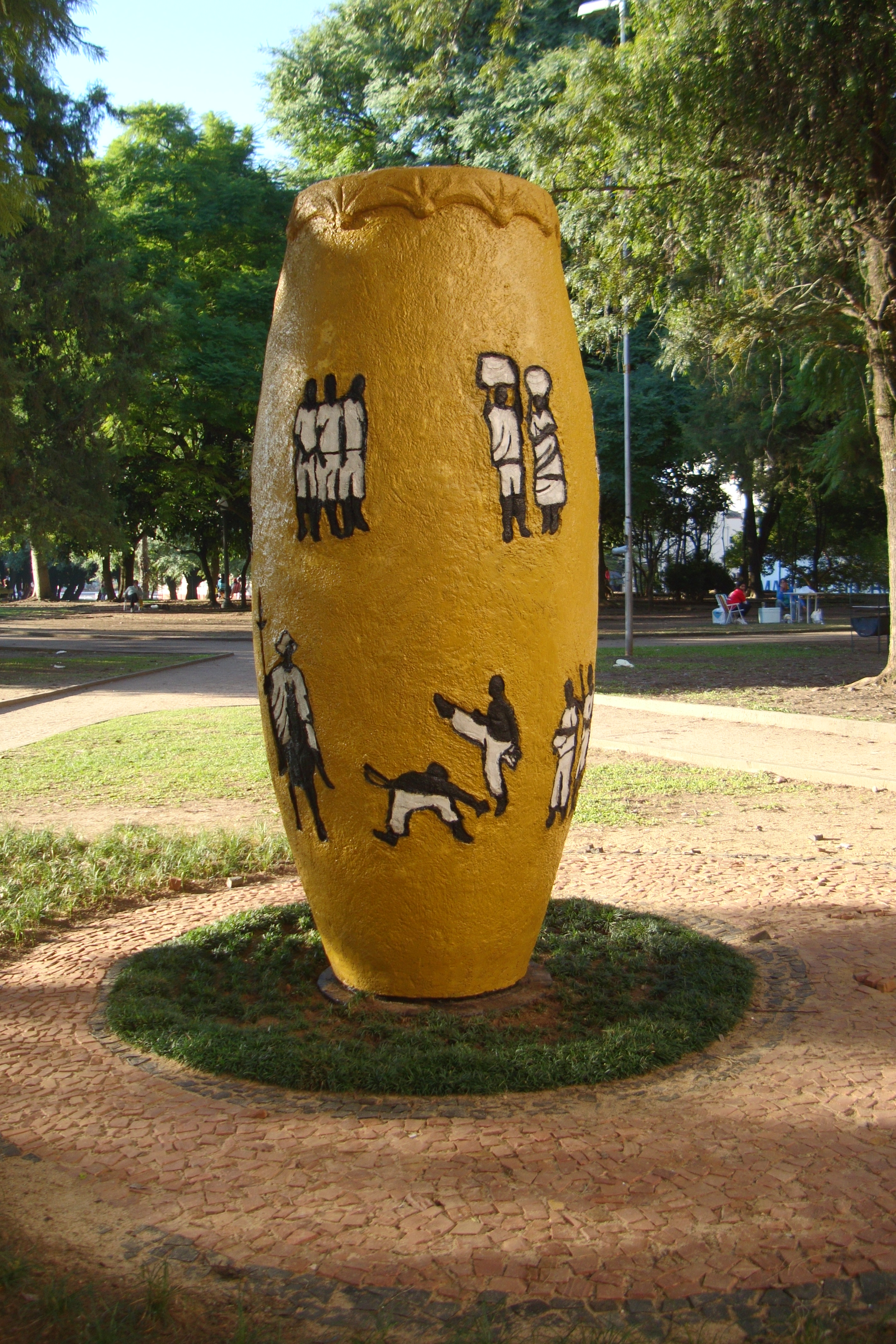
The "Tambor" monument at Brigadeiro Sampaio Square.

The route passes by urban landmarks, historic sites, works of art, and monuments located at various points in the Historic Center of Porto Alegre, which have a marked connection with the black community in terms of memory, identity, and citizenship. These include the Mauá Pier; the site of the old Pelourinho, in front of the Dores Church, where blacks were publicly punished; the old Zaire Corner, now called Democratic Corner, a meeting place for workers, carnival performers and musicians, and a concentration point for political demonstrations; This is where the first March of November 20 (Black Awareness Day) started; the of Our Lady of Rosário Church, headquarters of the black brotherhoods; the Santa Casa de Misericórdia; the old African Colony and the old Areal da Baronesa, where today survives the Areal Quilombo, one of eleven urban quilombos of Porto Alegre.

In addition to the existing historical landmarks, in the following stages, also with the support of the Monumenta Program, new works installed in significant locations were created: The "Tambor" (Drum), in the former Forca Square, where blacks were sentenced, now Brigadeiro Sampaio Square, the first to be installed, inaugurated on April 9, 2010; the mosaic "Pegada Africana" (African Footprints) in the former Quitanda Square, selling point of black women quitandeiras, now Alfândega Square; the Bará landmark in the Public Market, and the "Painel Afro-Brasileiro" (Afro-Brazilian Panel) in the Glênio Peres Square The City Hall maintains a program of guided tours of the route.

== Meaning ==
From the 19th century until the mid-20th century, black people suffered a continuous process of expulsion from the most central "noble zones", in projects of "hygienization", modernization and "whitening", being sent to the outskirts and abandoned by the public power. In this sense, for sociologist Elza Vieira da Rosa, the museum innovates in the way of representing black memory, and its creation in the Historic Center itself brings to the surface paths once trodden and places once inhabited by the black population, it brings "the possibility of reconstructing what was shattered, it installs places and monumentalizes them as places of memory, and "repositions the questioning about the use of public spaces in the city, about how monumentality was culturally constructed and which aspects prevailed in the construction of museums that could guarantee the memory of those who contributed in a unique way in the construction of Rio Grande do Sul's culture."

Museologist Vitória Carvalho considers it relevant as a way to combat silencing and stereotypical ways of representing the black, "strengthening the vision of the black as a significant actor in the construction of Brazilian culture." For historian Karitha Soares, "the Black History Museum in Porto Alegre is the historical affirmation of the Afro-gaúcho, the official registration in the Historical and Touristic Center of the presence, memory and heritage of Africans, changing the image of black people in the city's paradigm. It recreates a new look, carrying the joy, the foundations and the belonging of the base that built the municipality until the arrival of the Italian/German immigrants, and the beginning of reparation to the memory and the struggles of these ancestors."

For researcher Helena Bonetto, on the other hand, European heritage is still so prevalent in the city that this and other initiatives have not yet been sufficient to make visible "the black hands that were and are historical subjects that built Porto Alegre." The Black History Museum was one of the models that inspired Rio's Slavery and Black Consciousness Museum.

== See also ==
- African culture in Rio Grande do Sul
- Afro-Brazilians
- History of Rio Grande do Sul
- Black Awareness Day
- Abolitionism in Brazil
- Post-abolition in Brazil

== Bibliography ==
- Bonetto, Helena Bonetto (2019). "A invisibilidade negra na cidade de Porto Alegre: uma pesquisa sobre imaginários urbanos". Para Onde!?. 12 (1): 164–172. doi:10.22456/1982-0003.94117. hdl:10183/189048. ISSN 1982-0003.
- Carvalho, Vitória Bispo (2016). Provocações museilógicas: leituras da exposição "Mafro pela Vida, contra o Genocídio da Juventude Negra" – Salvador/BA (2015). Universidade Federal de Sergipe.
- Cova, Tatiane Paiva (2020). Feminismo negro e práticas artísticas no processo da decolonialidade. XIX Encontro de História da Anpuh-Rio.
- Rosa, Elza Vieira da (2019). Museu de Percurso do Negro em POA — Interrompendo invisibilidades, reinscrevendo experiências negras na cidade. Universidade Federal do Rio Grande do Sul.
- Soares, Karitha Regina (2017). O Grande Tambor (ou a força do tambor): o Museu do Percurso como resgate histórico da presença do negro na formação da cidade de Porto Alegre. Universidade Federal do Rio Grande do Sul.
- Vargas, Pedro Rubens (2013). Museu de Percurso do Negro na perspectiva de seus idealizadores: Os militantes do Movimento Negro. Edições Museu Júlio de Castilhos.
