= Casa de Cultura Mario Quintana =

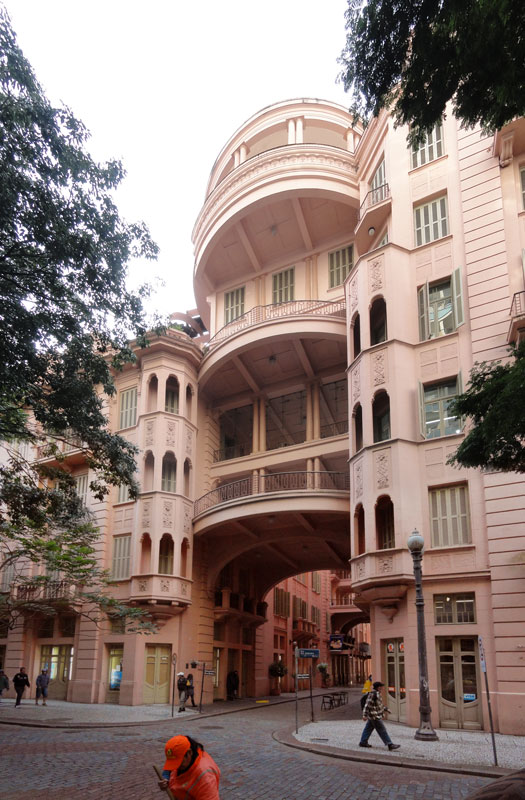
- Interactive map of the Casa de Cultura Mario Quintana area
- Former names: Hotel Majestic

General information
- Location: Porto Alegre; Río Grande do Sul; Brazil, Rua dos Andradas, n.° 736; Centro Histórico
- Coordinates: 30°01′53″S 51°14′04″W
- Construction started: 1916
- Opened: 1933
- Owner: Rio Grande do Sul state government

Design and construction
- Architects: Theodor Wiederspahn; Restauration: Flávio Kiefer and Joel Gorski

Casa de Cultura Mario Quintana (CCMQ) is a cultural center in Porto Alegre, in the Brazilian state of Rio Grande do Sul.

It is located in the former Hotel Majestic building, which had its heyday between the 1930 and the 1950 decades. Among its renowned guests were former presidents Getúlio Vargas and João Goulart and artists such as Vicente Celestino, Virgínia Lane and Francisco Alves. The center was named after poet Mário Quintana, who lived in the hotel between 1968 and 1980, in apartment 217.

== Architecture and history ==
Designed by the German-Brazilian architect Theodor Wiederspahn, it was the first large building in Porto Alegre to use reinforced concrete. Conceived to occupy both sides of the Araújo Ribeiro Passage, it has two blocks linked by large walkways connected to the ground by arcades and containing terraces, balconies and columns. This luxury hotel project, built by businessman Horácio de Carvalho, was considered revolutionary at the time, as the idea of suspended walkways over the public road was unprecedented in Brazil at the time.

Construction began in 1916 and in 1918, the first part of the building was completed. In 1926, the east part was projected. At the end of the work, in 1933, the Majestic had seven pavements in the east wing and five in the west wing.The design of the building combines historical styles.

With the city's urban development, its once privileged location became a security problem. The hotel entered into decline, cutting the number of guest rooms from 300 to 100, and began to house people on a permanent basis, including Mário Quintana.

The hotel was acquired in July 1980 by Banrisul so that the government of the state of Rio Grande do Sul could in turn acquire it at a more affordable price. The purchase was made on December 29, 1982. From 1983 onwards, the Porto Alegre city government promoted several projects to revitalize the historical center of the city, so that, among other structures, the Hotel Majestic was registered as a building of historical value and a cultural center under the responsibility of the state's Sub-secretariat of Culture began to be planned in there. The building was restored and the cultural project was developed between 1987 and September 25, 1990, when the Casa de Cultura Mario Quintana was inaugurated. The architects responsible for the internal transformation were Flávio Kiefer and Joel Gorski.

== Cultural spaces ==
The property, which belongs to the state of Rio Grande do Sul, has a wide variety of cultural spaces, such as the Lucília Minssen Library, the Érico Veríssimo Library, part of the Museum of Contemporary Art of Rio Grande do Sul, the Elis Regina and Mário Quintana collections, the Natho Henn public record collection, the Xico Stockinger and Sotéro Cosme galleries, the Bruno Kiefer and Carlos Carvalho theaters, in addition to three movie theaters, cafés, bombonière, bookstore and several rooms for specific purposes or multiple uses.

In 2002, the José Lutzenberger Garden was installed on the terrace of the fifth floor of the CCMQ, in honor of the environmentalist who died that year. The garden gathers plant species from marshes, deserts, prairies and tropics. Vases and bathtubs from the former Majestic hotel were reused to decorate the space.

=== Museum of Contemporary Art ===
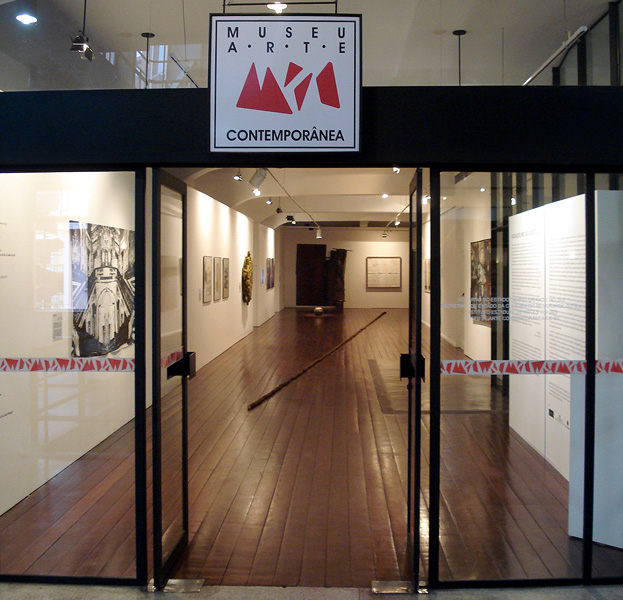
MAC-RS

Museu de Arte Contemporânea do Rio Grande do Sul is a contemporary art museum in Porto Alegre, Rio Grande do Sul, Brazil.

Created on March 4, 1992 and it is located on the 6th floor of the CCMQ, occupying the Xico Stockinger and Sotero Cosme galleries and the Microgaleria Tatata Pimentel.

The MACRS collection comprises 2,229 artworks from the second half of the 20th century to the present, covering various visual art forms. It mainly features Brazilian art, with a focus on contemporary artists from Rio Grande do Sul, along with works by international artists.

Its collection consists of works by artists such as Iole de Freitas, Felippe Moraes, Maria Lídia Magliani, Lia Menna Barreto, Dudi Maia Rosa and Vera Chaves Barcellos.

== Image gallery ==
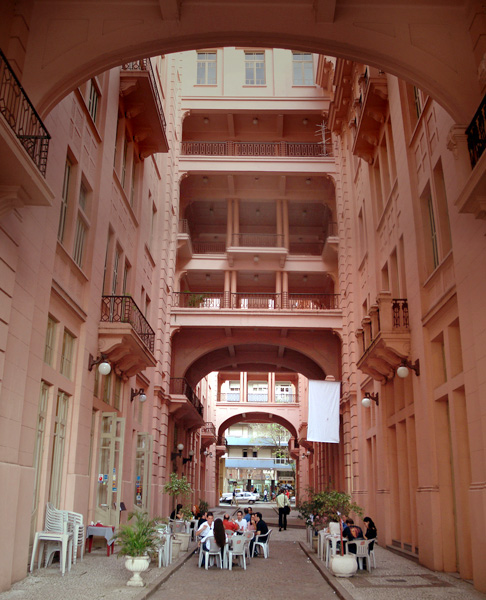
«Araújo Ribeiro» passage.

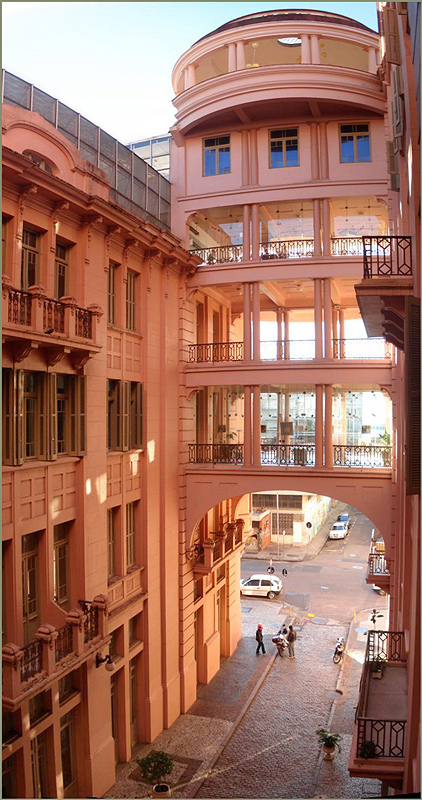
View from one of the walkways

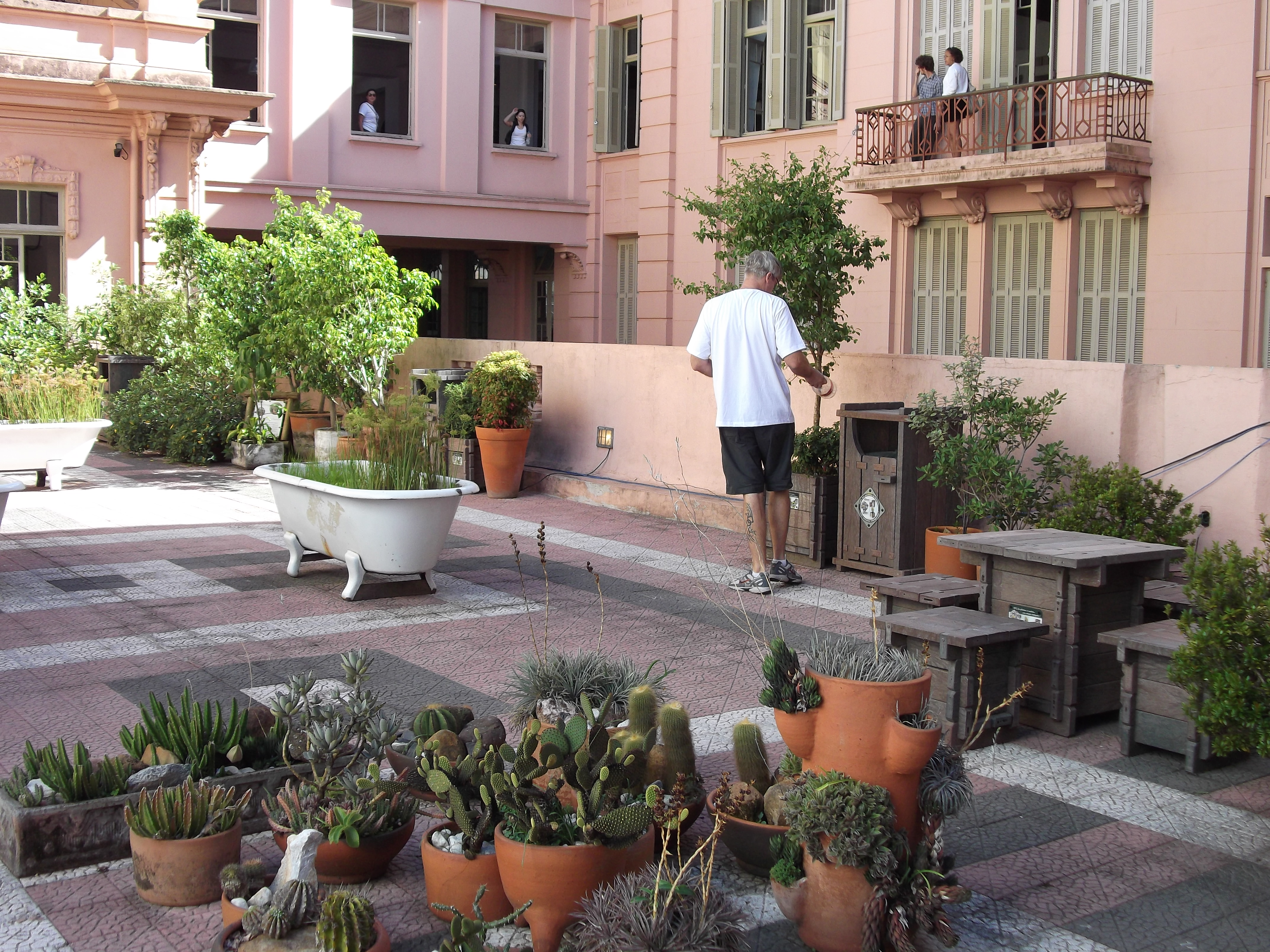
«José Lutzenberger» garden, on the fifth floor.

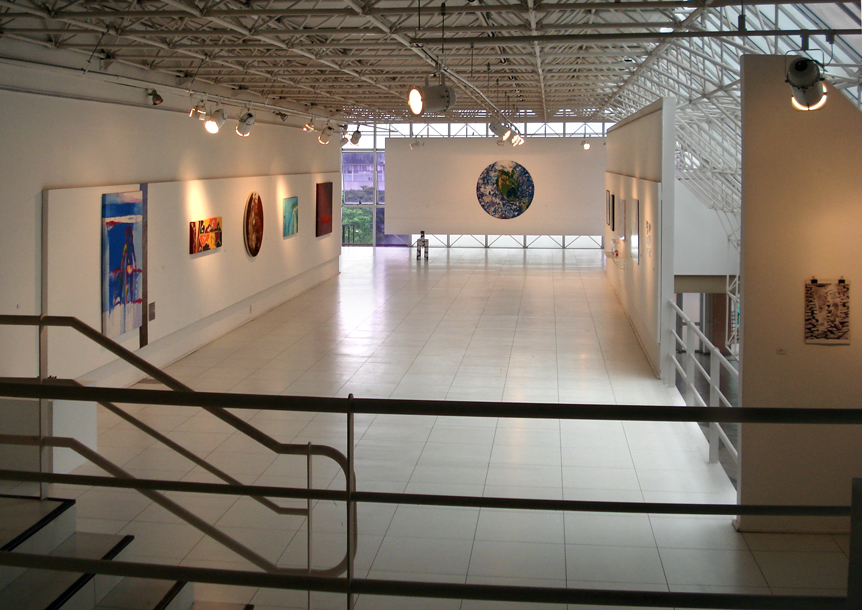
Art gallery.

== See also ==
- Mario Quintana
- Architecture of Porto Alegre
- Iberê Camargo Foundation
- Joaquim Felizardo Museum of Porto Alegre
- Júlio de Castilhos Museum
- Museum of the Black History in Porto Alegre
