= African culture in Rio Grande do Sul =

African Culture in Rio Grande do Sul refers to the history, attributes, and values of Afro-Brazilian culture in the Brazilian state of Rio Grande do Sul.

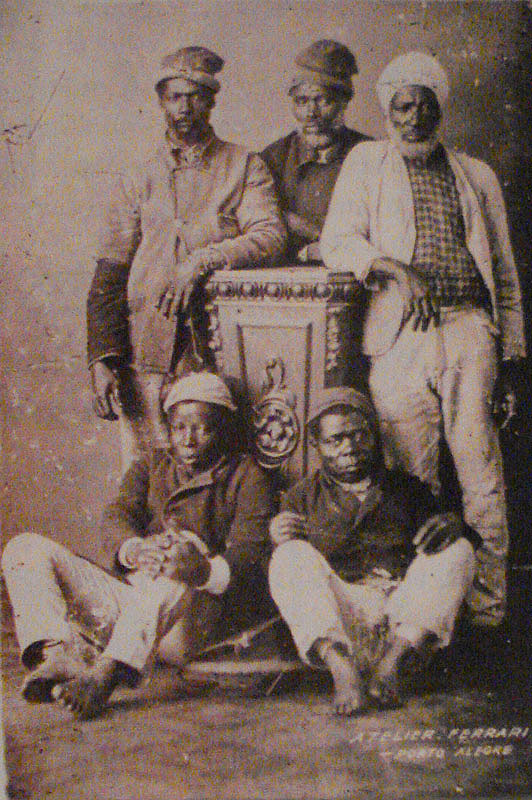
Freed Black people from Porto Alegre in 1884.

Black people were trafficked in the state as slaves in the early 18th century. In the early days, they were mainly forced to labor in the charqueadas, but soon began to work in a variety of manual labor jobs in the countryside and the cities, participating decisively in the consolidation of the regional economy, as well as playing an important role in military operations.

However, subject to frequent mistreatment, seen as mere merchandise and as a labor force that could be over exploited and had a low quality of life. After the abolition of slavery in 1888, they began a slow process of recovering their dignity and valuing their origins and customs, a process made difficult by the great prejudice that existed and still exists against African descendants.

== Overview ==
Contrary to the myths constructed by older historiography, the black presence in the state was significant from the beginning, although remaining a minority. In the same way, the culture developed by African descendants in Rio Grande do Sul has made an important contribution to the formation of the state's culture and society. The black movement in Rio Grande do Sul has managed to gain growing space and has made important achievements at multiple levels.

== The Black presence in Rio Grande do Sul ==
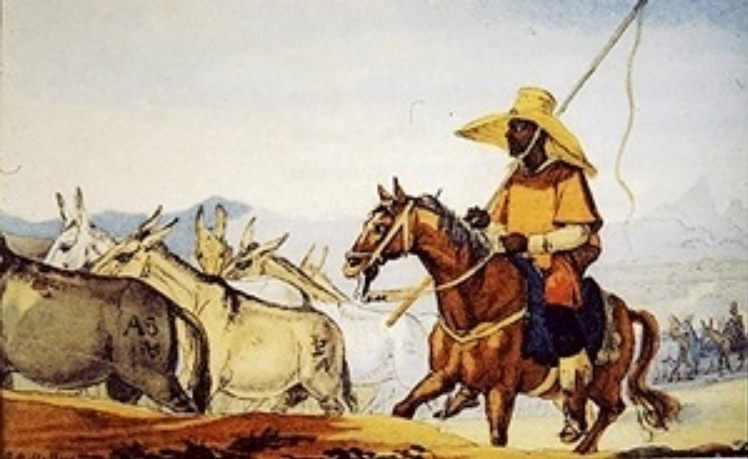
Slave leading a troop of mules in the province of Rio Grande, in watercolor by Debret.

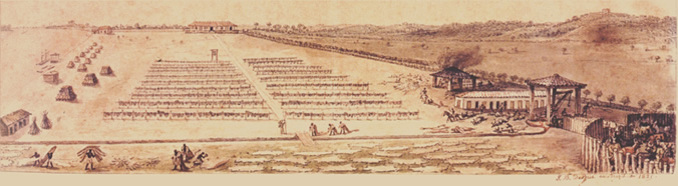
Charqueadas in Debret's watercolor.

As part of the former Kingdom of Portugal and later the Empire of Brazil, Rio Grande do Sul shared with the other parts of the country the slave culture introduced since the early days of Portuguese colonization. The presence of black slaves is attested in the state since the beginning of the 18th century when the territory began to be conquered from Spain, which was the original owner of these lands by the Treaty of Tordesillas. Between 1725 and 1727, a group led by the Portuguese João de Magalhães, mostly composed of slaves, was assigned to protect the Lagoa dos Patos, to establish a registry to collect taxes on cattle going to Laguna and to make alliances with the Indians.

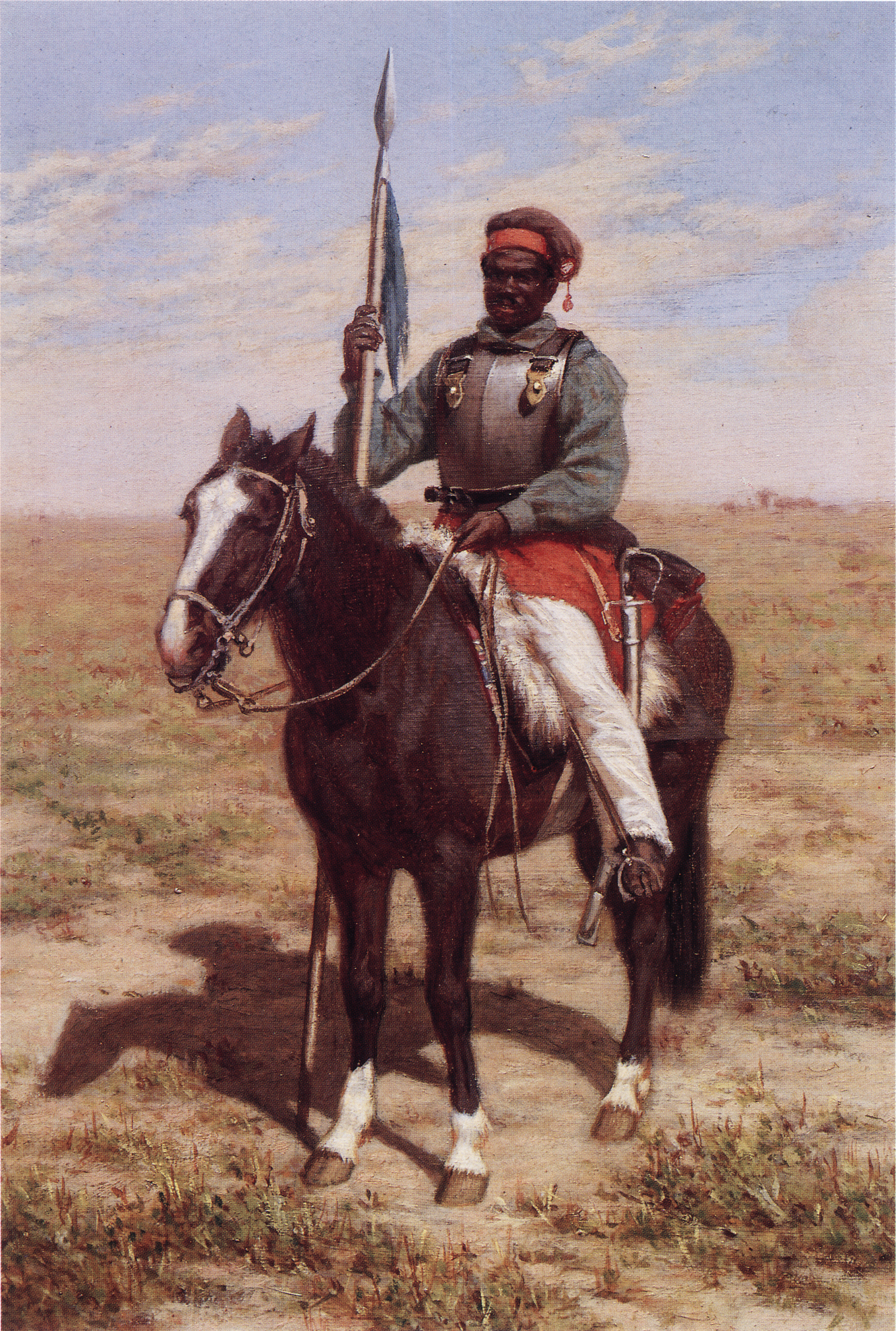
Portrait of a Black Lancer in oil by Juan Manuel Blanes.

In 1727, sergeant-major Francisco de Souza Faria opened with the help of slaves a road through the Serra do Nordeste to facilitate the passage of cattle from the south to the markets in the center of the country. They also participated in the expedition commanded by Brigadier José da Silva Pais to found the Jesus, Maria, José Fort in 1737, at Barra de Rio Grande. 190 slaves accompanied the Demarcator Army, in charge of implementing the territorial determinations established by the Madrid Treaty of 1750, and others arrived along with the Azorean settlers. It is likely, however, that they appeared much earlier, along with the exploratory expeditions of bandeirantes and tropeiros that had been occurring since the 17th century.

In the 18th century, slaves were mainly employed in the cattle ranches that were being founded. In 1780, 5,102 slaves were registered in the state, about 29% of the total population, not including the freed ones. From the first decade of the 19th century on, their presence more than doubled, as the charqueadas became the main economic activity of the province and demanded more labor. According to Gitibá Faustino, "the gold exploration in Minas Gerais, in the 18th century, had fundamental importance in the development of the gaucho (Note: The term gaucho was originally used to refer to Indian horsemen, cattle smugglers and ranch peons, but has expanded to include all the inhabitants of the Rio Grande do Sul state, whose early history is closely linked to the ranching culture. In this article, gaucho refers to the former and Gaúcho to the latter.) charqueadas, which became the supplying source of meat for the auriferous region."

Most of the kidnapped Africans came from Rio de Janeiro, entering through the port of Rio Grande. According to Gabriel Berute, 71% were captured in West-Central Africa (mainly Benguela and Angola), 26% in West Africa and the rest in East Africa. The majority were adult males. In the 1830s, the slave trade began to suffer progressive restrictions, but there is evidence that it continued clandestinely, although minimized. In this century their presence is also recorded in the region of Missões and Vale do Rio dos Sinos, and they were already numerous in the largest urban centers (Porto Alegre, Rio Grande, Pelotas), performing various functions and trade. Still, their largest concentration remained in the countryside, linked to farming activities.

Slaves had a high demand in wartime; during the Ragamuffin War (1835-1845), when they made up more than a third of the rebellious forces, together with mestizos, Indians, and runaway slaves from Uruguay, they played a relevant role, especially the black lancers ("lanceiros negros"), battalions made up of freed slaves who were decimated in the Porongos Massacre, an episode that has become emblematic and has fueled an extensive debate. A considerable mestizo population also began to form. The black and mixed-race contingent formed in the state was large: In the 1814 census, there were more non-whites than whites; at the abolition of slavery in 1888, the state was the sixth in the country in number of slaves. In Pelotas, for example, black and mixed-race people made up 30.7% of the population, and in Rio Grande, 27.4%. This labor force was responsible for much of the state's economic emancipation process, mainly due to its massive presence in the charqueadas, which until the late 19th century were the largest source of foreign exchange. Currently, African descendants make up about 20% of the Gaúcho population, and have contributed significantly to multiple areas of culture and society.

== Cultural flourishing ==
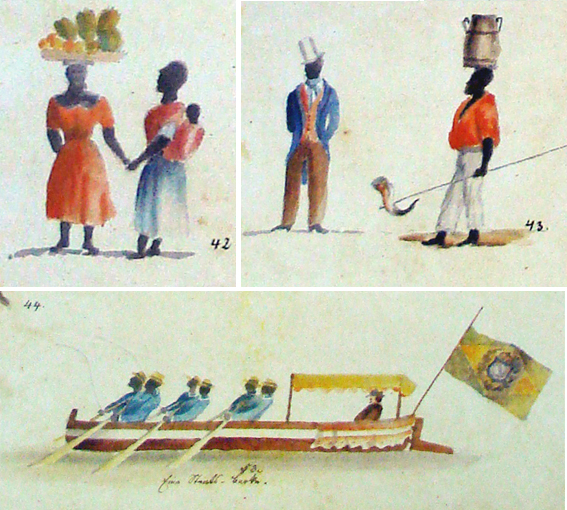
Negros do Rio Grande do Sul in 1851, watercolor by Herrmann Wendroth.

It was in the cities, especially in Porto Alegre, that blacks began to rehearse forms of resistance to white domination, and the quilombos, formed with runaway slaves, would play an important role in the preservation of their history, culture, identity and in the struggles for freedom. Some individuals began to accumulate a modest patrimony, for instance, when they were slaves "for hire", rented to others to provide services but being able to keep a small part of the profits. Research by Paulo Roberto Moreira showed that in the 19th century more than ten thousand manumissions were granted in Porto Alegre, and about 37% of them were paid by the slaves themselves, but only 19.23% were free, meaning they did not impose any conditional bond or obligation. The vast majority required work until the death of the master, or for a set period before being effective.

Some gained social recognition, especially the manumissioned, who could dedicate themselves to independent trades suffering less prejudice. Of note is the case of Inácio José Filgueira, a mulatto who bought his manumission and was able to occupy for many years, in the early 19th century, the position of kapellmeister of the Old Mother Church of Porto Alegre, but, typically, not without facing constant opposition. Studying the case of Pelotas, but reflecting a general reality, Beatriz Loner stated:

There was practically no manual profession that did not have representatives of this ethnic group in its performance, both in the imperial period and in the Republic. [There were many specialized workers among them, craftsmen who carried out their activities in the urban environment, as wage earners or owners of small workshops. [...] The quantity of urban and free blacks, in the last decade of the Empire, was such that it allowed two entities of mostly black artisans to be created in the city, the first of which, created in 1880, had about 40 members when it was founded, all free."

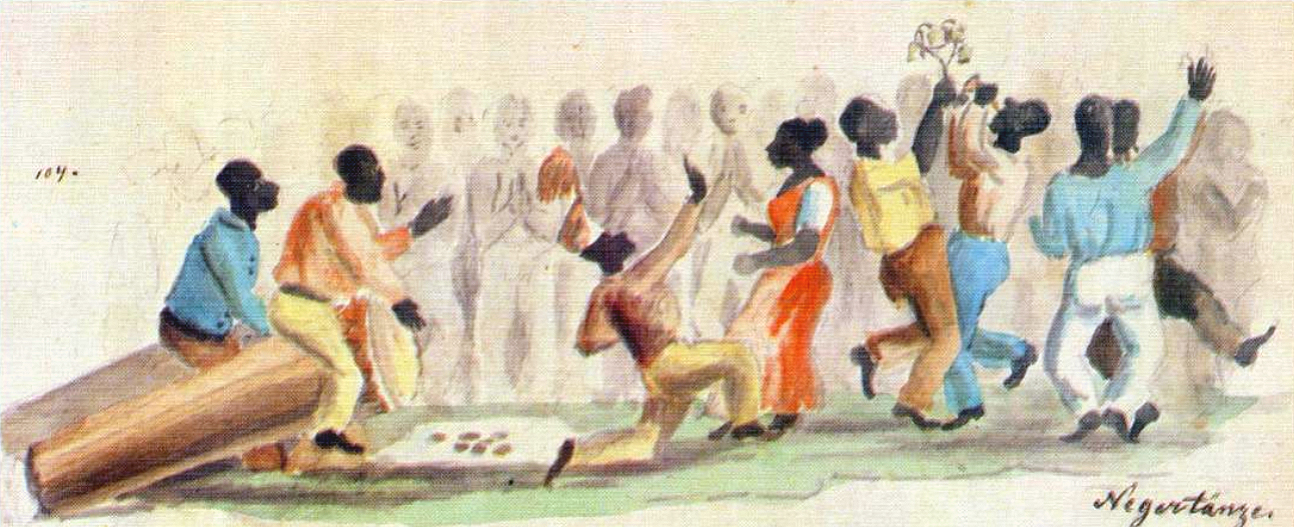
Danças negras ("Black Dances"), record from 1851, watercolor by Herrmann Wendroth

Many slaves in Porto Alegre, however, were allowed to live in houses of their own, and could rent rooms, making extra income. Several ghettos were formed in the city, where the black and mixed-race population was concentrated. The Cidade Baixa was one of the main ones. In other centers, such as Rio Grande and Pelotas, a similar process occurred. In these nuclei a distinct culture was born, marked by traditions brought from Africa, usually mixed with white culture, and expressed mainly in celebrations and religious cults. It resulted in the formation of a large number of black societies (or black social clubs), with dancing, theatrical, musical, recreational, welfare, sports, artistic, educational and mutual aid purposes. These societies evidenced the existence of a process of professional and intellectual qualification of blacks.

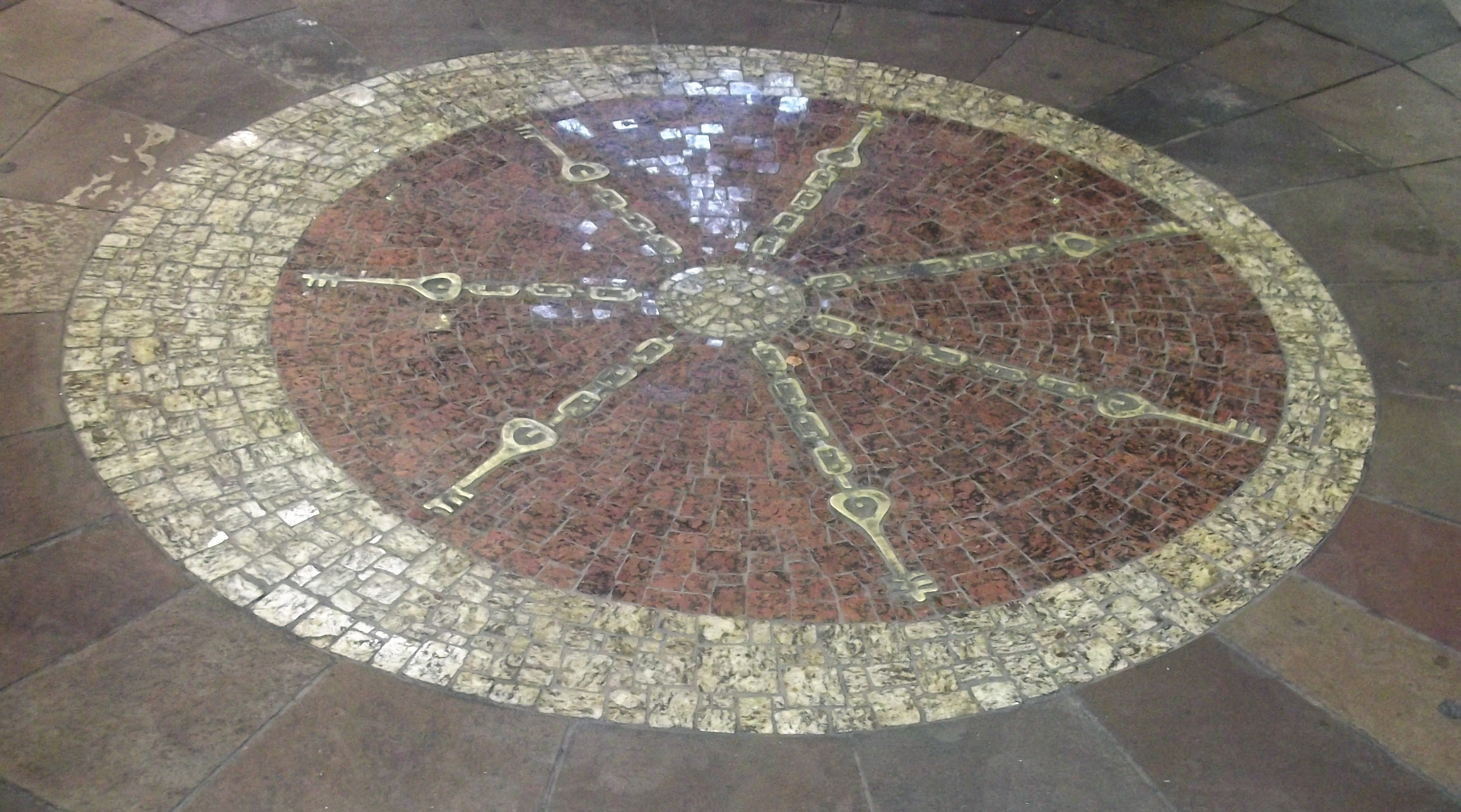
Mosaic marking the enthronement of Bará (Orisha) at the Porto Alegre Public Market

In the religious field, since the XIX century cults of African matrix have been registered in the state, and currently Rio Grande do Sul is the state where African manifestations have the greatest acceptance in Brazil, surpassing even Bahia and Rio de Janeiro, attracting interested people from all social layers, with some forms of wide penetration such as Batuque, Umbanda and Linha Cruzada, which share elements with similar ones in Brazil but have developed their own characteristics, and which Ari Pedro Oro calls "African-Gaúchas religions", besides more localized manifestations such as the Mozambique of Osório, the Quicumbi of Rio Pardo and the Ensaios of Mostardas. They also left their mark on the traditional Catholic cult. In almost all cities of relative importance, in the 19th century, Catholic brotherhoods of black and brown people were formed, giving birth to differentiated traditions. The Rosário brotherhoods stood out, founders of several churches, contributing to softening prejudices and valuing blacks as "good people."

African-Gaúcha culture took shape: Street festivals as Carnival had a massive black presence. Music flourished in sambas, choros, marches, and romantic songs, later producing personalities of great projection. The regional vocabulary contains hundreds of words of black origin. They also contributed with games, legends, cuisine, and sayings, such as "The axe forgets; the tree remembers," and "The horse that arrives early drinks the good water."

== Whitening processes and historiography of denial ==
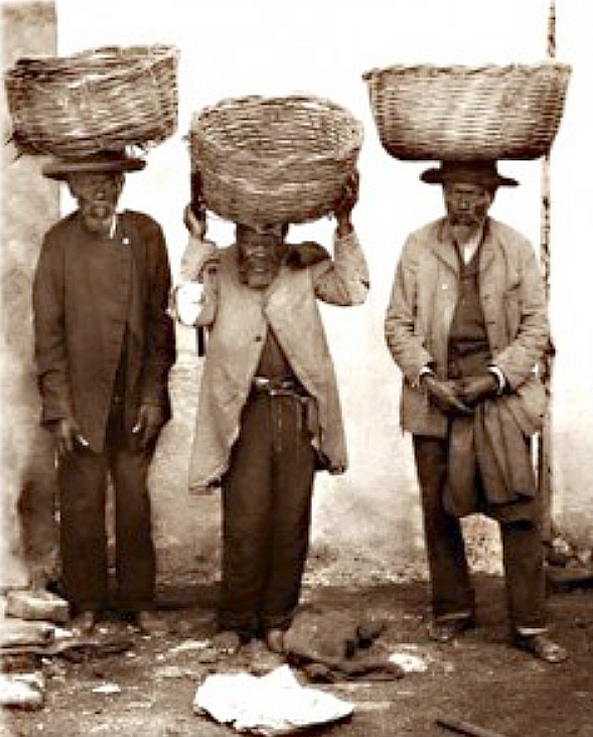
Blacks of Porto Alegre in 1895, photograph by Colembusch.

Despite the flourishing of black culture in the state, African-descendant groups interacted with difficulty with white society and tended to remain in "separate worlds". There was since the early days of slavery, an effort by officialdom to convert blacks to the dominant culture, a deliberate effort at cultural whitening, especially after the abolition of slavery, and the erasure of black memory. The introduction of large waves of German and Italian settlers in the 19th century was an important part of the attempt to whiten southern society, and the arrival of these settlers caused blacks to lose space, be considered less skilled, less healthy, and lower morality workers.

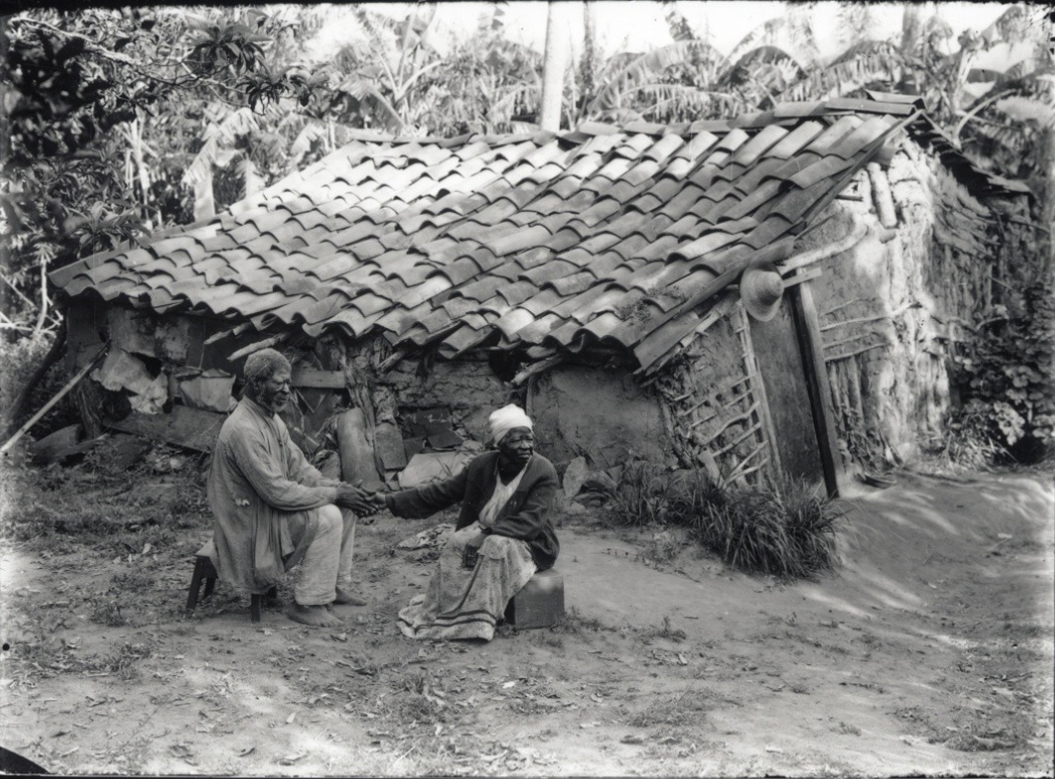
Blacks of Porto Alegre around 1900, photograph by Lunara.

The abolition of slavery did not change their situation for the better, and they began to live in sub-employment and sub-housing, without basic conditions of education, health, and sanitation. According to José Antônio dos Santos,

"The process of industrialization and urbanization that was instated, at the end of the 19th century and beginning of the 20th, demanded from the whole of Brazilian society new forms of social and political organization. The black workers who had been the supports of the primitive accumulation of capital in the charqueadas of Rio Grande do Sul, with the beginning of the immigration process in 1824, would increasingly occupy the edges of the emerging capitalism. In the cities, most of them lived in the worst places, in the tenements, on the hills, and in flooded areas; in the rural areas they became servants and godchildren who worked to eat and live on the lands of the former masters. In the post-abolition period, anti-black racism was the fundamental component of the construction of Gaúcho ideology and culture."

Theories of racial improvement and searches for rational explanations for racism, such as those advocated by Nina Rodrigues and Oliveira Vianna, which achieved considerable repercussion at the time, discouraged mestizaje or preached the cultural, intellectual and genetic inferiority of the Black. During the Getúlio Vargas government, the nationalist campaign of compulsory "sociocultural cysts" to homogenize society, erasing ethnic-cultural differences, aggravated the situation. In the words of Patrícia da Silva Pereira:

"The entire social sphere of this early 20th century was going through the problem of the proliferation of eugenicist studies, scientific racism, and the progressive expansion of the ideas of whitening in Brazil, where rulers and the population of the wealthier classes publicized the need to expand the coming of white European immigrants, who would 'whiten' the Brazilian population, having a hope that, even by miscegenating with blacks and Indians, they could 'save' the future of an entire nation, with purer genes and more likely to be socially successful."

Throughout the 19th century and into the 20th century, programs of urban sanitation and urban modernization sought to drive blacks to the outskirts of the cities. In Porto Alegre, in the 1950s, entire black communities, such as those of Cabo Rocha, Ilhota, Colônia Africana, and Areal da Baronesa, were removed from the center and sent to peripheral areas, forming neighborhoods such as Restinga and Vila Jardim.

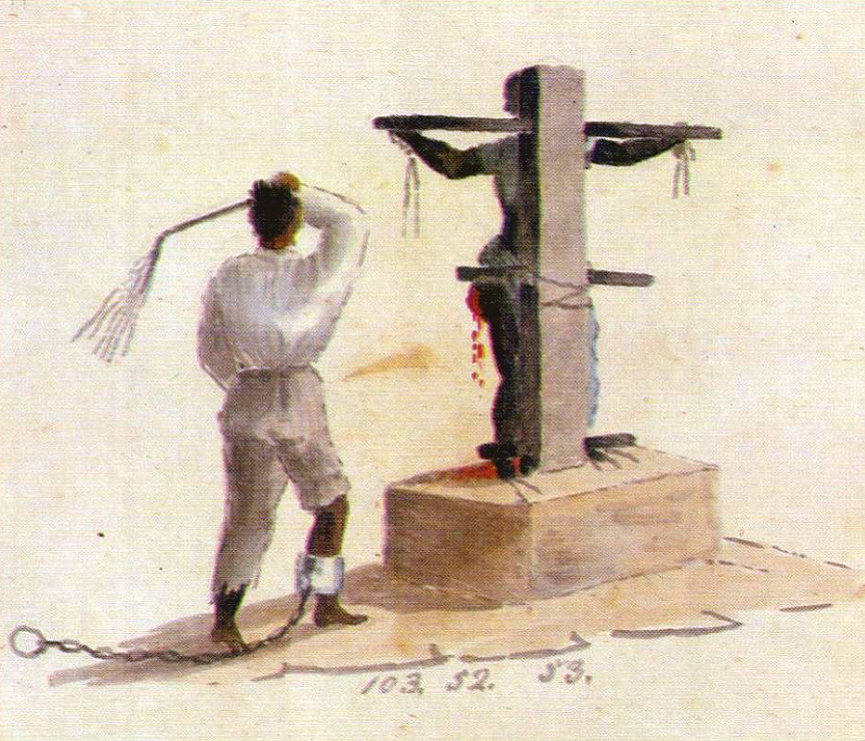
Negro no pelourinho ("Black at Pelourinho"), Herrmann Wendroth's record in Rio Grande do Sul in 1851

This process had an important reflection on historiography. Nineteenth-century writers tried to annul the peculiarities of the different black groups, homogenizing and stereotyping a culture that was originally dynamic and polymorphic, and throughout the twentieth century, for a long time, it was claimed that in the nineteenth century a "racial democracy" had existed in the state, where slaves were treated kindly and had a much higher quality of life than in other states. The speech of the province president on the eve of the abolition of slavery in Porto Alegre, in 1884, which established a form of freedom conditioned to additional compulsory labor for a number of years, stating that "the freedmen will prefer in their great majority to follow their former benefactors because in Rio Grande do Sul slavery was always a family institution, the slave participating in all the advantages of the masters, to whom they must be tied today by the bonds of gratitude and whose intelligence and experience they cannot do without." It was also claimed that the black presence had been insignificant and that the state culture had been built by whites. Recent studies have proved that these claims are myths and do not correspond to the facts, and have documented the inhumane treatment to which most slaves were subjected as well as the large contribution of blacks to the culture.

In Rio Grande do Sul, the gaucho figure was praised by historians as the synthesis of a people formed mostly by Portuguese descendants and a campeiro ("camper"): A manly, brave man, attached to traditions and accustomed to independence and freedom. This image generated a rich folklore and became the founding element of a regional socio-cultural identity that until the 1960-the 70s almost erased the contribution of other immigrants and ethnicities. In the words of ethnologist Ruben Oliven, "if the construction of this identity tends to exalt the figure of the gaucho to the detriment of the descendants of German and Italian settlers, it does so in an even more exclusionary way concerning the black and Indian."

== Recognition and the struggle against racism ==
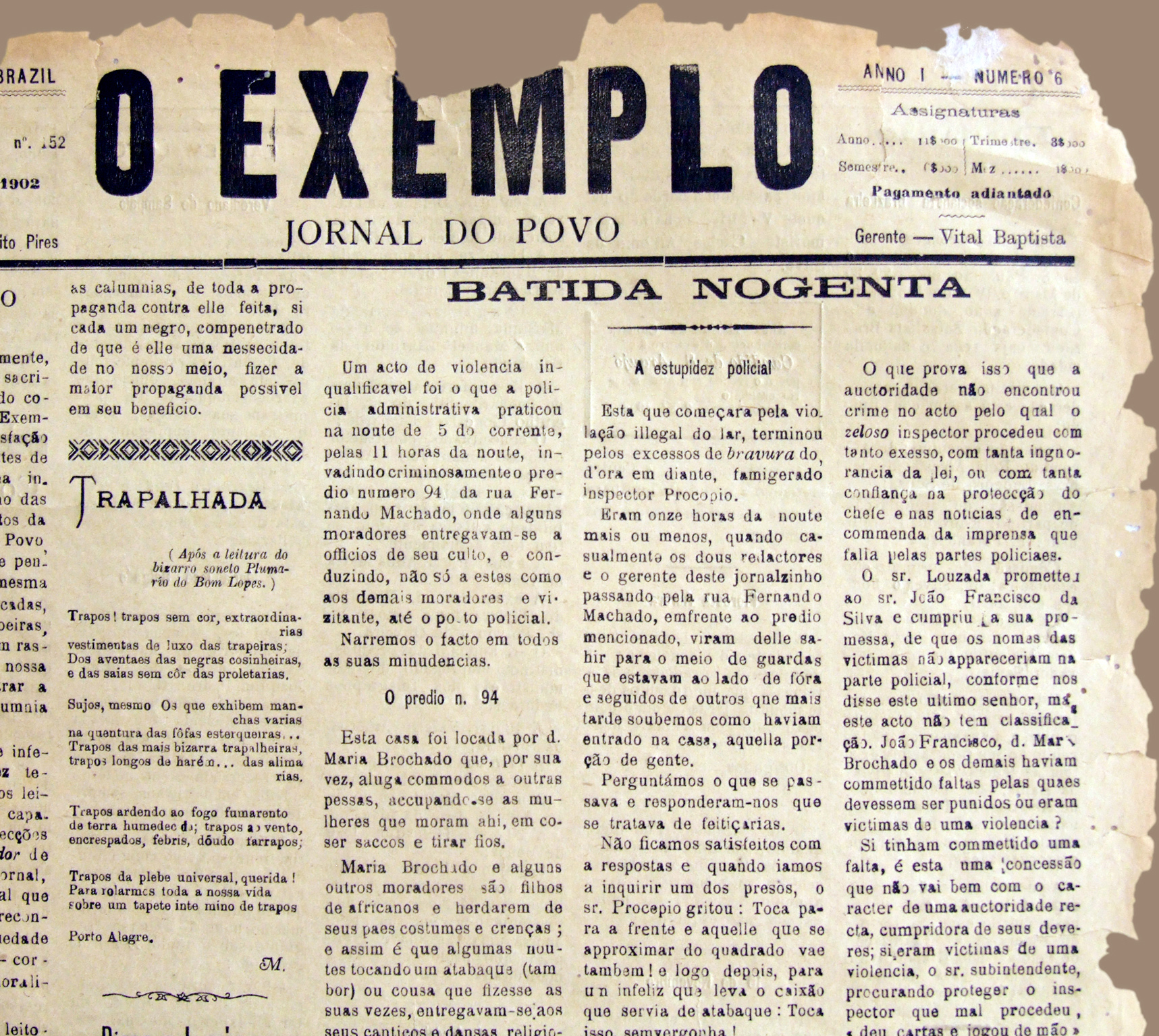
Detail from an issue of O Exemplo from 1902.

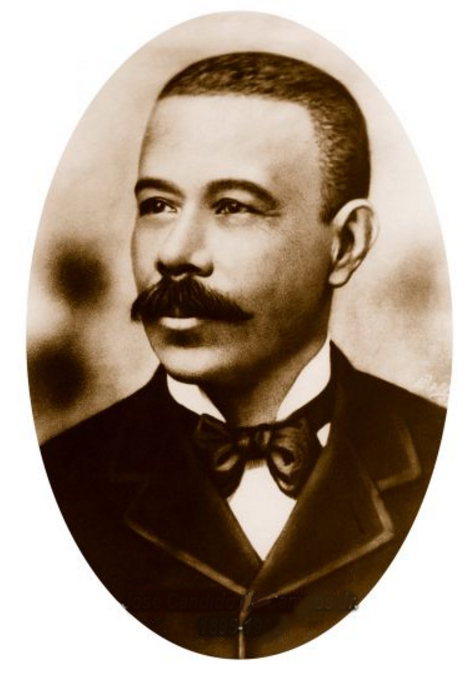
José Cândido de Campos Júnior, intendant of Caxias do Sul.

The movement for the rescue and valorization of African-Gaúcha culture was recorded throughout the 20th century, starting with a series of periodicals founded and run by blacks, dedicated to defending their banners, especially in the fields of discrimination, identity, collective organization, education, and professional training, such as O Tagarela (Rio Grande), A Alvorada (Pelotas), and O Exemplo (Porto Alegre). In the first three post-abolition decades, more than 50 black associative entities were founded in Pelotas; in Porto Alegre 72 clubs and recreational societies emerged, in addition to several mutual aid associations, which played a central role in the organization of the ethnic group. Religious brotherhoods were still active, strengthening the collective bonds. According to José Antônio dos Santos:

"Although the gregarious character is part of an African ethos, today celebrated as 'africanities,' we still have the marked influence of Catholicism in African-Brazilian culture, which also encouraged social organization and racial-ethnic solidarity. The mutual societies or mutual aid societies, recognized by the historiography of the workers' movement as the beginning of workers' organization, founded in the first decades of the Republic, had objectives very similar to the brotherhoods and third orders of the previous centuries. The black brotherhoods and the workers' mutual societies provided assistance in the event of illnesses, financial help in material difficulties, and in the funeral ceremonies of their members. Membership in both represented social recognition, the possibility of establishing contacts, solidarity bonds, and the attempt to get around or solve those problems. The black brotherhoods represented the class of the colored men having religiosity as their principle, the mutual societies were the beginning of the working-class formation. Both forms of social organization always had a strong black presence and were often attended by the same people. In this way, from the experience acquired, some black leaders were concerned to found the first unions."

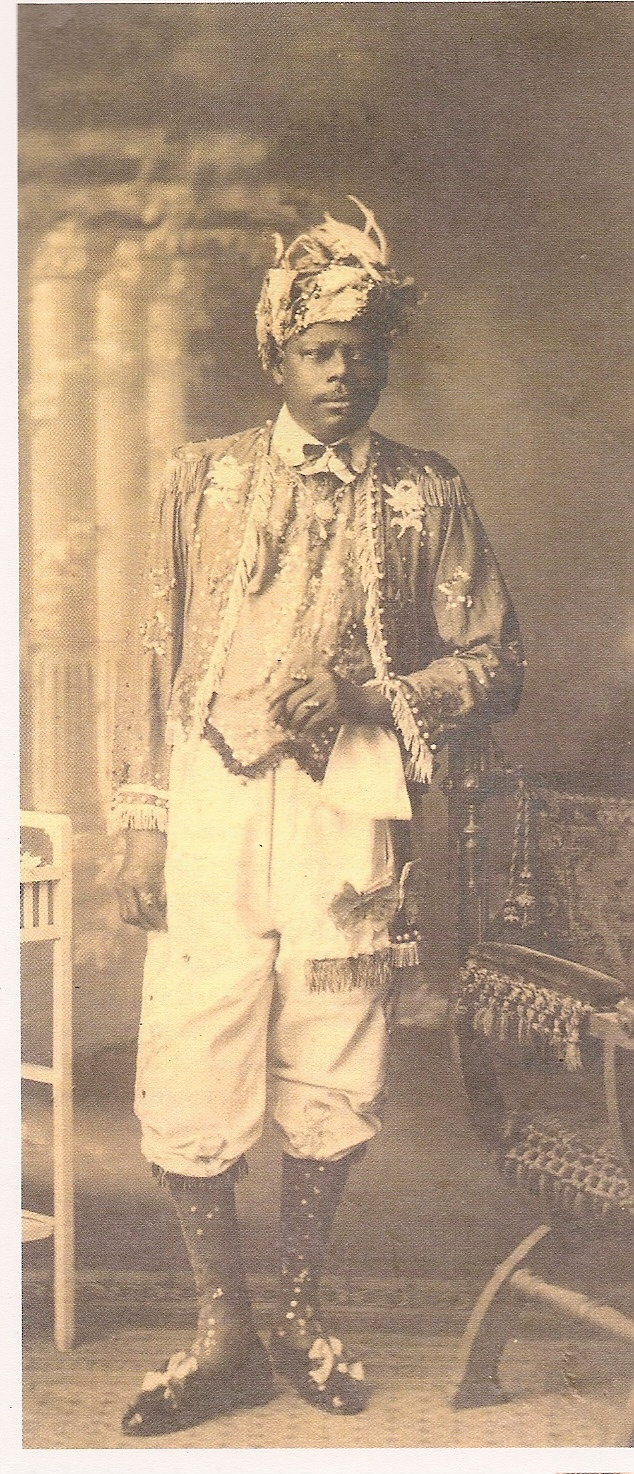
Prince Custodio

Many blacks were beginning to gain space and respectability in teaching, union organizing, and other areas, such as Dario de Bittencourt, lecturer and professor of law at UFRGS and director of the newspaper O Exemplo, Paulino Azurenha, considered by many authors the best literary chronicler of the state in the early 20th century and an important figure in journalism, and José Cândido de Campos Júnior, lawyer, district attorney, intendant of Caxias do Sul, and grand-master of the Masonic lodge Força e Fraternidade. An original and influential figure was Custódio Joaquim de Almeida, allegedly an African prince, who settled in Porto Alegre and died in 1935. He was a religious leader and important disseminator of batuque, had contacts in the elite and political class and was an aggregator of the black community. His figure was surrounded by rich folklore and became a symbol of the anti-racist struggle and for the free expression of African cults.

Political groups were also formed, in particular the Pelotense Black Front, created in 1933, claiming the end of racial discrimination and a better quality of life, having launched several deputy candidates; and the Union of Colored Men, founded in Porto Alegre in 1943, which spread to many Brazilian states, focused on the professional, intellectual and political qualification of the black and on the struggle for recognition of human and social rights, at a time when the black movement had expressive political force at the national level. In the 1950s, Florestan Fernandes was impressed by the vigor and stability of several black entities and associations in the state, a phenomenon he said he was unaware of in other parts of Brazil. In 1958, Porto Alegre hosted the first National Congress of the Negro, with delegations from several states, organized by Valter Santos of the Floresta Aurora Beneficent Society.

However, most initiatives were of no effect due to repression or lack of official support. The process gained new impetus, visibility, and political power when it began to receive academic attention in the 1970s. Although this production has helped overthrow historiographical myths of great influence in the past, prejudices at various levels are still strong and the state has an expressive number of reports of racism.

Much of the difficulty in better understanding the participation of blacks in regional history stems from their own historiographic invisibility. Significant records about them until the mid-twentieth century are few, and the unraveling of this forgotten history has largely occurred through oral history preserved in African-descendant communities, a type of study that suffers with the absence of written documentation. According to Maria Angélica Zubaran,

"for a long time, the memories and histories of Afro-Brazilians were limited to the reiteration of the stigma of slavery, to the representation of the black as a slave, a submissive victim of the punishments and misfortunes suffered in the slave society, forgetting and neglecting their struggles, achievements and, above all, their history. The reinventions of Afro-Brazilian culture and history in the post-abolition period were lost sight of."

According to Rosane Rubert, it is typical in the African-Brazilian communities of Rio Grande do Sul the care for the preservation of memory, especially in the transmission of memories of the time of slavery, "the concern of their ancestors in transmitting to the generations that succeeded them the dramas of a collective experience that reduced them to the condition of non-humans," building narratives "from which emerges a historicity that was massively suppressed, systematically dishonored and ceaselessly denied."

At the time when the academies started their activities in this field, the black movement was restructuring internationally, and it was no different in Rio Grande do Sul. In Porto Alegre, in the mid-1960s, some theater groups with important impact on the city's black political and cultural scene emerged. Soon after, Grupo Palmares was founded, which, according to Deivison de Campos, served as "a catalyst for the demands that belonged to the whole black community of Porto Alegre", destabilized by its deterritorialization, expelled from its old housing centers and pushed to the outskirts, seeking to "lead blacks to become aware of their social condition. [...] The whitening strategy had failed in its 'promise' of integration and the discourse of racial democracy proved to have no practical foundation. It remained the construction of a new alternative, now based on the affirmation of black identity." Palmares became a national reference and was the author of the proposal for the creation of Black Awareness Day. Also emerging was the Espaço Afro-sul Odomodê, a music and dance group with an important trajectory, interested in the dissemination and valorization of Afro-Brazilian culture and its origins, as well as developing social work with young people in street situations. In the early 1980s, the Unified Black Movement set up an arm in Rio Grande do Sul, with several Working Groups active in the state's interior.

Other forms of affirmation have come from the official recognition of quilombola communities, of which there are more than 160 scattered throughout the state, even within urban centers (urban quilombos). In Porto Alegre there are at least eight remaining communities: Machado, Família Lemos, Família Flores, Alpes, Família Ouro, Fidelix, Família Silva, and Areal. These communities constitute centers of resistance against oblivion, as well as having developed cultural expressions of unique characteristics, giving visibility, as Paulo Sérgio da Silva stated, to "a little-known face in the treatment of social issues in Rio Grande do Sul." However, as occurs in other areas, the recognition of these communities has been marked by controversy, difficulties, and conflicts.

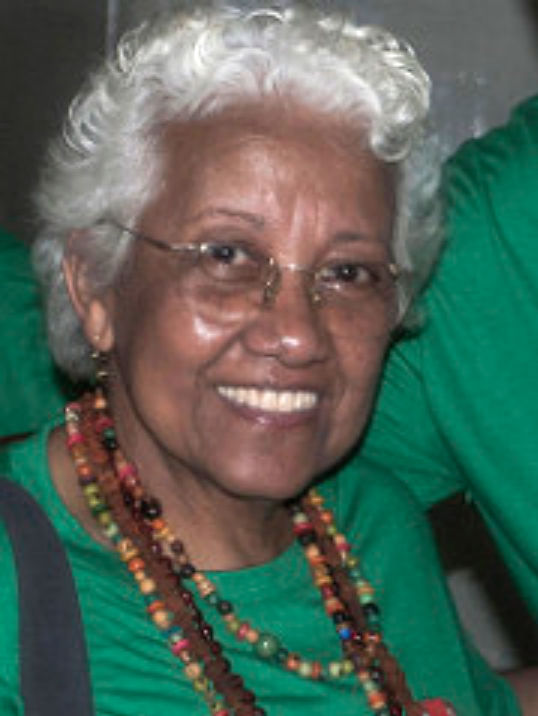
Irene Santos, a photographer from Porto Alegre, Brazil, is dedicated to researching African-Brazilian history and culture.

In recent years, collectives have also claimed their African heritage through the visual arts, such as Raízes da África, Quilombos Urbanos, and Frente Negra de Arte. Individual personalities have emerged, such as Maria Lídia Magliani, Carlos Alberto de Oliveira, Pedro Homero, Zé Darci, Silvia Victória, João Altair, and Pelópidas Thebano, often working with themes related to religious traditions and myths, but also to feminist, labor issues, among others that do not have a direct relation with ethnic themes.

Since 2012, the Sopapo Poético considered one of the most popular and frequented circles of literature, poetry, and music in Porto Alegre, has been in monthly activity. According to musician Vladimir Rodrigues, one of the founders of the event, it arose from the perception of the need to create a space to gather and share black culture. There are readings of texts, artistic presentations, an exchange of experiences and ideas. Among the most discussed topics are religion, ancestry, black love, self-esteem and image, appreciation of black beauty, stigmas and prejudices. Vera Lopes, Jessé Oliveira, Lilian Rocha, Jorge Moacir da Silva, Glau Barros, Pâmela Amaro, Josiane Acosta, Sirmar Antunes, Zilah Machado, Sidnei Borges, Djâmen Farias, Jorge Onifadê, Lupicínio Rodrigues, Horacina Correa, Vladimir Rodrigues, Celina Alcântara, Renato Borba, Nina Fola, Giba Giba, the group Instituto Brasilidades, Oliveira Silveira, the group Maracatu Truvão, the group Caixa Preta, Álvaro RosaCosta, among others, were or are references in poetry, literature, music, and theater in the state, many of them recognized on a larger scale through various awards.

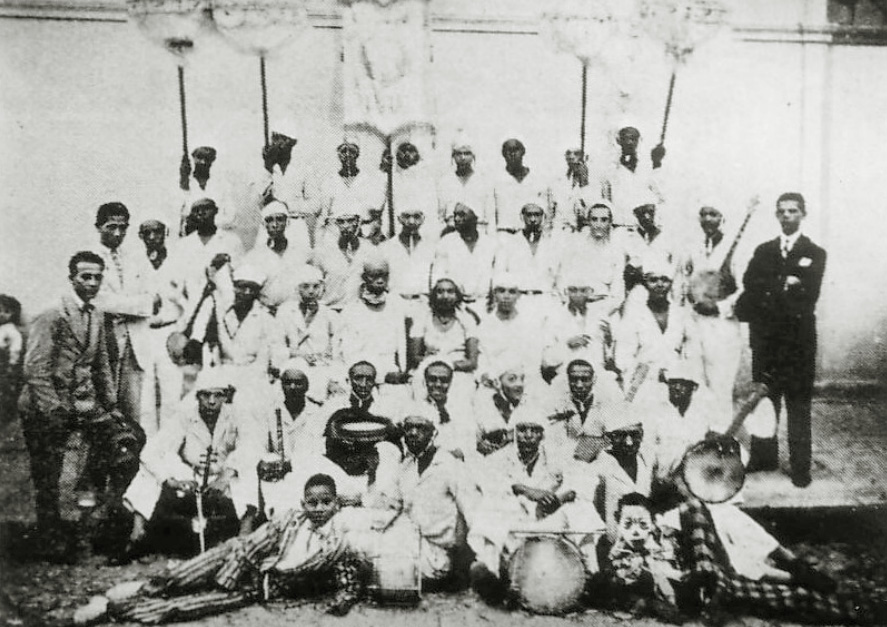
Cordão carnavalesco Os Turunas, from the African Colony of Porto Alegre, 1931.

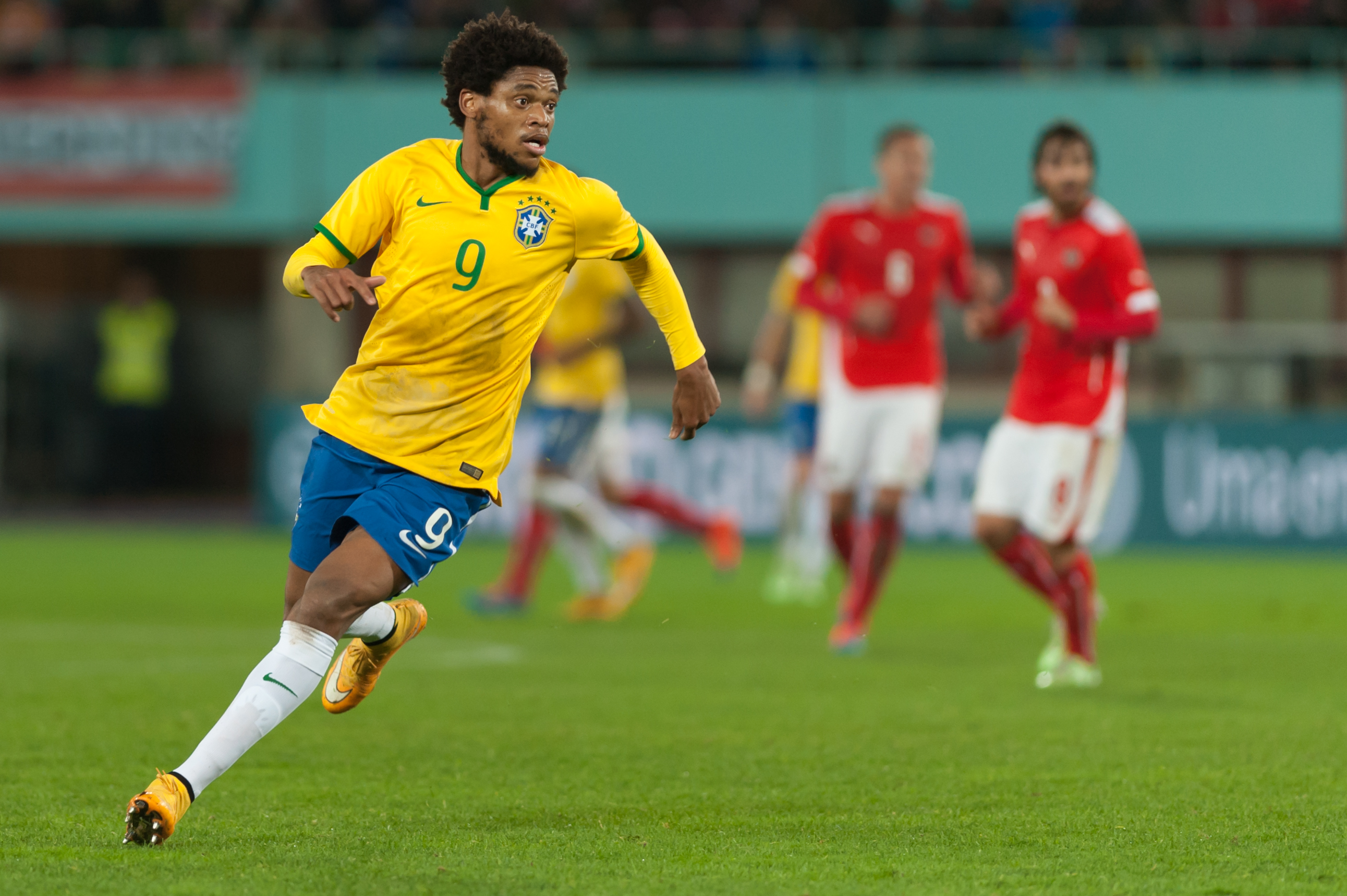
Luiz Adriano playing for the Brazilian National Team.

Music has been a fertile field for black expression, with a large population of artists dedicating themselves to a variety of genres, which include suingue, samba-canção, samba-rock, nativismo, pagode, reggae, and romantic music, counting on an audience of all ethnicities. In 2019, the First Contemporary Black Music Collection was launched at the Afro-Sul Odomodê Sociocultural Institute. The tradition of black musical groups and samba schools is old in the state. Samba schools, carnival groups, and societies, and the appropriation of the street carnival, in particular, were strongly aggregating elements for blacks since the 1940s, constituting, in the words of Íris Germano, "a way to celebrate their African memory, traditions, daily relationships, territories of sociability, ties of friendship, kinship, cronyism, solidarity, and also their disagreements." In Porto Alegre this process became emblematic, and still according to Germano,

"The festivities organized in these spaces by blocos, cordões, and black carnival societies have a special meaning for carnivalgoers to this day, as they are associated with a history of resistance, maintenance, and creation of ethnic boundaries by African descendants in the past, and are continuously evoked in the present. These ethnic references constituted in the past are still strong symbols of collective identification for these segments of the population, and the carnival is an important reference for the consolidation of black identity in Porto Alegre. These territories are still evoked today in the memories of carnivalgoers who lived in them, and also through the memory preserved and shared by the group, which has been passed from generation to generation until the present day, characterizing carnival, as well as these territories, as an important source of identity affirmation for black segments of the population, that is, as an important space for preserving the memory and history of the black community of Porto Alegre, composing the intangible heritage of this community."

Programs on African-Rio Grande do Sul culture exist in radios, TV stations, theaters, and other widely broadcast vehicles, but space and opportunities are limited and TV hosts of black origin are rare. In traditionalist gaucho festivities, such as in the popular Ragamuffin ("Farroupilha") Week, the black found space for recognition, participating with various guards of honor on horse and foot, which recover and celebrate the memory of the Lanceiros Negros and the work of black pedestrians on the cattle ranches.

Football, on the other hand, has been an area in which there is bigger professional recognition, which has not, however, eliminated discrimination. Since the 1940s an uninterrupted series of popular black idols has flourished, Tesourinha, Everaldo, Alcindo, Tarcísio Flecha Negra, Roger, and Ronaldinho are examples, who do not escape racism in spite of their fame: In 2016, Rio Grande do Sul was, for the second consecutive year, the state with the highest number of cases of reports of racism in sports. In 2010, the inequality in the Human Development Index between blacks and whites in Rio Grande do Sul was the highest in Brazil, according to data from the United Nations Development Program, and of all the cities in the state, the inequality was highest in Porto Alegre.

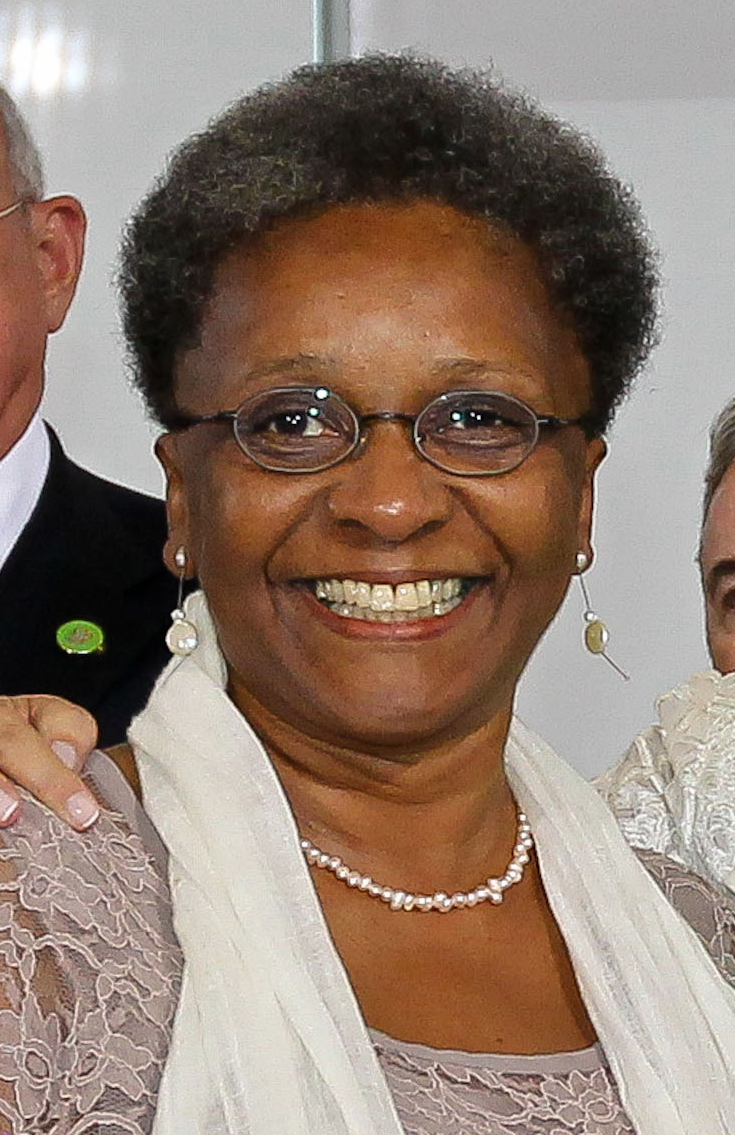
Luiza Helena de Bairros, chief minister of the Special Secretariat for Policies to Promote Racial Equality.

In 1988, the state government created the Council for Development and Participation of the Black Community of Rio Grande do Sul, in charge of developing studies and proposing measures and policies for the African-descendant community. Several other high-level public and private entities, associations, groups, universities, and commissions currently work for the valorization of African-Gaúcho culture, such as the Center for Black Culture of Rio Grande does Sul, the Cultural Association of Black Women, the Ecumenical Center for Black Culture, the Black Association for Culture, the Angola Janga Working Group, the African-Brazilian Reference Center, the Museum of the Black History, among many others, promoting research, debates, publications, and other activities. According to Allan da Rosa, "Black culture is characterized by the importance of its intellectuals, masters and organic thinkers, assumedly links of continuity and renewal of the cultures they embrace and by whom they are embraced." Luiza Helena de Bairros, a native of Porto Alegre, was chief minister of the Special Secretariat for Policies to Promote Racial Equality between 2011 and 2014.

Since 2003, teaching African and African-Brazilian culture in public and private schools has become mandatory, but many schools are not prepared to teach it. As the dominant culture in the state has been characterized by the concealment of African heritage, in 2015, the OAB-RS created the Black Slavery Truth Commission, inspired by the National Truth Commission on the crimes of the Dictatorship, with the goal of "accessing truths, ascertaining responsibilities and forwarding an agenda of reparation measures. [...] If, in most of the country, national identity was built on the notion of mestizaje (mixed-race), in Rio Grande do Sul it cultivated an ideal of Europeanity that excluded the black population. In this sense, the Commission needs to break through a cloak of invisibility: To execute reparation measures, it is necessary to affirm the existence of these historical subjects."

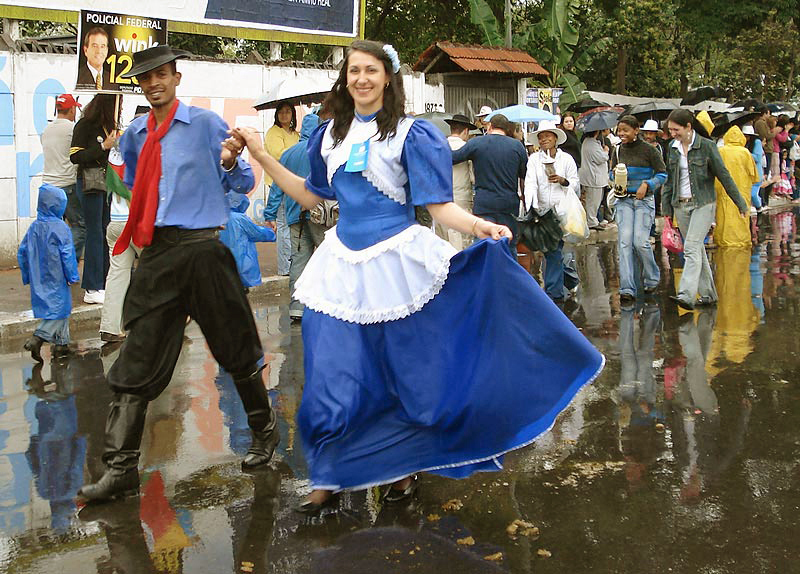
A couple wearing traditional gaucho costumes in the 2006 Farroupilha Week parade.

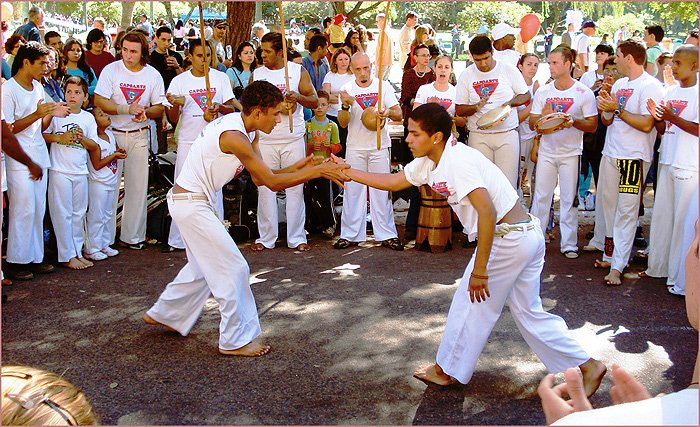
Roda de capoeira in Porto Alegre.

The black contribution to the state is of significance on a range of areas: Economy, the press, arts, spirituality, social movements, folklore, education, feminism, politics, and society; renewing and enriching the regional collective culture and identity and influencing the national reality. Although the formation of differentiated modalities of activism and of a regional culture with its own characteristics from the African heritage has already been patented, fruits of a peculiar geography, history, and context, "African-Gaúcho culture" as a scientific concept is in a process of construction and delimitation, but the term has already gained expressive popular acceptance. In the words of Paulo Romeu, a member of the African community interviewed by researcher Patrícia da Silva Pereira, the term "is being used more, in the popular sense. People are identifying themselves more, saying that it is African-Gaúcho. [...] We have an African worldview. We understand ourselves as Brazilians, this whole mixture of Brazilians, this whole mixture that we have of the African-Gaúcho, this mixture with Italians, Germans, Slovaks, Indians, Indians from the Andes, who are mostly Indians. This African-Gaúcho thing is very different from the African that is there in the northeast of Brazil." The confrontation with groups from other cultures highlights the specificities of local black groups, specificities that become the basis for collective mobilizations. For Silva Pereira:

"From this coexistence [of the blacks with other ethnicities], sometimes troubled, sometimes more peaceful, sometimes obligatory and servile, another way of living emerges that will definitely influence all the other cultures. This mixture of habits and cultures, which turned into a meeting of similarities and traced the creases where the differences were untouchable (for their maintenance and perpetuation), is what forged the identity of this African-Gaúcho. [...] To be African-Gaúcho is to understand all the different collaborations that were constituents of our black-African ancestry, brought from Africa in the memories of those kidnapped there, by the different ethnic groups brought as enslaved labor. It is to glimpse the similarities and differences with other native peoples who already lived here, who were also exploited and expropriated, in other ways and measures, but who resisted within their historical and material possibilities. It is to recognize the traces of the contributions of the settlers and colonists, who brought to our ancestors, who co-inhabited and cleared these lands and became their owners as well. [...] To be black (Afrobrasileiro), here is different from being black anywhere else in Brazil."

In Íris Germano's view,

"Even communicating difference, black culture inserted itself, coexisted, in its own way, with white reality. Therefore, the construction of black identity took place within this very white reality [...] since the ethnic border is constituted from the communication of differences and not through the isolation of a given culture. [...] Instead of this continuous cultural circularity representing the loss of cultural identity, the black culture, on the contrary, is continuously uprooted without ceasing to be black, without losing its identity, reinforcing the links of belonging to the same ethnic-social group; it manages to be Gaúcho and Brazilian, at the same time that it consolidates its African origin, its belonging to a black culture spread as a net all over the world and that is maintained due to this link of African ancestry, even having to face nationalist policies of whitening and de-enchantment. This is how the national samba fuses with reggae in the beat of the Bahian bloco Olodum, and this is how the African-Gaúcho bloco Odomodê produces in its drums the funk and samba-reggae beat accompanied by the sopapo, a typical black Gaúcho instrument. [...] And this is perhaps the great strength of black culture in Rio Grande do Sul, in Brazil or anywhere in the world: The ability to resist, maintain, and continuously recreate an intercontinental cultural identity, decentralized, uprooted, product of an immense circularity, fruit of the diaspora, but, even so, recognizably black and that has, as a common and sacred link, the African ancestry."

== See also ==
- Black movement in Brazil
- Afro-Brazilians
- History of Rio Grande do Sul

== Bibliography ==
- Salaini, Cristian Jobi (2006). "Nossos Heróis Não Morreram: um estudo antropológico sobre formas de "ser negro" e de "ser gaúcho" no estado do Rio Grande do Sul" (PDF). Mestrado. UFRGS.
- Pereira, Leandro Balejos (2010). Custódio Joaquim de Almeida (1831? - 1935): um Príncipe Africano em Porto Alegre que rezava, curava e treinava cavalos (in Portuguese). UFRGS. hdl:10183/28941.
