= Carlos Alberto Caó =

Caó

Federal deputy of Rio de Janeiro
- In office 1982–1983
- In office 1987–1990

Secretary of Work and Social Action of Rio de Janeiro
- In office 1990–1994

Secretary of Work and Housing of Rio de Janeiro
- In office 1983–1987

Personal details
- Born: Carlos Alberto Oliveira dos Santos; 20 December 1941 Salvador, Bahia, Brazil
- Died: 4 February 2018 (aged 76) Rio de Janeiro, Brazil
- Party: PDT (1981–2018)
- Education: Federal University of Rio de Janeiro

Carlos Alberto Oliveira dos Santos (20 December 1941 – 4 February 2018), also known as Caó, was a Brazilian lawyer, journalist, and politician. He was a federal deputy from the state of Rio de Janeiro in 1982 and from 1987 to 1990, as well as being a secretary in several state ministries in Rio de Janeiro from 1983 onward. A Black Brazilian, he was most well known for his anti-racism activism, being the author of the Lei Caó, which codified and defined racism as a crime in Brazil.

Caó was an activist with the Black movement in Brazil and was a member of the Democratic Labour Party (PDT). He was an advisor to the State Council of Black Rights of Rio de Janeiro (Cedine) and a member of the Brazilian Press Association (ABI).

== Early life and activism ==
Caó was born on 20 December 1941, in Salvador, Bahia, the son of seamstress Martinha Oliveira dos Santos and carpenter Themistocles Oliveira dos Santos. He began his involvement in politics as an adolescent. At 16, he became an activist with the neighborhood association of the neighborhood of Bairro Federação in Salvador. During this time, he also became engaged in the nationalist campaign O petróleo é nosso, which became a catalyst for the creation of Petrobras.

He was also an activist in the students' activist movement, and was elected president of the State Students Union of Bahia in 1963, as well as becoming the vice-president of the National Union of Students. During the military dictatorship, Caó was investigated and jailed for his activism. He was imprisoned after a military police investigation, but was released six months later, after a decision by the Superior Military Court.

He moved to Rio de Janeiro in 1964. In 1967, he graduated with a law degree from the Federal University of Rio de Janeiro Faculty of Law.

== Journalism ==
Caó's first work in journalism was with the newspaper Luta Democrática in 1964. In later years, he worked as a resporter with Diário Carioca, Tribuna da Imprensa, O Jornal and Jornal do Commercio, along with TV Tupi. In 1971, he joined Jornal do Brasil, initially as an economic reporter, assuming afterwards the position of Economics sub-editor and then editor.

In this period, Caó was one of the founders of the Association of Journalists Specializing in Economics and Finance (Ajef), created in 1974, and with which he was elected president in 1975. He also was the president of the Professional Journalists' Union of Rio de Janeiro from 1981 to 1984. He also created the Political Reporters' Club, of which he was secretary-general. It was during this time period that he began using the acronym Caó to mislead the military authorities.

== Political career ==
A member of the PDT at the invitation of its then-president Leonel Brizola, Caó was elected as a federal deputy from the state of Rio de Janeiro in 1982. However, he resigned from his mandate in 1983 to become the State Secretary of Work and Housing during the Brizola administration. As secretary, he led the implementation of the Cada Família, Um Lote program, created to regulate favelas and cladestine living situations. Up to 1985, the program regulated 32,817 lots of land.

He later ran in 1994 to become a senator from the state of Rio de Janeiro, but came in 6th place. He would run for other offices until 2002.

=== Constituent ===
In 1986, Caó left the position as state secretary to run again for the Chamber of Deputies. He was reelected and became a member of the National Constituent Assembly of 1988.

With the newly written Brazilian Constitution, he was responsible for the inclusion of section XLII of Article 5, that determined that the practice of racism constituted a non-bailable and imprescriptible crime.

Racism did not disappear, nor will it ever disappear. But the law caught it, yes. There is today in society a consciousness that racism is a crime. Society went from being less tolerant to requiring equality and not accepting discrimination. What made the law stick was the punishment.

— Carlos Alberto de Oliveira (Caó)

Approved in the Constitution, in 1988, Caó proposed law 688, which was the origin of Law 7.717/1989, which, in Brazil, is the law that defines hate crimes and discrimination based on race or color. The law regulated what had been written into the Constitution, which created typographies of racism as a crime, establishing prison sentences for the crime. Until that point, racism was considered by the Brazilian legislature as simply a penal contravention. The creation of these typographies of racism, as they were defined, were also created by Caó: Law n.º 7.437/1985 is known as "Lei Caó", and is the source of legislation on racism as a crime ("[which] includes, between the penal contraventions, the practice of acts resulting from prejudice of race, of color, of sex or marital status, given new wording to Law n.º 1.390, passed on 3 July 1951 - Afonso Arinos Law.")

== Personal life ==
Caó died on 4 February 2018, at age 76, in Rio de Janeiro.
