= Black movement in Brazil =

Movimento Negro (or Black Movement) is a generic name given to the diverse Afro-Brazilian social movements that occurred in 20th-century Brazil, particularly those movements that appeared in post-World War II Rio de Janeiro and São Paulo.

== History ==
Social movements involving Black groups are found throughout Brazil's history. However, until the abolition of slavery in 1888, these social movements were almost always clandestine and radical in nature since their main objective was the liberation of black slaves. Since slaves were treated like private property, escapes and insurrections threatened the social order along with causing economic harm. These insurrections became the object of violent repression not only by the ruling class, but also by the state and its agents.

== Pre-abolition Black resistance ==
=== Quilombos, Quilombolas, and Quilombagem ===
The principal form of embodiment of resistance against slavery by black rebel movements for nearly four centuries (1549–1888) was quilombagem. According to Clóvis Moura: "Quilombagem is understood as the permanent rebel movements organized and directed by the slaves throughout the national territory. Considered a provocative social change movement, it was a constant and significant demoralizing force for the slave system undermining the slave system on several levels—economic, social and military. This kind of activity greatly influenced the crisis that the slave economy experienced and was eventually substituted by free labor" (22, 1989).

Even though according to Moura the quilombagem had as its organizational center the quilombo where escaped slaves sought refuge in addition to all sort of individuals excluded and marginalized by society during the colonial era, the quilombagem comprised "other forms of individual or collective protests" such as insurrections (the most notable one being in Salvador in 1835) and bandoleirismo, a guerrilla tactic in which groups of escaped slaves organized themselves to attack groups of people and travelers on the roadways (Moura, 1989).

In Moura's study the quilombagem as an emancipatory movement "greatly precedes the liberal abolitionist movement" that only began to be more public after 1880 when slavery had already entered into crisis. Nevertheless, because of the absence of mediators between the rebel slaves and the ruling class, the problems surrounding the quilombagem could only be solved by violence and not through dialogue. Even though there existed exceptions like the Republic of Palmares which lasted for almost a century, most of the quilombola movements did not have the means to resist for long against the oppressive mechanism of the state.

=== From Inconfidências to Isabelismo ===
While the Inconfidência Mineira was a separatist movement without a popular base and an almost complete absence of blacks, it was opposed to the situation known as the Inconfidência Baiana, or the 1798 Revolt of the Alfaiates (Tailors). The objectives of the rebelling baianos were, according to Moura, "much more radical, and the proposal to liberate the slaves was one of the main goals of their objectives. Among its leaders and members were included "freed blacks, black slaves, pardo slaves, freed pardos, artesans, tailors; those who were from the most oppressed or discriminated classes of Bahia colonial society".

After the abolition of slavery, a certain portion of the black groups engaged themselves in the defense of Isabelism, a kind of cult to Princess Isabel who was given the name of "redeemer" as if abolition had been an "act of personal kindness" from the regent (Moura 1989). One of the most fervent believers of this movement was José do Patrocínio who sought to mobilize ex-slaves to defend the monarchy who had been threatened by the surge in groups who intended to establish a republic in Brazil. This movement culminated in the foundation of the Black Guard (Guarda Negra), a kind of shock troop composed of "capoeiras and marginalized individuals" whose principal function was to disperse republican rallies through the use of force. However, with the downfall of the Empire and the proclamation of the Republic, José do Patrocínio joined the winning side, and the Black Guard was dissolved.

=== From revolt to pacified resistance ===
With the end of the Empire different black groups joined a diversity of popular movements, particularly those messianic in character, such as that of Canudos and that of the blessed Lourenço. They even had a significant role in the Revolta da Chibata (Revolt of the Lash or Whip) in 1910 which was led by the sailor João Cândido. Through this revolt, Cândido succeeded in making the Brazilian Navy stop applying the punishment of flogging to sailors who were in their majority black. Despite this victory and a promise of amnesty the leadership of the movement was almost completely exterminated a year later. Even João Cândido who had survived purged by the government, lived out the final days of his life forgotten and in misery.

The Revolt of Chibata was virtually the last organized armed black rebellion that took place in Brazil. From then on black groups sought out alternative forms of resistance, "especially in leisure, cultural or sport groups" (Moura 1989). This pacific form of resistance already existed during the era of slavery even though it was not the only existing instrument of resistance.

Since these practices did not occur in a social vacuum, Moura alerts to the fact that these groups did not conserve their original purity since they "suffered the acculturated influence (that is, whitening) of the dominant ideological mechanism. It is an ideological-cultural battle that is fought on all levels, even before our very eyes" (Moura 1989). Moura gives examples referring to the samba schools of Rio de Janeiro that from spontaneous popular manifestations during the first decades of the 20th century converted into a highly lucrative business for its directors that relied on official protection from the state.

== The Black Movement in the 20th century ==
=== Genesis: 1915-1945 ===
With São Paulo and Rio de Janeiro as principal centers of mobilization, the Afro-Brazilian social movements began to forge new paths beginning in the 1910s in an attempt to fight for the recently acquired citizenship and transform themselves into national organization. The first major manifestation is the emergence of the black paulista (São Paulo) press, whose first newspaper, the Menelick, begins to circulate in 1915. It is followed by A Rua (The Street) in 1916, O Alfinete (The Pin) in 1918, A Liberdade (Liberty) in 1919, A Sentinela (The Guardian) in 1920, O Getulino and O Clarim d'Alvorada (Clear Daybreak) in 1924. This wave of publications last until 1963 when O Correio d'Ébano was closed down. All of these newspapers were characterized by the fact of not covering major national events (which they carefully avoided). According to Moura, it "was a highly specialized press in its information and directed to a specific public" (1989).

Because of this melting pot of ideological culture promoted by the black paulistana press, one of the most interesting national Afro-Brazilian movements is developed in the 1930s, the Frente Negra Brasileira (FNB - Brazilian Black Front). Established on September 16, 1931 due to a strong centralized organization in the form of a "Grand Counsel" of 20 members and presided over by a chief or boss (this caused it to be accused of being a fascist movement). Relying on thousands of members and sympathizers, the FNB had a featured role in the fight against racial discrimination, for example, having been responsible for the inclusion of blacks in the Public Force of São Paulo. After attaining success, the FNB decided to establish itself as a political party, and in doing allowed them to be involved in the Electoral Tribunal in 1936.

However, FNB's life as a political party was short. In 1937 with a decree by the Estado Novo of Getúlio Vargas, all political parties, including the FNB, were declared illegal and dissolved. From that moment until redemocratization in 1945, black social movements had to recede back to their traditional forms of cultural resistance. The only possible exception during this period (but is categorized as cultural resistance) is connected to the actions of Abdias do Nascimento whom in 1944 in Rio de Janeiro founded the Teatro Experimental do Negro (TEN - Black Experimental Theater). Nascimento was responsible for an expressive theatrical production that sought to boost "the consciousness of black Brazilians" and combat racial discrimination (Moura 1989).

=== Rearticulation: 1945–1975 ===
Beginning in the 1950s, the black movements initiated a slow cycle of rearticulation that is marked by the founding of the Associação Cultural do Negro (ACN - Black Cultural Association) in São Paulo in 1954. Even though it emerged as an ideological assertion movement, the ACN did not neglect providing assistance to its members by establishing culture, sport, student and feminine departments, and even a Recreation Committee. After a period of expansion, it entered a phase of decline and experienced a time of inactivity. It reemerged on May 13, 1977 with objectives focused more on assistance and philanthropy that included the creation of a school and free literacy courses. However, according to Moura, the ACN had lost "its initial ethos" and had to shut down its activities soon after.

In 1975 the Instituto de Pesquisa e Cultura Negra (IPCN - Black Culture and Research Institute) is founded in Rio de Janeiro. It is an organization of great relevance for the black movement, and its sustainment is due to the contribution of hundreds of partners. One of the few entities to have their own facilities, the IPCN encountered financial problems at the end of the 1980s having to subsequently shut its doors.

=== 1975-1995 ===
The Movimento Negro Unificado Contra a Discriminação Racial (MNU) was founded in 1978. It emerged as part of a public protest on July 7, 1978 against the torture of Robson Silveira da Luz at the Guaianases police headquarters in São Paulo; the discrimination of four Afro-Brazilian athletes at the Tietê Regatta Club, and the police killing of Nilton Lourenço, a worker. The date, July 7, would later be known as the National Day to Combat Racism. The MNU created Centros de Luta (Fighting Centers) in cities and town across Brazil to promote social activism at the local level. The MNU led to the creation of the first public body dedicated to the support of Afro-Brazilian social movements in 1984, known as the Participation Council And Development of the Black Community. André Franco Montoro, a governor of São Paulo, championed the movement, which ultimately criminalized racism in the Brazilian Constitution of 1988. The definition of racism as a crime was established by the Caó Law of 1989, written by Carlos Alberto Caó.

In 1989, a documentary, Ori, narrated by Beatriz Nascimento and directed by Raquel Gerber was released which explored the relationship between Africa and Brazil and traced the trajectory of the Black Movement in the country.

In 1991, CONEN, the National Coordination of Black Entities, arose as a new organization in the Black Movement. CONEN's objective was to combat racism within Brazil and bring racial visibility to socioeconomic issues. The National Coordination of Black Entities frequently appeared at protests and conferences to advocate against racial discrimination. Large demonstrations such as the Zumbi Dos Palmares March in 1995 were brought together with assistance from CONEN and other organizations in Brazil fighting against racism.

In 1995, the Zumbi Dos Palmares march took place on the 300th year anniversary of Zumbi Dos Palmares' death, as a fight against the inequalities Black Brazilians were facing.

Black women's movement 20th century

Discrimination of black women in Brazil came from a patriarchal society that believed women to be inferior to men, that their belonging was in the household and solely in the domestics. Black women fought against this wanting to bee seen citizens worth to gain independence, in the workforce, education and politics as well as dispelling the notions that held them back for so long.

New Urban Movements

New Urban Movements arose in Brazil around the mid-20th century focusing on Black people fighting against Brazil's authoritarian system of government. They held progressive goals wanting to advocate for marginalized people so they are able to speak against the issue affecting themself and the community with aid of the Brazilian Catholic Church, in that doing so would hopefully gain more community participation. Liberal political members and educators also came together working to educate and promote already thought ideas of these black urban people to circulate their ideals better.

Due to the large number of black women who are dispositionally discriminated against and residing in favelas or shantytowns, black women make up a large amount of the number of people who are in these urban movements. These women then go on to be a part of Christian Based Communities (CEB) which focus on the general health care of lower-income, as well as lobbying and getting their communities to sign petitions for welfare services and overall equal rights and participation in education and workforce.

In the 1970s Brazilian women found themself entering the workforce in higher numbers than seen in the past years. These jobs were surrounded around domestics like cooking cleaning and child care, with this they were often underpaid, leading them to take on multiple shifts. Unable to provide the child care essentials for their own families' household. The women residents of Jardim das Camelias Sao Paulo joined organizations that fought for a daycare center as well as a neighborhood health center. Women led and attended meetings that would discuss the effectiveness and strategies of these welfare systems in the community.

As women enter higher education, then offset into professional occupational categories “Black female professionals earned 48 percent less than their white, female counterparts” (Alvarez 17). Wanting to move forward from a male-dominated society middle-class women “rights to which their new professional roles entitled them“ (Alvarez 17). 1970-80’s university-educated women started feminist movements fighting for rights to their bodily autonomy, equality in health care, and education, and fighting against male violence against women.

== See also ==
- Afro-Brazilian
- Négritude
- Afro-Brazilian literature
- African culture in Rio Grande do Sul

== Bibliography ==
- HANCHARD, Michael George. Orpheus and Power: The Movimento Negro of Rio de Janeiro and São Paulo, Brazil, 1945-1988. Princeton University Press, 1998. ISBN 0-691-00270-3
- MOURA, Clóvis. História do negro brasileiro. São Paulo:Ática, 1989. ISBN 85-08-03452-0.
- NASCIMENTO, Abdias (org.). O Negro revoltado. Rio de Janeiro: Nova Fronteira, 1982.
- SANT'ANA, Luiz Carlos. Breve Memorial do Movimento Negro no Rio de Janeiro. Papéis Avulsos, Rio de Janeiro, CIEC/UFRJ, nº 53, 1998
- PASCHEL, TIANNA S. “RETHINKING RACE, RETHINKING MOVEMENTS.” In Becoming Black Political Subjects: Movements and Ethno-Racial Rights in Colombia and Brazil, 220–38. Princeton University Press, 2016
- Alvarez, Sonia E. “Women in the New Social Movements of Urban Brazil.” In Engendering Democracy in Brazil: Women’s Movements in Transition Politics, 37–56. Princeton University Press, 1990.
