= Michael Hanchard =

American political scientist

- Education: Tufts University; The New School for Social Research; Princeton University
- Awards: Ralph J. Bunche Award, APSA
- Scientific career
- Fields: Africana Studies; Political science; Latin American Studies
- Workplaces: The University of Texas at Austin; Northwestern University; Johns Hopkins University; University of Pennsylvania

Michael Hanchard, often published as Michael G. Hanchard, is an American political scientist, currently the Gustave C. Kuemmerle Professor of Africana Studies at the University of Pennsylvania. He is also the director of the Marginalized Populations Project there. He studies comparative politics and political theory, focusing on understanding the causes and consequences of nationalism and xenophobia, particularly within democracies.

== Education and early career ==
Hanchard studied international relations at Tufts University, obtaining an AB in 1981. He then pursued an MA in international relations from The New School for Social Research, graduating in 1985. Finally, he received a PhD in politics from Princeton University in 1991. Before becoming a professor at the University of Pennsylvania, Hanchard was a faculty member at The University of Texas at Austin and subsequently at Northwestern University, where he was the director of the Northwestern's Institute for Diaspora Studies, and later at Johns Hopkins University, where he joined the faculty in 2006.

== Career ==
Hanchard has published four books, as well as numerous book chapters and articles in journals like Public Culture and Theory, Culture & Society. Hanchard's first book, Orpheus and Power: Afro-Brazilian Social Movements in Rio de Janeiro and São Paulo, Brazil, was published in 1994 and arose out of his PhD dissertation work. With archival and research interview methods, the book used neo-Gramscian reasoning to argue that inequality and racism in Brazil persist because of deliberate efforts to prevent the development of racial group identifications there. Hanchard's sixty interviews with Afro-Brazilian activists in São Paulo and Rio de Janeiro suggest that this lack of group identification has prevented the formation of successful political movements to agitate against group oppression.

In 2018, Hanchard published The Spectre of Race: How Discrimination Haunts Western Democracy, which argues that contemporary trends towards racism and xenophobia have in fact always been visible in exclusionary policies that are historically ingrained in democratic practices. Political scientist Lilly Goren wrote that The Spectre of Race is "a rich and complex examination of the question of discrimination in general, and racial discrimination specifically", and particularly how the phenomenon of discrimination "has generally shaped the structures and institutions of western democracies". The Spectre of Race received the American Political Science Association's 2019 Ralph J. Bunche Award, which is awarded each year to "the best scholarly work in political science that explores the phenomenon of ethnic and cultural pluralism". The Race and Ethnic politics section award committee wrote that The Spectre of Race is "an outstanding contribution to political science scholarship on racial and ethnic domination and hierarchy".

Hanchard's service to the field has included serving as department chair of the University of Pennsylvania's Africana Studies department. Hanchard is also the director of the Marginalized Populations Project at the University of Pennsylvania, which examines the relationship between national governments and populations that lack sufficient state protections. He founded this project after conducting dissertation work with Afro-Brazilian activists, and observing the vulnerability of Afro-Brazilian children in Brazilian society and politics.

Hanchard was a 2014-2015 member of the School of Social Science at Princeton's Institute for Advanced Study. He has also held visiting positions across North America, South America, Europe, and Africa, including at Harvard University, the Federal University of São Carlos, the Sciences Po, and the University of Ghana.

Hanchard's work has been cited in media outlets like The Nation, NPR, New Statesman, and The New Republic. His book The Spectre of Race was featured in a Times Higher Education list of "the best books of the season" for winter 2018.

== Selected works ==
- Orpheus and Power: Afro-Brazilian Social Movements in Rio de Janeiro and São Paulo, Brazil, 1945-1988 (1994)
- Racial Politics in Contemporary Brazil (1999)
- Party/Politics: Horizons in Black Political Thought (2006)
- The Spectre of Race: How Discrimination Haunts Western Democracy (2018)

== Selected awards ==
- Ralph J. Bunche Award, American Political Science Association (2019)
