= Batuque (religion) =

Religion of Brazil

Batuque is an Afro-Brazilian religion, practiced mainly in Brazil. The Batuque pantheon includes spirits rather than gods, who are mostly thought to come in two types: Orixás and encantados or guias (anthropomorphic spirits who "inhabit the tangible world" and mostly come from Brazil, although there are foreigners in their ranka). It is simile as to Candomblé religion, and present in Bahia state in Brazil. Mediumship and spirit possession are integral to Batuque worship.

== History ==
The religion was founded in the city of Porto Alegre, the capital of Rio Grande do Sul state, by Custódio Joaquim de Almeida (his name in his original country was "Osuanlele Okizi Erupê") in the late 19th or early 20th century. Referred to as "the Prince" by the people in the region, he is claiming to have been a deposed Oba (king) from Benin. The religion spread and is still present in Santa Catarina state, as well as Recife and Belém. Even after Almeida’s death in 1935 at 103 years old, the religion continued spreading through neighbouring Uruguay, Argentina and Chile.

== See also ==
- Batuque (Brazil) – Afro-Brazilian drumming ceremonies
