= Dudi Maia Rosa =

Brazilian artist (born 1946)

Dudi Maia Rosa (born Rafael Maia Rosa on 26 December 1946) is a Brazilian artist.

== Biography ==
Dudi Maia Rosa was born in São Paulo in 1946. His initial training was related to artist Wesley Duke Lee and the context of the art school Escola Brasil: in the 1970s. Such experience began his intense didactic activity as teacher of drawing, watercolour and painting in the following decades. Dudi has taught in Escola Brasil:, in his studio, and institutions like SESC, São Paulo Museum of Modern Art and Instituto Tomie Ohtake.

Dudi Maia Rosa had his first solo exhibition in 1978 at MASP, presenting paintings and sculptures. His work began to stand out in Brazilian art from the early 1980s, when the artist inaugurated pioneering procedures to question painting from the use of different supports and materials that have remained, to this date, as trademarks of his work.

He has continued his teaching activity with various workshops, such as Festival de Artes Plásticas in Governador Celso Ramos, Curso de trainees at Folha de S.Paulo and Festival de Inverno Serrinha (Bragança Paulista – SP)., as well as in several lectures, seminars and debates. He has also been jury in Edital de Oficinas Livres at Centro Cultural São Paulo and the XXIV and XXXI Salão de Arte in Ribeirão Preto.

He has held several solo exhibitions in São Paulo and Rio de Janeiro and participated in many national and international exhibitions such as Panorama da Arte Atual Brasileira, at São Paulo Museum of Modern Art, in 1973, 1986, 1989, 1993; in 1987 and 1994 editions of the São Paulo Art Biennial; in Biennial of Johannesburg, South Africa, in 1995; in Mostra do Redescobrimento: Brasil 500 Anos, at Pavilhão da Bienal de São Paulo in 2000; and recently in 2005, in the V Bienal do Mercosul in Porto Alegre.

Important solo exhibitions were "Eu Sou um Outro" in 2008 at Instituto Tomie Ohtake, and "Plásticos" at Galeria Millan in 2009.

One of his most recent series, "Cábulas", was presented at Galeria Millan, in 2012, followed by Maria Antônia University Center in São Paulo, and Instituto Figueiredo Ferraz in Ribeirão Preto, in 2013. Many of his works belong to important art collections, such as Pinacoteca do Estado de São Paulo, MASP, Museum of Modern Art, Rio de Janeiro, São Paulo Museum of Modern Art, Coleção Itaú and Stedelijk Museum (Amsterdam, Netherlands). In 2016, he has presented a solo exhibition at Galeria Millan, entitled "VRIDO" and composed of about 50 new works of pigmented polyester resin and fiberglass.

== Book ==
In 2006, the book entitled "Dudi Maia Rosa and the deaths of painting" was released, written by Oswaldo Correa da Costa and edited by Metalivros. The launching coincided with the opening of his solo exhibition "Naipes" at Galeria Brito Cimino

== Selected solo exhibitions ==
1978 Pinturas e Esculturas, Museu de Arte de São Paulo Assis Chateaubriand – MASP, SP.

1979 100 Aquarelas, Galeria Pindorama, São Paulo, SP.

1980 Pinturas, Cooperativa dos Artistas Plásticos de São Paulo, SP.

1982 Pinturas, Galeria São Paulo, SP.

1984 Fibers, Thomas Cohn Arte Contemporânea, Rio de Janeiro, RJ.

1985 Fibers, Galeria Subdistrito, São Paulo, SP.

1986 Portas, Thomas Cohn Arte Contemporânea, Rio de Janeiro, RJ.

1989 Pinturas, Galeria Subdistrito, São Paulo, SP.

1991 Galeria Subdistrito, São Paulo, SP.

Ciclo de Esculturas do Centro Cultural São Paulo, Capela do Morumbi, SP.

1993 Ciclo Arte Contemporânea Brasileira, Instituto Estadual de Artes Visuais, Casa de Cultura Mário Quintana, Porto Alegre, RS.

Galeria André Millan, São Paulo, SP.

1997 Galeria Valú Oria, São Paulo, SP.

1998 Desenhos, Centro Cultural São Paulo, SP.

2001 Pinturas, Galeria Brito Cimino, São Paulo, SP

Gravuras, Museu Victor Meirelles, Florianópolis, SC.

2002 Centro Universitário Maria Antônia, São Paulo, SP.

2004 Galeria Brito Cimino, São Paulo, SP.

Guest Artist, III Mostra do Programa de Exposições 2004, Centro Cultural São Paulo, SP.

2006 Naipes, Galeria Brito Cimino, São Paulo, SP.

Mercedes Viegas Arte Contemporânea, Rio de Janeiro, RJ.

2008 Eu Sou um Outro, Instituto Tomie Ohtake, São Paulo, SP.

2009 Plásticos, Galeria Millan, São Paulo, SP.

2012 Cábulas, Galeria Millan, São Paulo, SP.

2013 Cábulas, Centro Universitário Maria Antônia, São Paulo, SP.

Cábulas, Instituto Figueiredo Ferraz, Ribeirão Preto, SP.

2016 VRIDO, Galeria Millan, São Paulo, SP

== Selected collective exhibitions ==
1971 V Jovem Arte Contemporânea – JAC, Museu de Arte Contemporânea, São Paulo, SP.

1973 V Panorama da Arte Atual Brasileira, Pintura, Museu de Arte Moderna, São Paulo, SP.

1979 O Desenho como Instrumento, Cooperativa dos Artistas Plásticos de São Paulo, Pinacoteca do Estado, São Paulo, SP.

1982 Entre a Mancha e a Figura, Museu de Arte Moderna do Rio de Janeiro, RJ.

1985 Inauguração, Galeria Subdistrito, São Paulo, SP.

1987 A Trama do Gosto: um olhar sobre o cotidiano, Fundação Bienal de São Paulo, SP.

XIX Bienal Internacional de São Paulo, Fundação Bienal de São Paulo, SP.

1988 Brasil Já – Beispiele zeitgenössischer brasilianischer Malerei, Leverkusen, Sttutgart e Hannover, Alemanha.

1990 Brazil Projects '90, Los Angeles, EUA, e Museu de Arte de São Paulo, SP.

1991 O que faz você agora Geração 60?, Museu de Arte Contemporânea da Universidade de São Paulo, SP.

1992 Branco Dominante, Galeria São Paulo, SP.

1994 Bienal Brasil Século XX, Fundação Bienal de São Paulo, SP.

XXII Bienal Internacional de São Paulo, Fundação Bienal de São Paulo, SP.

1995 Johannesburg Biennale, Johannesburgo, África do Sul.

2000 Mostra do Redescobrimento: Brasil 500 anos – Arte Contemporânea, Pavilhão da Bienal, São Paulo, SP.

Marcas do Corpo, Dobras da Alma – XII Mostra da Gravura de Curitiba, Fundação Cultural de Curitiba, Curitiba, PR.

2003 Tomie Ohtake na Trama Espiritual da Arte Brasileira, Instituto Tomie Ohtake, São Paulo, SP.

2005 A Persistência da Pintura, Histórias da Arte e do Espaço, V Bienal do Mercosul, Porto Alegre, RS.

2012 O Triunfo do Contemporâneo, Museu de Arte do Rio Grande do Sul Ado Malagoli (MARGS), Porto Alegre, RS.

Cromomuseu: Pós-Pictorialismo no Contexto Museológico, Museu de Arte do Rio Grande do Sul Ado Malagoli (MARGS), Porto Alegre, RS.

3M, 3D – Maia Rosa, Michalany, Miguez, 3 décadas, Coleção Particular, São Paulo, SP, de 11 de dezembro.

2013 As tramas do tempo na arte contemporânea: estética ou poética?, Instituto Figueiredo Ferraz, Ribeirão Preto, SP.

Pintura brasileira, Museu de Arte do Rio Grande do Sul Ado Malagoli (MARGS), Porto Alegre, RS.

O cânone pobre, Museu de Arte do Rio Grande do Sul Ado Malagoli (MARGS), Porto Alegre, RS.

2014 Deus e sua obra no sul da América – A experiência dos direitos humanos através dos sentidos, Museu dos Direitos Humanos do Mercosul, Porto Alegre, RS.

Distrações da memória – O museu como modo de rever o mundo, Museu de Arte do Rio Grande do Sul Ado Malagoli (MARGS), Porto Alegre, RS.

2015 X Bienal do Mercosul – Mensagens de uma nova América, Porto Alegre, RS.

Jogando com Ben Patterson, Bolsa de Arte, São Paulo, SP.

== Selected bibliography ==
FUNDAÇÃO BIENAL DE SÃO PAULO. Dudi Maia Rosa, Marcos Coelho Benjamim, Adriana Varejão. São Paulo: Fundação Bienal, 1995. 28 p.

BARROS, Stella Teixeira de. Entre a emoção e a razão: o insondável. In: VALU ORIA GALERIA DE ARTE. Dudi Maia Rosa: catálogo. São Paulo, 1997. p. 8–10.

COSTA, Oswaldo Corrêa da. Dudi Maia Rosa e as mortes da pintura = Dudi Maia Rosa and the deaths of painting. São Paulo: Metalivros, 2005. 190p.

DUARTE, Paulo Sérgio. As aparências não enganam = Appearances are not deceiving. In: GALERIA MILLAN. Dudi Maia Rosa: plásticos, São Paulo, 2009. p. 3–8.

FARIAS, Agnaldo. A pintura como corpo = Painting as body. In: GALERIA MILLAN. Dudi Maia Rosa: 22a. Bienal Internacional de São Paulo. São Paulo: Marca D’Água, 1994.

FIDELIS, Gaudêncio. A pintura pelo avesso. In: DUARTE, Paulo Sérgio (org.). A persistência da pintura. Porto Alegre: Fundação Bienal do Mercosul, 2005. p. 84.

FIDELIS, Gaudêncio. O Ciclo Arte Brasileira Contemporânea. In: INSTITUTO ESTADUAL DE ARTES VISUAIS (PORTO ALEGRE). Projeto Ciclo Arte Contemporânea: Dudi Maia Rosa: pintura: catálogo. Porto Alegre, 1993.

FREITAS, Thierry; RIVETTI, Lara. O trabalho da arte: Dudi Maia Rosa. Celeuma, n. 1, p. 12, 2013.

GAZIRE, Nina. Morre o controvertido, irreverente e pioneiro Wesley Duke Lee. IstoÉ Online, São Paulo, 13 set. 2010.

INSTITUTO TOMIE OHTAKE. Tomie Ohtake na trama espiritual da arte brasileira: exposição comemorativa dos 90 anos da artista. São Paulo: Instituto Tomie Ohtake, 2003. p. 35.

LAGNADO, Lisette. A expressão de Dudi Maia Rosa. Casa Vogue, São Paulo, v. 11, n. 1, p. 126–131, jan./fev. 1987.

LEIRNER, Sheila. Não sobre o 'eu', mas sobre arte. O Estado de S. Paulo, 21 out. 1982. p. 22.

MAMMI, Lorenzo. Questões da pintura. Guia das artes, São Paulo, v. 10, n. 38, edição especial, p. 24–29, 1995.

MORAIS, Frederico. Como Jonas, no ventre da pintura. Módulo, Rio de Janeiro, n. 79, p. 22–25, 1984.

MORAIS, Frederico. Dudi Maia Rosa, a criação de pontes através da arte. O Globo, 26 abr. 1984. p. 31.

Os artistas e a crítica: Dudi Maia Rosa [video]. Celeuma, n. 2, 2013.

PLAZA, Júlio. Entre (a pintura e seus) parênteses. Folha de S.Paulo, 24 out. 1982. Folhetim, n. 301, p. 10–11.

REZENDE, Marcelo. A origem do crime. In: CENTRO CULTURAL SÃO PAULO. Dudi Maia Rosa: folheto. São Paulo, 2004.

REZENDE, Marcelo. Seio postiço, saco de lixo, teclado de computador e... quadros. Bravo!, São Paulo, v. 11, n. 127, p. 68, mar. 2008.

RICCIOPPO, Carlos Eduardo. Dudi Maia Rosa: cábulas. 2013.

RODRIGUES, Carlito (coord.). Prêmio de Artes Plásticas Marcantonio Vilaça, 2013. Rio de Janeiro: FUNARTE, 2013. p. 150–159.

ROSA, Rafael Vogt Maia. A moldura do sujeito = The frame of the subject. In: GALERIA BRITO CIMINO. Dudi Maia Rosa: pinturas: catálogo. São Paulo, 2001.

ROSA, Rafael Vogt Maia. Cábulas. In: INSTITUTO FIGUEIREDO FERRAZ. Cábulas: folheto. Ribeirão Preto, 2013.

ROSA, Rafael Vogt Maia. Estação das linhas. In: MUSEU VICTOR MEIRELLES. Dudi Maia Rosa: gravuras: folheto. Florianópolis, 2001.

ROSA, Rafael Vogt Maia. Na matéria, o Santo Sepulcro. In: INSTITUTO ESTADUAL DE ARTES VISUAIS (PORTO ALEGRE). Dudi Maia Rosa: pinturas: folheto. Porto Alegre, 1993.

ROSA, Rafael Vogt Maia. Poema. In: GALERIA MILLAN. Dudi Maia Rosa: 22a. Bienal Internacional de São Paulo. São Paulo: Marca D’Água, 1994.

ROSA, Rafael Vogt Maia. Um verbo para a carne. In: VALU ORIA GALERIA DE ARTE. Dudi Maia Rosa: catálogo. São Paulo, 1997. p. 4–5.

VIEIRA FILHO, Renato. Dudi Maia Rosa. Arte em São Paulo, São Paulo, n. 21, p. 28–32, mar. 1984.
