= Mário Quintana =

Brazilian writer and translator

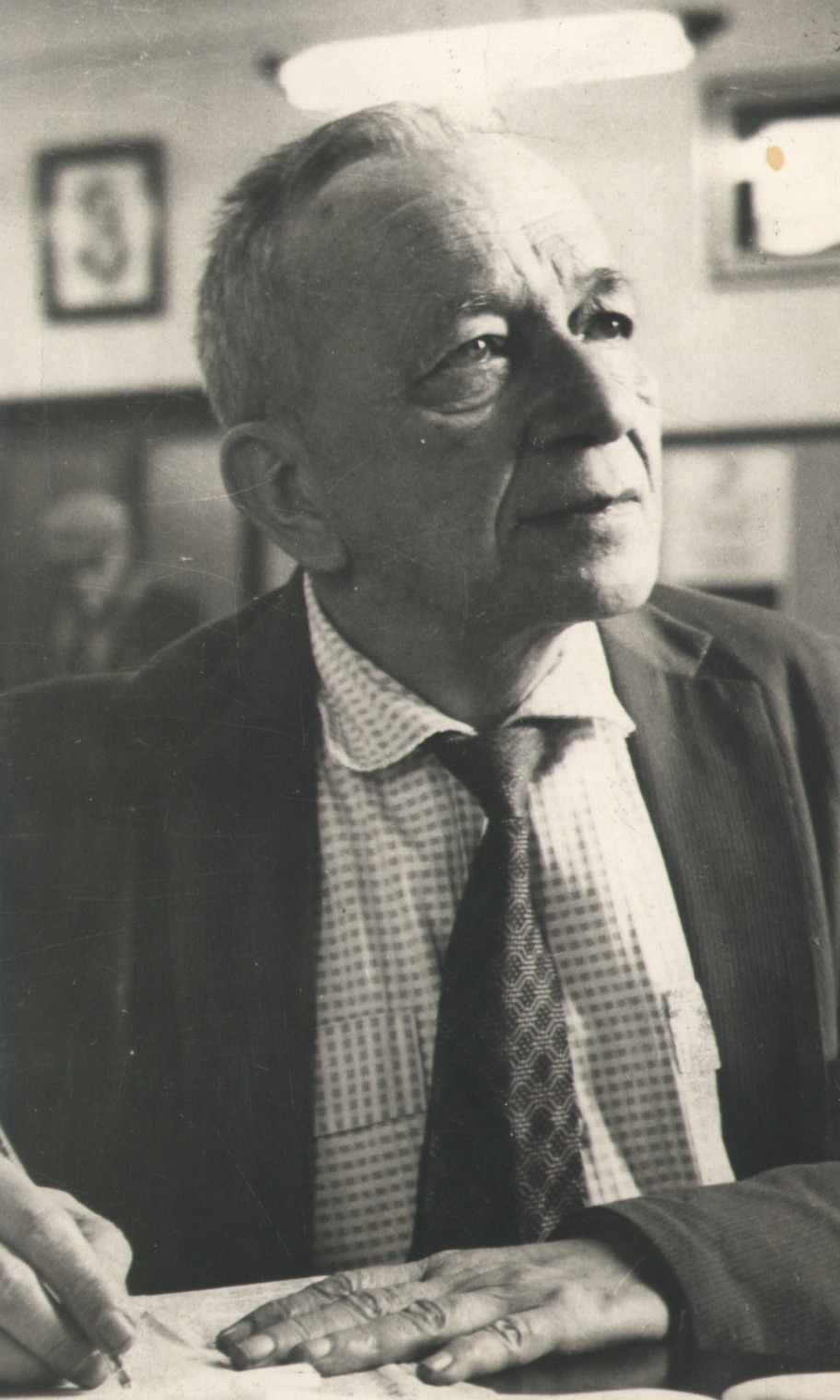
- Mário Quintana in 1966.
- Born: July 30, 1906; Alegrete, Brazil
- Died: May 5, 1994 (aged 87); Porto Alegre, Brazil
- Occupations: Writer, poet, translator
- Years active: 1940 — 1994

Mário de Miranda Quintana (July 30, 1906 – May 5, 1994) was a Brazilian writer and translator.

He became known as the poet of "simple things", and his style is marked by irony, profundity and technical perfection. The main themes of his poetry include death, the lost childhood and time. Quintana also worked as a journalist and translated into Portuguese innumerable books, such as Mrs. Dalloway by Virginia Woolf.

== Biography ==
The son of Celso de Oliveira Quintana de Miranda and Virginia, Mário Quintana was born in Alegrete, where he received his early education. He moved to Porto Alegre in 1919 to study at the Military School, and there he published his first works. He started working for Editora Globo, while it was still a state-owned publishing house.

Considered the "poet of simple things" with a style marked by irony, depth, and technical perfection, he worked as a journalist for most of his life. He translated over one hundred and thirty books of world literature, including in Search of Lost Time by Marcel Proust, Virginia Woolf's Mrs. Dalloway, and Words and Blood, by Giovanni Papini.

In 1940, he released his first book of poetry, A Rua dos Cataventos (The Pinwheels Street), beginning his career as a poet, writer and children's author. In 1953, Quintana worked at the newspaper Correio do Povo as a columnist of a subsection on culture, which was published every Saturday, and left the newspaper in 1977. In 1966, to commemorate his sixty years of age, he published "Poetics Anthology", with sixty poems, organized by Rubem Braga and Paulo Mendes Campos, and for this reason the poet was acclaimed by the Brazilian Academy of Letters by Meyer and Manuel Augusto Bandeira, who recited his own poem "Quintanares", in honor of his fellow gaucho. In the same year he won the Brazilian Union of Writers' Fernando Chinaglia Prize for best book of the year. In 1976, after turning seventy years old, Quintana was awarded from the state of Rio Grande do Sul government the Medal Negrinho do Pastoreio. In 1980, for his body of work, Quintana was awarded the Machado de Assis prize from the Brazilian Academy of Letters.

Mario Quintana never married nor had children. Solitary, he lived most of his life in hotels: from 1968 to 1980 he resided at the Hotel Majestic (currently the Mario Quintana House of Culture) in the historic center of Porto Alegre. Recently a fictional story originally written by Roberto Vieira in 2012 was revived on social media. The story claimed that in 1980 football star Paulo Roberto Falcão rescued Qunitana from a dire financial situation when Quintana was supposedly evicted from the Hotel Majestic when financial problems, due to the temporary closing of Correio do Povo, left him without pay. In reality, Falcão was moved to invite Quintana to stay at the Hotel Royal (owned by Falcão) when he heard that Quintano had undergone surgery; at that time Quintana was staying at the Hotel Presidente and was not suffering financial hardship.

The poet tried three times for a chair at the Brazilian Academy of Letters, but in none of the occasions he was elected, falling short of twenty votes required to qualify. Even with the promise of unanimous approval, the poet refused to apply a fourth time. He died in Porto Alegre on May 5, 1994, at the age of 87, four days after the death of Ayrton Senna.

== Works ==
- A Rua dos Cataventos, 1940
- Canções, 1946
- Sapato Florido, 1948
- O Aprendiz de Feiticeiro, 1950
- Espelho Mágico, 1951
- Inéditos e Esparsos, 1953
- Poesias, 1962
- Caderno H, 1973
- Apontamentos de História Sobrenatural, 1976
- Quintanares, 1976
- A Vaca e o Hipogrifo, 1977
- Esconderijos do Tempo, 1980
- Baú de Espantos, 1986
- Preparativos de Viagem, 1987
- Da Preguiça como Método de Trabalho, 1987
- Porta Giratória, 1988
- A Cor do Invisível, 1989
- Velório Sem Defunto, 1990
- Água, 2001
