= Afro-Brazilian culture =

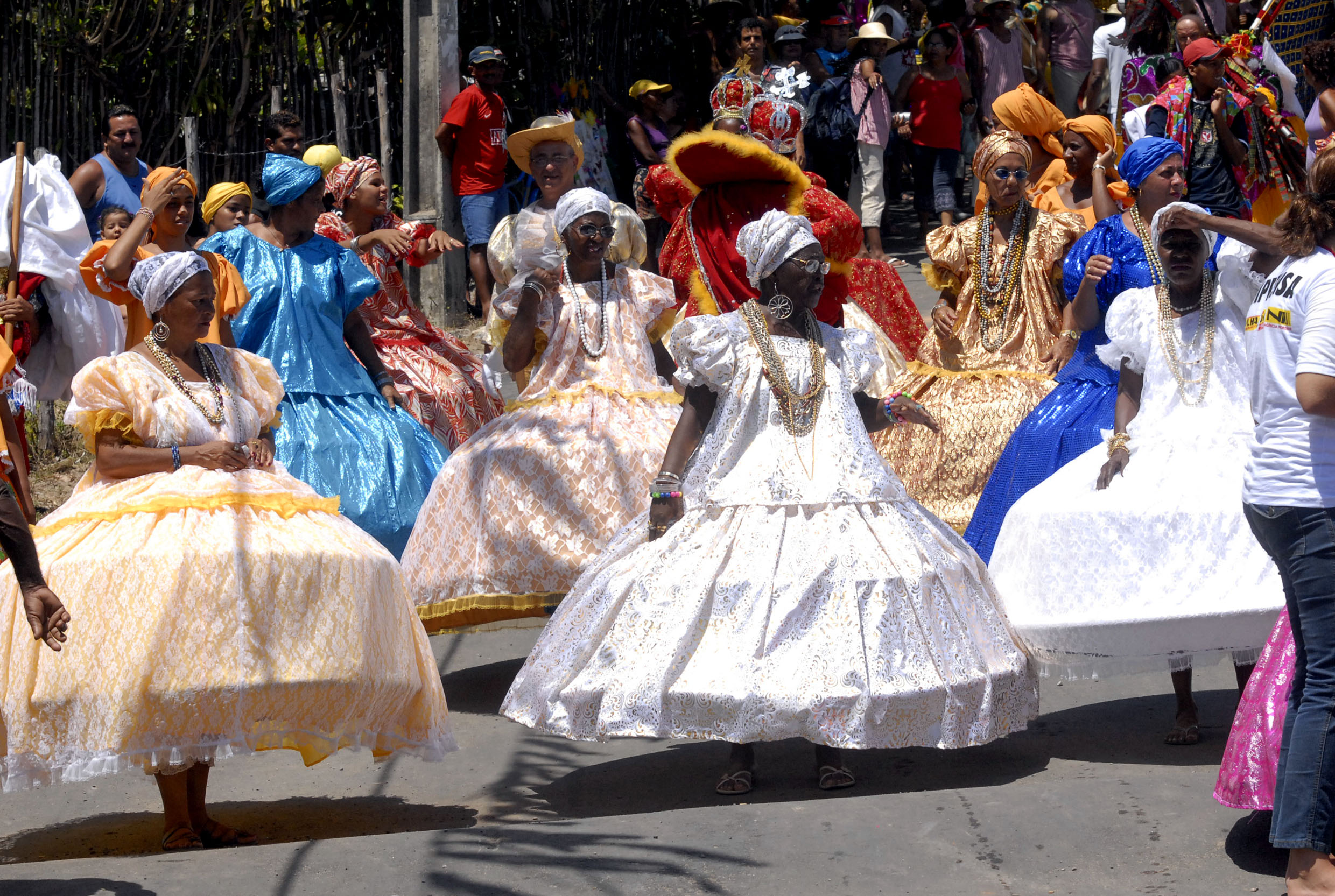
In Pernambuco, the first Afro-Brazilian folklore and rhythm emerged: congada and maracatu. In the photo, Maracatu Nação procession in Recife.

Afro-Brazilian culture is the combination of cultural manifestations in Brazil that have some influence from African culture since colonial times until the present day. Most of Africa's culture reached Brazil through the transatlantic slave trade, where it was also influenced by European and indigenous cultures, which means that characteristics of African origin in Brazilian culture are generally mixed with other cultural references.

Currently, strong aspects of African culture can be identified in many aspects of Brazilian society, such as popular music, religion, cuisine, folklore and popular festivities. The states of Maranhão, Pernambuco, Alagoas, Bahia, Minas Gerais, Espírito Santo, Rio de Janeiro, São Paulo and Rio Grande do Sul were the most influenced by the culture of African origin due to the number of slaves received during the slave trade and their internal migration after the end of the sugar cane cycle in the Northeast region.

Although traditionally depreciated in the colonial era and in the 19th century, aspects of Brazilian culture of African origin underwent a process of revalorization from the 20th century onwards that still exists today.

== Historical developments ==
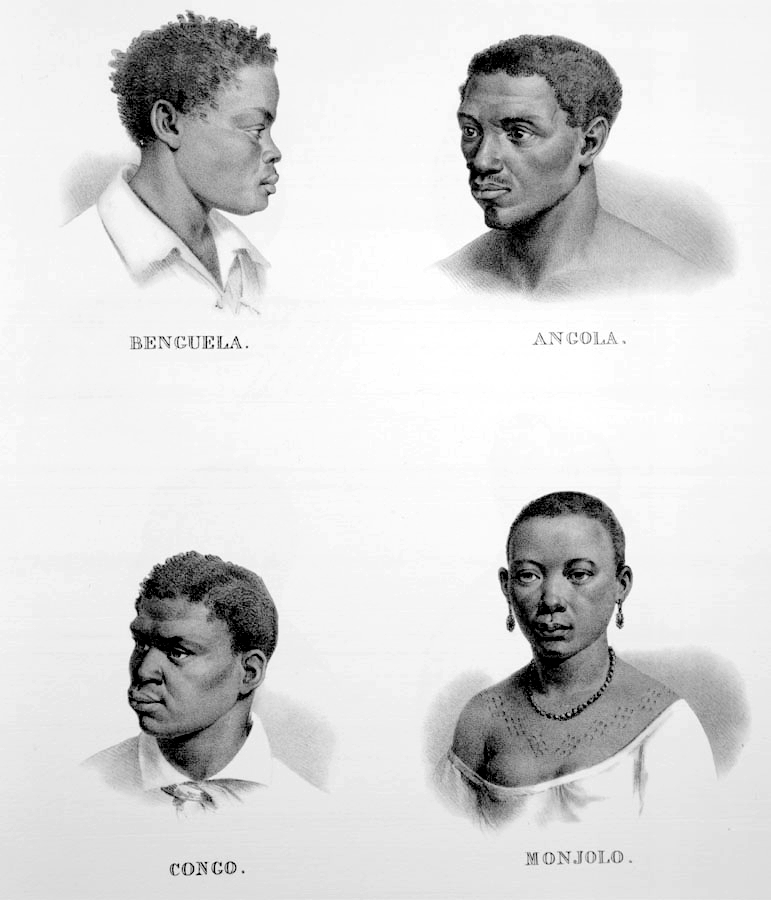
African slaves in Brazil from several nations (Rugendas, c. 1830).

Overall, both in colonial times and in the 19th century, the cultural identity of European origin was the most valued in Brazil, while Afro-Brazilian cultural manifestations were often neglected, discouraged and even prohibited. Afro-Brazilian religions and the martial art of capoeira were often suppressed by the authorities. On the other hand, some folkloric manifestations, such as congadas and maracatu, as well as musical expressions like lundu, were tolerated and even stimulated.

From the mid-20th century onwards, Afro-Brazilian cultural expressions gradually began to be more accepted and admired by Brazilian elites as authentic national artistic expressions. However, not all cultural manifestations were accepted at the same time. Samba was one of the first expressions of Afro-Brazilian culture to be admired when it assumed a privileged position in popular music at the beginning of the 20th century.

Subsequently, the government of the Estado Novo dictatorship of Getúlio Vargas implemented policies to stimulate nationalism where Afro-Brazilian culture could be officially accepted. It was during this period that samba school parades gained government approval through the General Union of Samba Schools of Brazil, founded in 1934.

The same happened to other cultural expressions. Capoeira, which was considered an activity of criminals and outlaws, was presented in 1953 by Mestre Bimba to president Vargas, who called it "the only truly national sport".

From the 1950s onwards, persecution of Afro-Brazilian religions decreased and umbanda was accepted by part of the Rio de Janeiro middle class. In the following decade, Afro-Brazilian religions began to be celebrated by the white intellectual elite.

In 2003, Law No. 10.639 was signed, which modified the Law of Guidelines and Bases of Education (LDB), requiring Brazilian primary and secondary schools to include the teaching of Afro-Brazilian history and culture in the curriculum.

== Afro-Brazilian studies ==
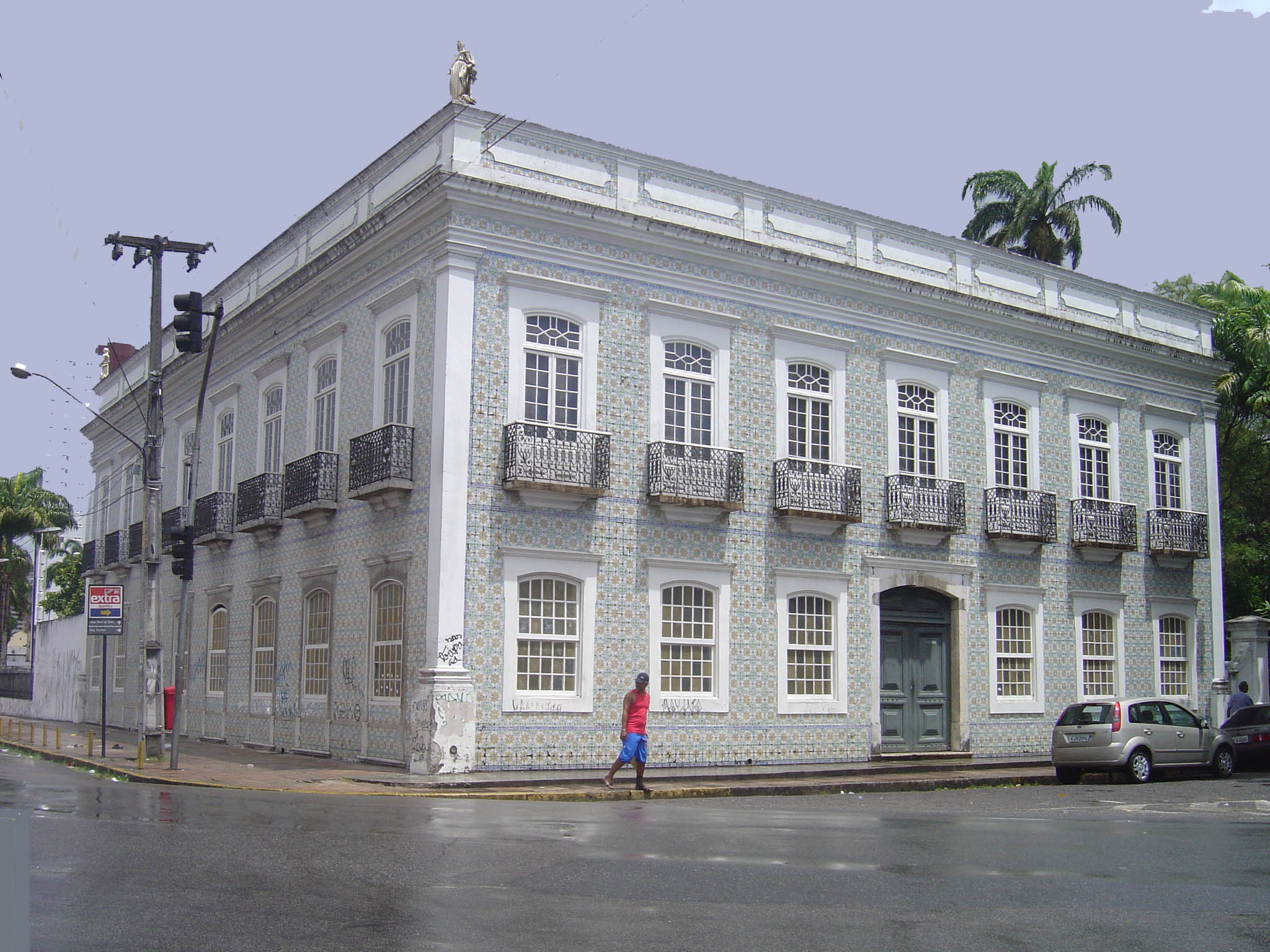
Abolition Museum - Reference Center of Afro-Brazilian Culture, in Recife.

The interest in Afro-Brazilian culture is expressed by the many studies in the fields of sociology, anthropology, ethnology, music and linguistics, among others, focused on the expression and historical evolution of Afro-Brazilian culture.

Many Brazilian scholars, such as the lawyer Edison Carneiro, the coroner Nina Rodrigues, the writer Jorge Amado, the poet and writer from Minas Gerais Antonio Olinto, the writer and journalist João Ubaldo, the anthropologist and museologist Raul Lody, as well as foreigners like the French sociologist Roger Bastide, the photographer Pierre Verger, the American ethnologist researcher Ruth Landes, and the Argentine painter Carybé, dedicated themselves to collecting data on Afro-Brazilian culture, which had not yet been studied in detail.

Some of them became involved in Afro-Brazilian religions, as is the case of João do Rio; others were invited to join candomblé as full members, receiving honorary positions as Obá de Xangô at Ilê Axé Opô Afonjá and Ogã at Ilê Axé Iyá Nassô Oká and Ilê Axé Iyá Omin Iyamassê, helping financially to maintain these terreiros.

Many lay priests in literature volunteered to write the history of Afro-Brazilian religions with the help of sympathetic academics or members of candomblés. Others, since they already had an academic background, became writers in parallel with their position as priests, like anthropologists Júlio Santana Braga and Vivaldo da Costa Lima, the iyalorishás Mãe Stella and Giselle Cossard Binon - Omindarewa, professor Agenor Miranda, lawyer Cléo Martins and sociology professor Reginaldo Prandi, among others.

== Religion ==
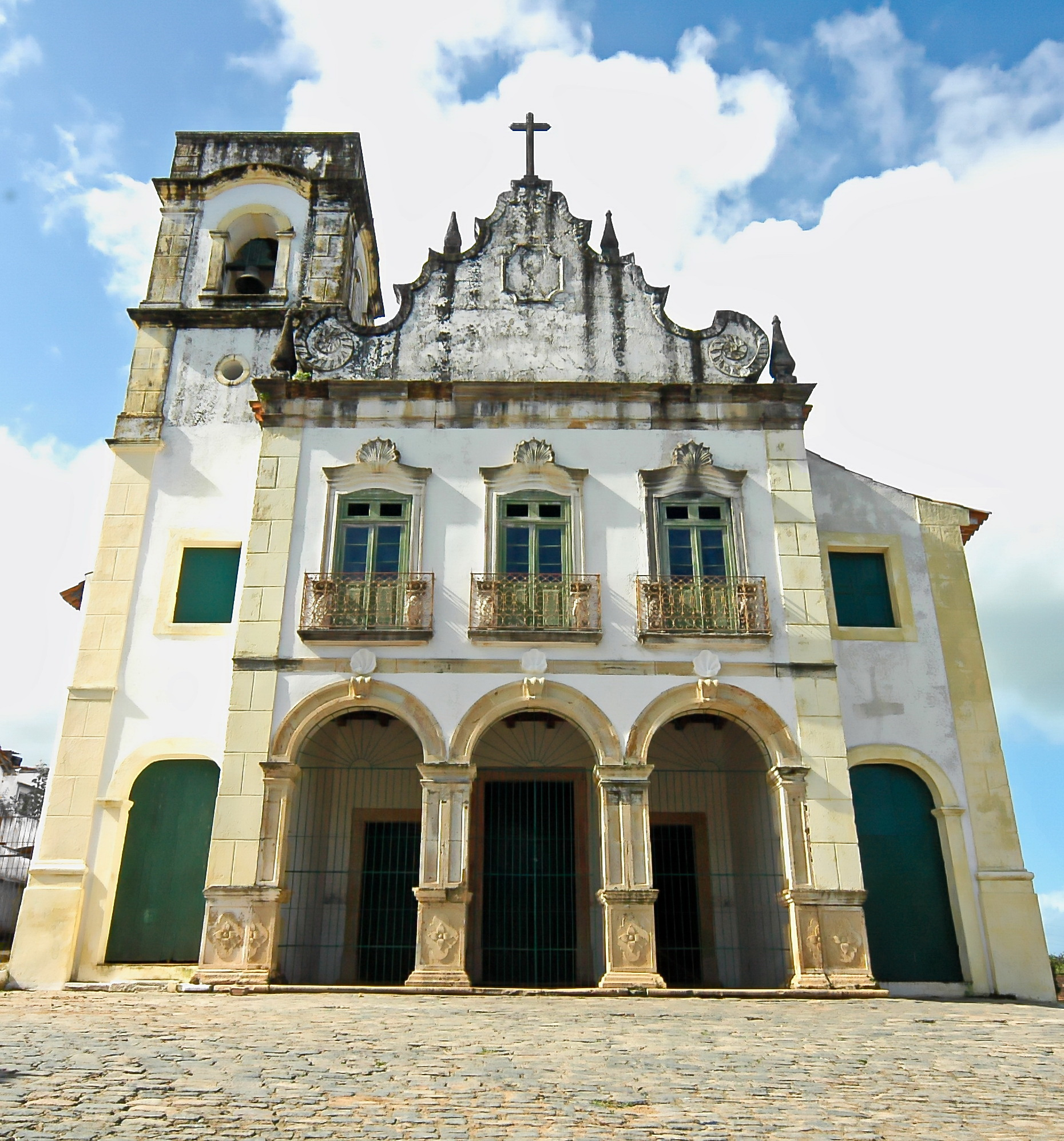
The Church of Our Lady of the Rosary of the Black Men of Olinda was the first church in Brazil owned by a brotherhood of blacks.

Overall, blacks brought from Africa as slaves were immediately baptized and forced to follow Catholicism. However, conversion was only superficial and religions of African origin managed to remain through secret practice or syncretism with Catholicism. Some Afro-Brazilian religions still maintain most of their African traditions, such as the traditional candomblé and xangô in the northeast region; others were formed through religious syncretism, such as batuque, tambor de mina, xambá and umbanda.

Regardless, Afro-Brazilian religions show influences from Catholicism and indigenous encantaria and pajelança. Syncretism also manifests itself in the tradition of baptism of children and marriage in the Catholic Church, even when the members openly follow an Afro-Brazilian religion.

In colonial Brazil, blacks and mulattos, whether slaves or freedmen, often associated themselves in Catholic religious brotherhoods. The Sisterhood of Our Lady of the Good Death and the Sisterhood of Our Lady of the Rosary of the Black Men were among the most important, also serving as a link between Catholicism and Afro-Brazilian religions. The very practice of traditional Catholicism suffered African influence in the cult of saints of African origin such as Saint Benedict, Saint Elesbaan, Saint Ephigenia and Saint Anthony of Noto (Saint Anthony of Carthage or Saint Anthony Ethiopian); in the preferential cult of saints easily associated with African orishas such as Saints Cosmas and Damian (ibeji), Saint George (Ogun in Rio de Janeiro), Saint Barbara (Yansã); in the creation of new popular saints such as the Escrava Anastacia; and in litanies, prayers (such as the Trezena of Saint Anthony) and religious festivals (such as the Lavagem do Bonfim where the steps of the Church of Our Lord of Bonfim in Salvador, Bahia are washed with scented water by daughters of the saints of candomblé ).

While Catholicism denies the existence of orishas, Pentecostal churches believe in their existence, but as demons. According to the IBGE, 0.3% of Brazilians say they follow religions of African origin, although a larger number of people pursue these religions privately.

Initially neglected, Afro-Brazilian religions were or are openly practiced by several important intellectuals and artists such as Jorge Amado, Dorival Caymmi, Vinícius de Moraes, Caetano Veloso, Gilberto Gil, Maria Bethânia (who attended Mãe Menininha's terreiro), Gal Costa (who was initiated to the Orisha Babalú-Ayé), Mestre Didi (son of the iyalorishá Mãe Senhora), Antonio Risério, Caribé (artist), Fernando Coelho, Gilberto Freyre and José Beniste (who was initiated in the Ketu branch).

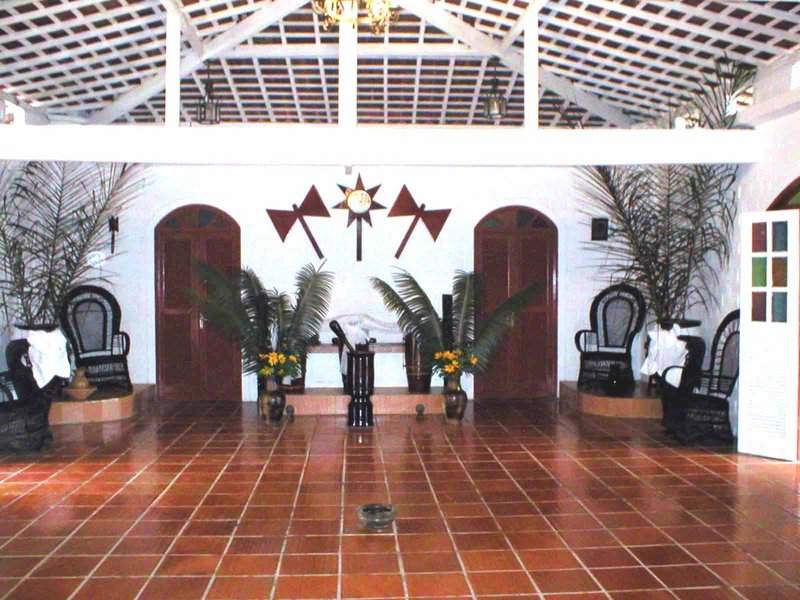
Candomblé shed in Pernambuco.

=== Afro-Brazilian religions ===
- Babaçuê - Pará;
- Batuque - Rio Grande do Sul;
- Cabula - Espírito Santo, Minas Gerais, Rio de Janeiro and Santa Catarina;
- Candomblé - In all states of Brazil;
- Egungun cult - Bahia, Rio de Janeiro and São Paulo;
- Ifá Cult - Bahia, Rio de Janeiro and São Paulo;
- Macumba - Rio de Janeiro;
- Omoloko - Rio de Janeiro, Minas Gerais and São Paulo;
- Kimbanda - Rio de Janeiro and São Paulo;
- Tambor de Mina - Maranhão and Pará;
- Terecô - Maranhão;
- Umbanda - In all states of Brazil;
- Xambá - Alagoas and Pernambuco;
- Xangô do Nordeste - Paraíba, Pernambuco, Alagoas and Sergipe;
- Confraternities;
- Sisterhood of Our Lady of the Good Death;
- Sisterhood of Our Lady of the Rosary of the Black Men;
- Syncretism;

== Art ==
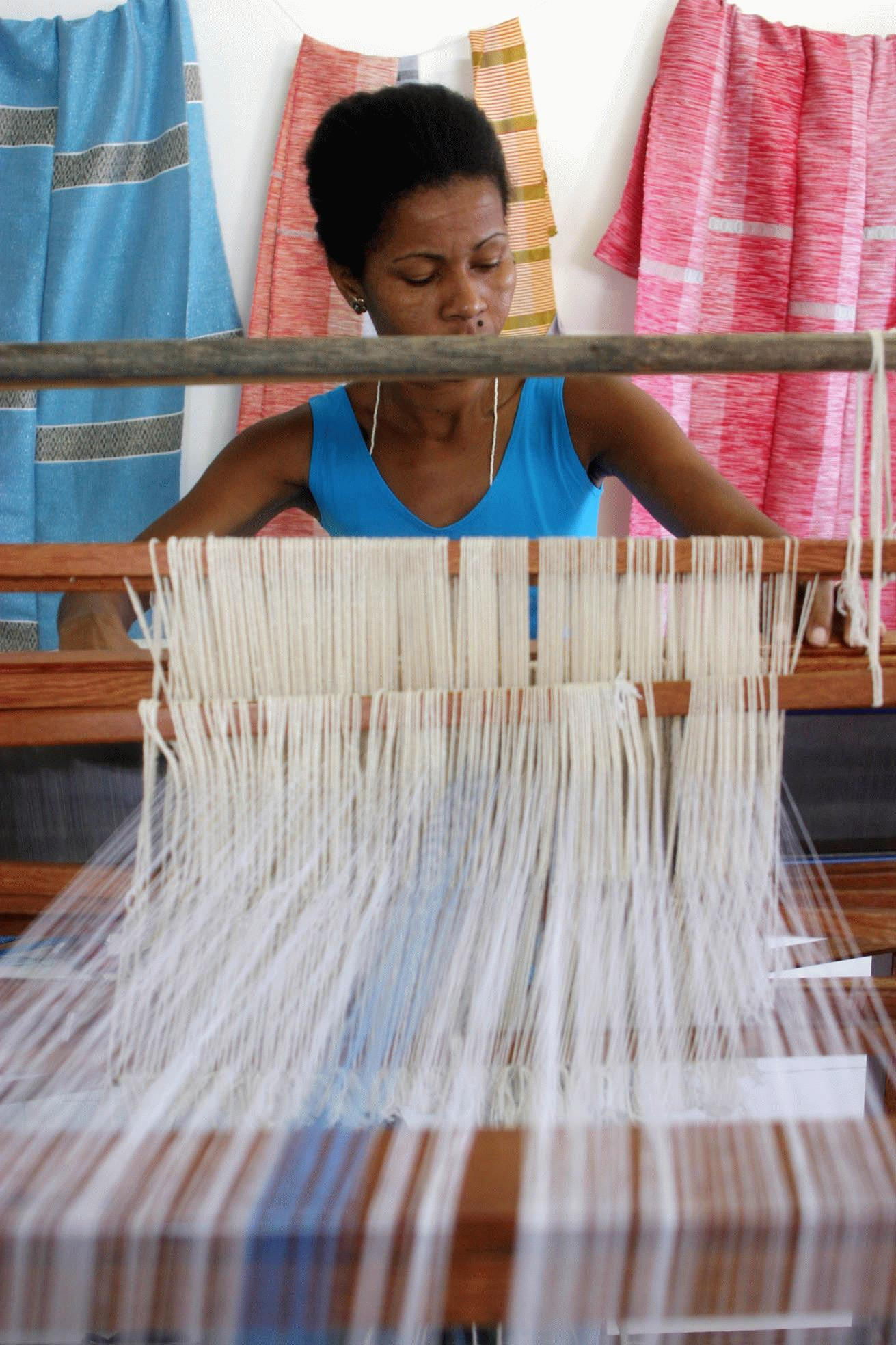
Weaver of the Ilê Axé Opô Afonjá candomblé terreiro in Salvador, Bahia, Brazil.

The African Alaká, known in Brazil as pano-da-costa, is produced by weavers of the Ilê Axé Opô Afonjá candomblé terreiro in Salvador, in the space called Casa do Alaká. Mestre Didi, Alapini (high priest) of the Egungun cult and Açobá (supreme priest) of the cult of Babalú-Ayé and Orishas of the earth, is also a sculptor and his work is entirely focused on Yoruba mythology and art.

In painting, many artists and designers have dedicated themselves to showing the beauty of candomblé, umbanda and batuque on their canvases. One of them is the Argentine sculptor and painter Carybé, who dedicated much of his life in Brazil sculpting and painting the Orishas and festivals down to the finest detail. His sculptures can be seen in the Afro-Brazilian Museum and part of his work has been published in books.

In photography, the Frenchman Pierre Fatumbi Verger, who visited Bahia in 1946 and remained until the last day of his life, portrayed in black and white the Brazilian people and all the nuances of candomblé. Besides photographing, he became part of the religion, both in Brazil and in Africa, where he was initiated as a babalawo, as well as starting the Pierre Verger Foundation in Salvador, where his entire photographic collection is located.

== Cuisine ==
Brazilian feijoada, considered the national dish of Brazil, is frequently mentioned as a creation of the slaves, since it may have been invented in the senzalas. Nowadays, however, Brazilian feijoada is considered a tropical adaptation of the Portuguese feijoada that was not usually served to slaves. Despite this, regional Brazilian cuisine was greatly influenced by African cooking, mixed with European and indigenous culinary elements.

The cuisine of Bahia is the one that most demonstrates the African influence in its typical dishes such as acarajé, caruru, vatapá and moqueca. These dishes are prepared with palm oil, extracted from an African palm tree brought to Brazil in colonial times. In Bahia, there are two ways to prepare these recipes. In a simpler way, the foods do not contain much seasoning and are made in the candomblé terreiros to be offered to the orishas. In the other way, applied outside the terreiros, the foods are prepared with a lot of seasoning and are more flavorful, being sold by the baianas do acarajé and tasted in restaurants and homes.

== Music ==
The music created by Afro-Brazilians is a combination of influences from across sub-Saharan Africa with elements of Portuguese and, to a lesser extent, indigenous music, which has produced a wide variety of styles. Brazilian popular music is strongly influenced by African rhythms; the most popular genres are samba, marabaixo, maracatu, ijexá, coco, jongo, carimbó, lambada, maxixe, maculelê.

Just as happened in all the regions of America where African slaves were present, the music made by Afro-descendants was initially neglected and marginalized, until it gained notoriety in the early 20th century and became the most popular today.

=== Afro-Brazilian instruments ===
- Afoxé;
- Agogô;
- Alfaia;
- Atabaque;
- Berimbau;
- Drum;

== See also ==
- African culture in Rio Grande do Sul
- Quilombo
- Afro-Brazilian history
