= Mãe Carmen =

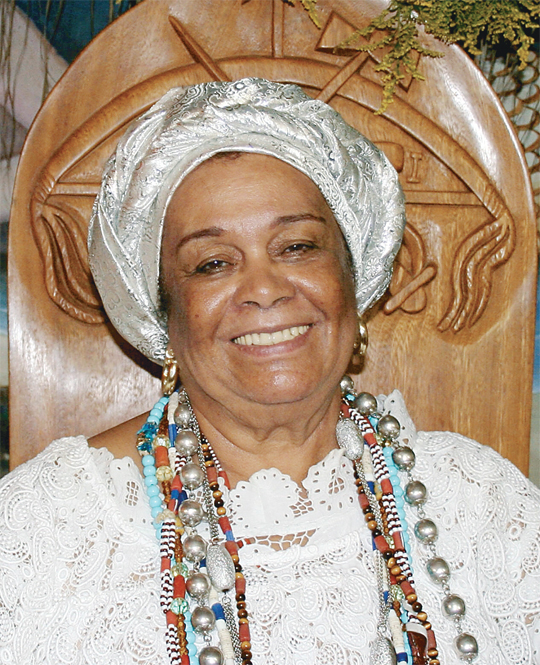
- Mãe Carmen in 2012
- Born: Carmen Oliveira da Silva; December 29, 1926; Salvador, Bahia, Brazil
- Died: December 26, 2025 (aged 98); Salvador, Bahia, Brazil
- Occupation: Mãe-de-santo
- Mother: Mãe Menininha do Gantois

Carmen Oliveira da Silva, known as Mãe Carmen do Gantois or Mãe Carmen de Oxalá (December 29, 1926 — December 26, 2025), was a Brazilian Candomblé ialorixá (priestess). The youngest daughter of Mãe Menininha do Gantois and sister of Mãe Cleusa de Nanã, she served as the ialorixá of the Ilê Axé Iyá Omin Iyamassê from 2002 until her death in 2025.

== Biography ==
Carmen Oliveira da Silva was born in 1926 in Salvador, Bahia, and was the daughter of Maria Escolástica da Conceição Nazaré, known as Mãe Menininha do Gantois, and the lawyer of British descent Álvaro MacDowell de Oliveira. She was the sister of Cleusa Millet, known as Mãe Cleusa de Nanã. A retired employee of the Bahia State Court of Accounts, she worked for several years as an accountant but was called upon to assume the throne of Gantois in 2002. She was initiated into Candomblé at the age of seven and spent much of her life as the ialaxé of Gantois.

During her years as the ialorixá of Terreiro do Gantois, she promoted socio-educational initiatives within the Gantois community. On the cultural front, she undertook efforts aimed at making the legacy of African-based religious memory in Bahia more accessible, offering courses in rhythms and drumming, dance, traditional embroidery, among other activities. In 2019, she was honored in an album by Grupo Ofá titled Obatalá – Uma Homenagem a Mãe Carmen.

Mãe Carmen passed away on December 26, 2025, at the Hospital Português in Salvador, where she had been hospitalized for two weeks due to a severe case of influenza. Her death was mourned by famous artists, such as Maria Bethânia and Regina Casé.
