= Altamira Cecília dos Santos =

Brazilian Candomblé priestess (1923–2019)

- Born: 1923; Salvador da Bahia, Brazil
- Died: 7 December 2019 (aged 95–96); Salvador da Bahia, Brazil
- Occupation: Candomblé priestess
- Known for: Mãe Tatá Oxum Tomilá of the Casa Branca do Engenho Velho temple

Altamira Cecília dos Santos (1923 – 2019), also known as Mãe Tatá Oxum Tomilá, was the eighth mãe-de-santo, ialorixá or high priestess of the Casa Branca do Engenho Velho temple of Candomblé Ketu, the largest and most influential branch of the Candomblé religion practiced in Brazil.

== Early life ==
Santos was born in 1923 in Salvador da Bahia, the daughter of Maria Deolinda dos Santos, popularly known as Papai Oquê. With the death of Marieta Vitória Cardoso, the so-called Mãe Niquê, she succeeded her in 1985 as the eighth ialorixá of the Casa Branca do Engenho Velho temple or terreiro in the Brotas neighbourhood of Salvador, the oldest Candomblé temple in the city. In this role, she was assisted by the Mãe-pequena (Little mother), Juliana da Silva Baraúna, and the Mãe Nitinha de Oxum, Areonite da Conceição Chagas.

Altamira is recognized as having been one of the greatest leaders of Candomblé in Bahia, being responsible for many reforms to her temple. In 1986, under her leadership, the terreiro, with an area of approximately 6,800 m^{2}, with buildings, trees and sacred objects, was the first example of a black monument to be recognized as a Historical Heritage of Brazil by the National Institute of Historic and Artistic Heritage (IPHAN).

== Death ==
In 2015 Altamira was diagnosed as having Alzheimer's disease, but she continued to lead the terreiro, fulfilling her religious obligations. She died on 7 December 2019, aged 96, at her home near the temple. She was buried in the municipal cemetery of Jardim da Saudade after a procession that passed through the streets of the neighbourhood in the company of a large crowd of hundreds of people all dressed in the traditional white for funerals. Due to her death the temple suspended its activities for a one-year period of mourning.
