= Ilê Axé Iyá Nassô Oká =

Historic Candomblé temple in Salvador, Bahia, Brazil

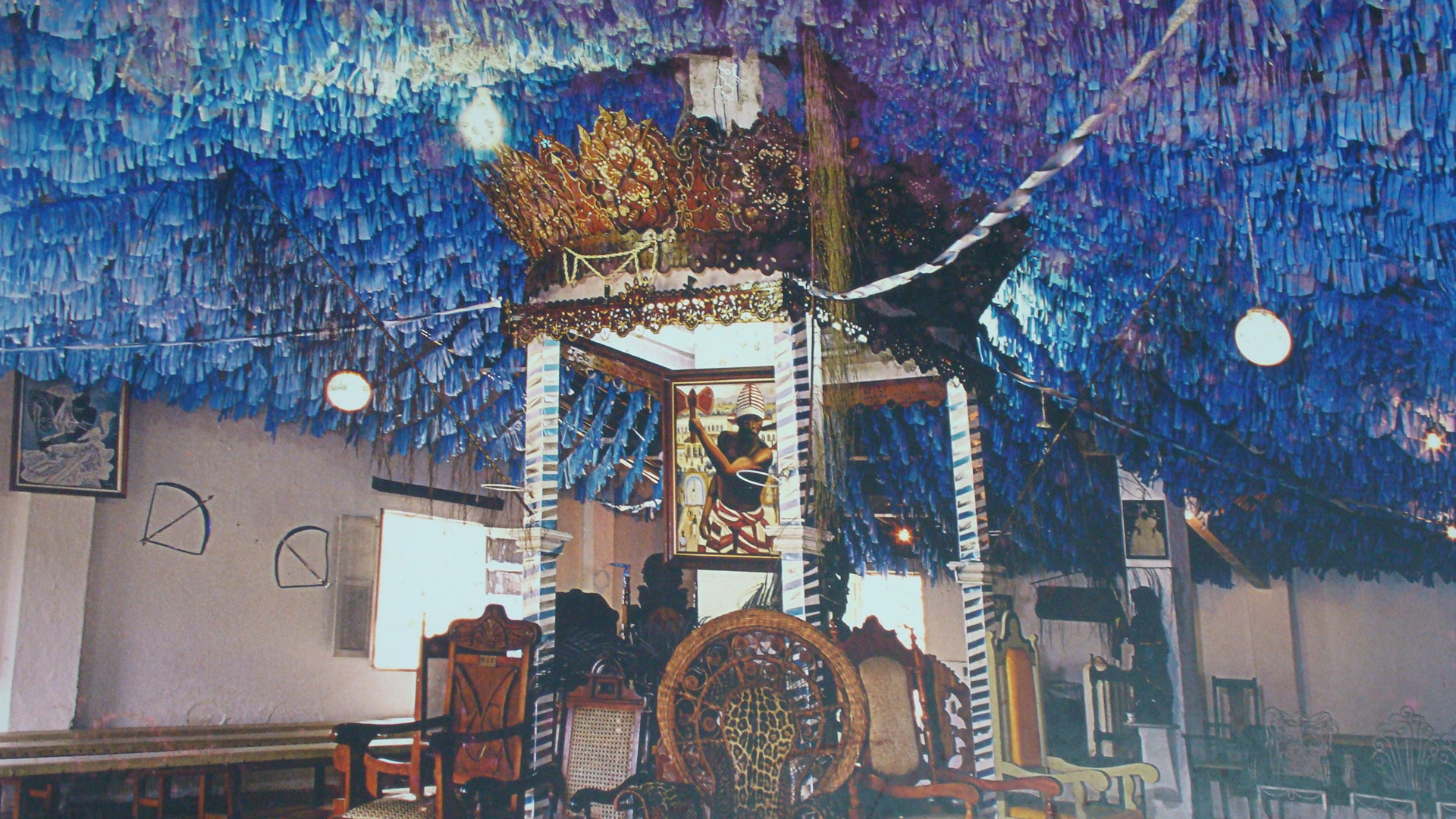
- Interior of Casa Branca of Ilé Axé Iya Nassô Oká

Religion
- Affiliation: Candomblé
- Sect: Ketu
- Deity: Oxossi, Xango

Location
- Municipality: Salvador
- State: Bahia
- Country: Brazil
- Interactive map of Ilê Axé Iyá Nassô Oká
- Coordinates: 12.997081°S 38.494881°W

National Historic Heritage of Brazil
- Designated: 1986
- Reference no.: 1067

Ilê Axé Iyá Nassô Oká is a historic Candomblé temple (or terreiro, in Portuguese) in the city of Salvador, Bahia, in northeastern Brazil. It is also known as the Casa Branca do Engenho Velho, or simply the Casa Branca. Located on a hill above Vasco da Gama, a busy avenue in the working-class neighborhood of Engenho Velho, the terreiro belongs to the Ketu branch of Candomblé, which is heavily influenced by the religious beliefs and practices of the Yoruba people. The earliest documents proving the temple's existence are from the late nineteenth century, but it was certainly founded much earlier, probably c. 1830. Since the 1940s, the religious community has been registered as a public entity under the name Sociedade Beneficente e Recreativa São Jorge do Engenho Velho.

Considered by many to be the oldest terreiro in Brazil, Ilê Axé Iyá Nassô Oká was the first Afro-Brazilian temple to receive heritage status from the National Institute of Historic and Artistic Heritage (IPHAN). The terreiro's grounds cover an area of 6,800 square metres (73,000 ft^{2}), including a number of buildings that house shrines, personal residences and/or communal areas for temple members. The lush vegetation includes numerous plants and trees that are sacred to the deities of Candomblé's pantheon.

== Early history ==
According to oral tradition, Ilê Axé Iyá Nassô Oká emerged from an earlier religious community that was located in the vicinity of the Barroquinha church, said to have been founded by three African freedwomen: Iyá Nassô, Iyá Akalá and Iyá Detá. At some point, probably around 1830, Iyá Nassô withdrew to form her own temple. Recently uncovered historical evidence shows that at its incept the new community operated out of a townhouse that she and her husband owned in the Pelourinho district, in the center of the city. A few years later, following a major slave uprising in 1835, in which her sons were accused of participating, Iyá Nassô along with her family and other members of her household, including several former captives, returned to Africa. Iyá Nassô remained there, but in 1839, one of the women who had accompanied her, Marcelina, went back to Bahia, where she assumed leadership of the religious community, a position she held until her death in 1885.

According to oral tradition, the temple moved several times before settling at its current location sometime in the second half of the nineteenth century. The property was leased from a larger estate outside of the city limits, known as Engenho Velho (Old Sugar Mill). This location gave rise to one of the temple's nicknames, Engenho Velho. However, Ilê Axé Iyá Nassô Oká was not the only Candomblé community to establish itself in the area. To this day there are several other historic temples within easy walking distance. Terreiro Ilê Aché Ibá Ogum and Zoogodô Bogum Malê Rundó, also known as the Terreiro do Bogum, are located in close proximity to Ilê Axé Iyá Nassô Oká.

Although today it lies within the city limits, in the nineteenth century it was a secluded location. This was important for Afro-Brazilian religious communities, serving to protect them from one of the major challenges they faced: police persecution. Despite its location deep within a thick forest, there were occasional police raids in the area, attested to by newspapers of the period.

At different points in the temple's history, internal dissent led to the foundation of new terreiros. Sometime in the 1850s, Ilê Axé Iyá Omin Iyamassê, also known as the Gantois, was established not far away in the Federação neighborhood. In 1910, Ilê Axé Opô Afonjá was founded in São Gonçalo, a rural area on the other side of town. Both grew into renowned temples in their own right and like Ilê Axé Iyá Nassô Oká itself are now recognized as national historic heritage sites.

== Succession of high priestesses ==
Throughout its history, Ilê Axé Iyá Nassô Oká has been led by women. Its high priestesses are known by the title mãe-de-santo or ialorixá, a Lusophone spelling of the Yoruba term ìyálórìṣà. The following list gives the names of the temple's leaders, beginning with the legendary founder, Iyá Nassô, the dates of their leadership and the specific orisha ("òrìṣà" in Yorùbá language or orixá, in Portuguese) to which they were consecrated.

- Iyá Nassô (c. 1830-1837, Xangô)
- Iyá Marcelina da Silva (c. 1845-1885, Xangô)
- Iyá Maria Júlia Figueiredo (c. 1886-1890, Oxum)
- Iyá Ursulina Maria de Figueiredo (c. 1892- c.1924, Oxum)
- Iyá Maximiana Maria da Conceição (1925-1962, Oxalá)
- Iyá Maria Deolinda Gomes dos Santos (1965-1968, Oxalá)
- Iyá Marieta Vitória Cardoso (c. 1970-1984, Oxum)
- Iyá Altamira Cecília dos Santos (1985-2019, Oxum)
- Iyá Neuza Conceição Cruz (2021–present, Xangô)

== Grounds and structures ==
The grounds of Ilê Axé Iyá Nassô Oká are dedicated to the orixá Oxóssi (from the Yoruba Ọ̀ṣọ́ọ̀sì, anglicized as Oshosi, but its main temple is dedicated to Xangô (from the Yoruba Ṣàngó, anglicized as Shango). There are a number of smaller buildings, some containing shrines, while others are used as residences by certain members of the community. There are also a number of external shrines amid the lush vegetation, which includes numerous plant species sacred to the orixás.

=== Oxum Plaza ===
Just inside the entrance to the temple grounds is a plaza dedicated to the divinity Oshun (Oxum in Portuguese, Ọ̀ṣun in Yorùbá language). A distinctive feature is a shrine to this deity that is encircled by low walls in the shape of boat, known as the barco de Oxum. After the temple was designated a historic heritage site, the plaza was renovated according to a plan by the celebrated Modernist architect Oscar Niemeyer (1907-2012), one of only two of his designs that exist in the city of Salvador.

=== Main temple ===
The main structure of the terreiro, known as a barracão, is an elongated building on the side of the hill overlooking the plaza. It contains a large hall for rituals involving large numbers of people, including public ceremonies, as well as numerous smaller rooms. There is a spacious kitchen for food preparation, including ritual foods offered to the orixás, and private rooms for the temple's leaders. A white flag at the entrance to the barracão indicates its sacred nature. Atop the tiled roof of the barracão are the ritual symbols of Xango, signalling his role as patron of the temple.

== Heritage status ==
In the early 1980s, urban expansion led to real estate speculation, threatening the very existence of Ilê Axé Iyá Nassô Oká. Part of the property that the temple had been leasing for a century was sold and a gas station was built on the land. With the prospect of what remained of the temple's grounds being put up for sale as well, the community rallied, sparking a grass-roots movement that won support from Afro-Brazilian cultural and community groups, residents of other parts of the city and politicians. Many public personalities, including the high priestess of the Gantois temple, Mãe Menininha, novelist Jorge Amado, artist Carybé, musician Dorival Caymmi, ethnologist and photographer Pierre Verger, and architect Oscar Niemeyer, lent their voices to advocating for the temple's preservation. As a result, in 1982 the city of Salvador took what was then an unprecedented step, conceding historic landmark status to the temple. This was followed in August 1986 by another, even greater precedent: historic heritage status from the National Institute of Historic and Artistic Heritage (IPHAN), which included not only the building where public ceremonies are held but "the entire site, an area of approximately 6,800 m2, with the buildings, trees and main sacred objects, accompanied by all necessary measures that effectively guarantee the safety of this property." This permitted the temple to regain control over the land where the gas station had been constructed and gave rise to the renovation project designed by Niemeyer, described above.

The community's designation as a national historic monument marked the first time that the historical and cultural value of a Candomblé temple had been recognized by the Brazilian government. It paved the way for the recognition of other important Afro-Brazilian sites of memory, at federal, state and local levels.

== See also ==
- Terreiro do Bate Folha
- Ilé Axé Asìpá
- Ilê Axé Iyá Omin Iyamassê
- Ilê Axé Opô Afonjá
- Ile Maroia Laji
