= Maria Júlia da Conceição Nazaré =

Brazilian Mãe-de-santo (died 1910)

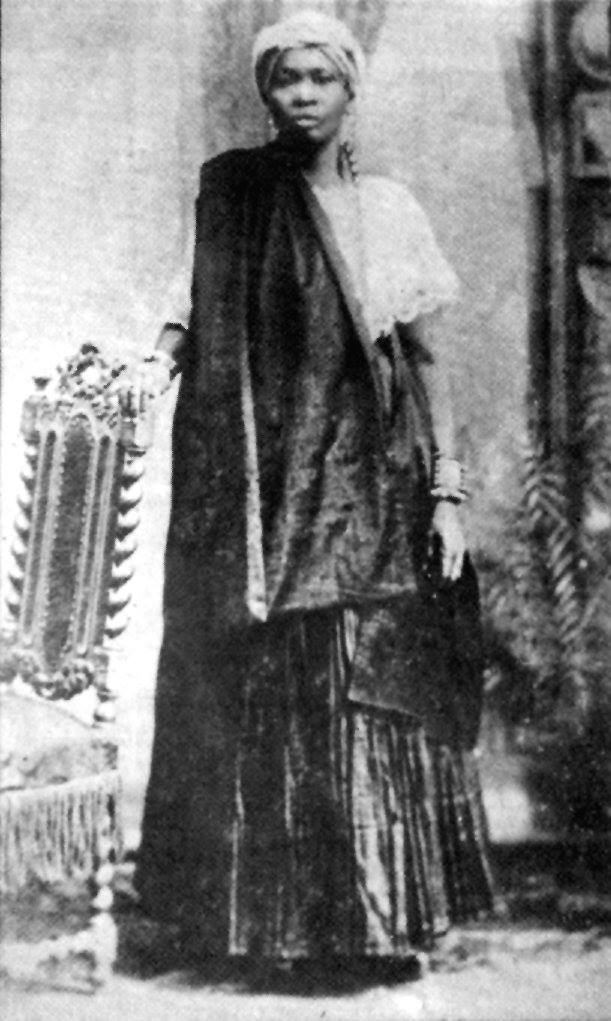

Maria Júlia da Conceição Nazaré, also known as Mãe Maria Julia, (Abeokuta, modern-day Nigeria circa 1800 - Salvador, Bahia, Brazil 1910) was a Candomblé spiritual leader (iyalorixá or mãe-de-santo) and founded Salvador's Ilê Axé Iyá Omin Iyamassê (Terreiro do Gantois) in 1849.

== Biography ==
Maria Júlia was born into an Egba family in Abeokuta in the early 1800s.

Maria Júlia married Francisco Nazaré (1789 – 1859), a Jeje man from Dahomey, with whom she had nine children. The couple lived in Salvador, and Mãe Maria Júlia was an iyalorixá in the Casa Branca do Engenho Velho, the first terreiro founded in Salvador.

In 1849, after a dispute over community leadership, Mãe Maria Júlia and a group of followers left the Casa Branca to form the terreiro Ilê Iyá Omin Axé Iyá Massê in Salvador's Federação neighborhood. The terreiro was better known as the Gantois after the name of its Belgian landowner, the slave trafficker Édouard Gantois. The new Gantois terreiro was consecrated to the god Xangô and placed under the protection of the Orisha Oxossi.

Spiritual leadership in Gantois terreiro passes directly from mother to daughter. When Mãe Maria Júlia died in 1910, her eldest daughter Pulquéria da Conceição Nazaré (1840–1918) became the new mãe-de-santo.
