= Mãe Nitinha de Oxum =

Brazilian Candomblé priestess

- Born: September 12, 1925
- Died: February 4, 2008 (aged 82)
- Occupation: Candomblé Mãe-de-santo

Areonite da Conceição Chagas or Mãe Nitinha de Oxum (12 September 1925 to 4 February 2008) was a Brazilian Iaquequerê, Iatebexê, e Ojuodé of the Candomblé temple (in Portuguese, terreiro) Casa Branca do Engenho Velho in Salvador, Bahia, and later Ialorixá at the Terreiro de Nossa Senhora das Candeias in Miguel Couto, greater Rio de Janeiro.

== Biography ==
Areonithe Conceição Chagas was born in Santo Amaro, Bahia on September 12, 1925. Her mother was a mãe-de-santo (Candomblé religious leader).

Mãe Nitinha married “Seu Benzinho”, a man from neighboring Cachoeira, at age 14.

After her marriage dissolved, Mãe Nitinha worked as a midwife and elementary teacher in Portão, Bahia.

Mãe Nitinha founded her first Candomblé temple in 1960 in the community of Santo Amaro do Ipitanga in Pitangueiras, Bahia.

In April 1972, Mãe Nitinha founded the Asè Iyá Nasso Oká Ilê Osum – Sociedade Nossa Senhora das Candeias in Nova Iguaçu Rio de Janeiro state.

In 2000, the Brazilian government recognized Mãe Nitinha by granting her the right to draw from the state retirement program after working for fifty years as a Candomblé priestess. This was the first case where an Afro-Brazilian Pai-de-santo was granted the same retirement rights given to Catholic priests or Evangelical pastors.

In 2005, the Brazilian government chose Mãe Nitinha as a representative of a multi-faith religious group sent to Rome to attend the funeral of Pope John Paul II. Unfortunately, she was not able to attend because she arrived to the airport late and missed her flight.

Mãe Nitinha died on February 4, 2008, in Brotas' Hospital Evangélico. She had been admitted for 12 days for a pulmonary infection. Mãe Nitinha was buried on February 5 in Salvador's Cemitério Jardim da Saudade, wearing the white and gold vestments of Oxúm. Bahia's State Secretary for the Promotion of Equality, Luiz Alberto, attended, saying that he "represents the condolences of Bahia's governor (Jaques Wagner) and of Brazil's president (Luiz Inácio Lula da Silva), who lament the death of this important representative of Candomblé." Additional rituals followed at the Casa Branca terreiro.
