= Ilê Axé Iyá Omin Iyamassê =

Candomblé terreiro in Salvador, Bahia, Brazil

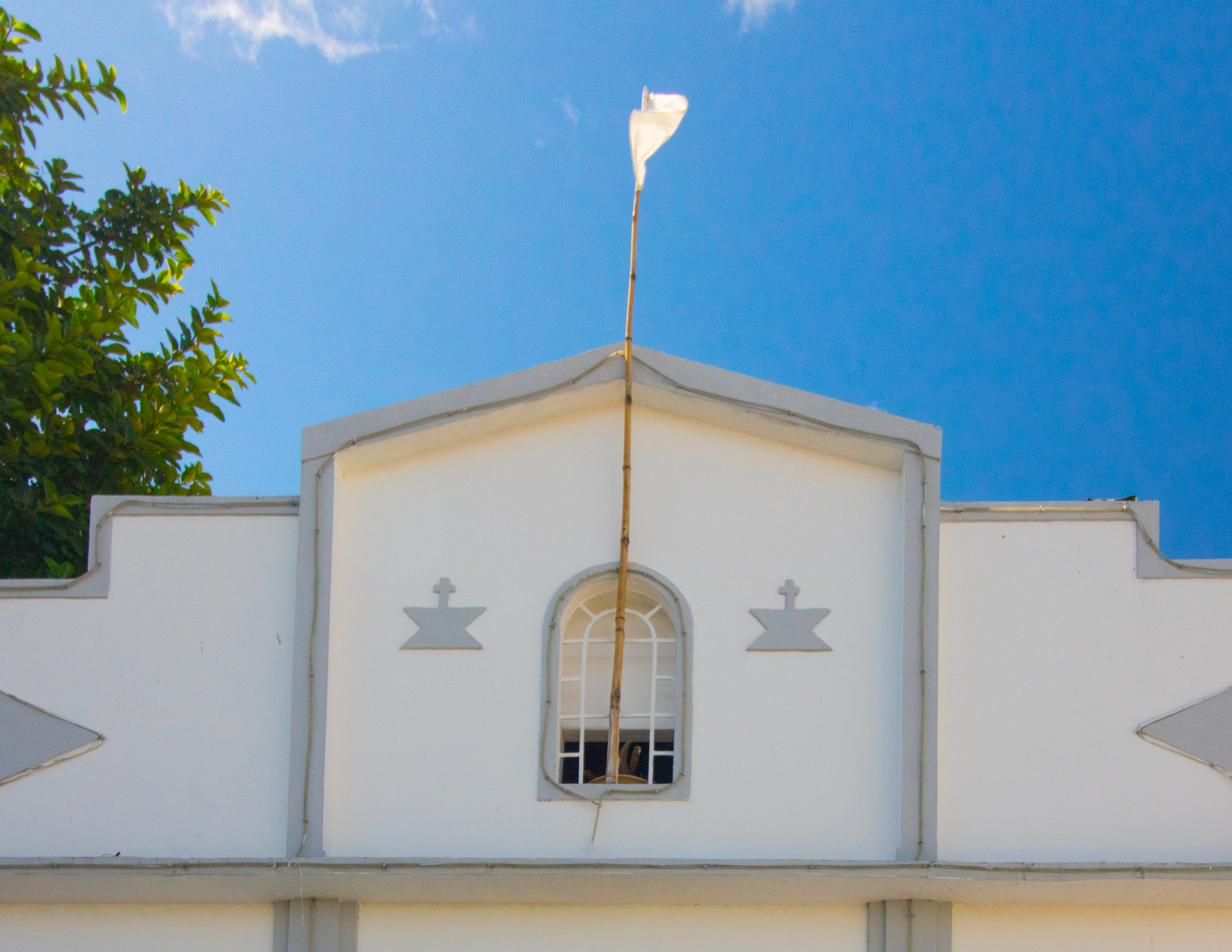

Religion
- Affiliation: Candomblé
- Sect: Ketu
- District: Federação

Location
- Municipality: Salvador
- State: Bahia
- Country: Brazil
- Interactive map of Ilê Axé Iyá Omin Iyamassê
- Coordinates: 12.995660°S 38.507852°W

Architecture
- Founder: Mãe Menininha do Gantois

National Historic Heritage of Brazil
- Designated: 2000
- Reference no.: 1471

Ilê Axé Iyá Omin Iyamassê is a Candomblé terreiro in Salvador, Bahia, Brazil. It is also known as the Terreiro do Gantois or the Sociedade São Jorge do Gantois. It is located on Alto do Gantois Avenue in the Federação neighborhood of Salvador. The terreiro is associated with the Ketu branch of the religion. It shares a history with the Ilê Axé Iyá Nassô Oká (Terreiro da Casa Branca) and Ilê Axé Opô Afonjá. The terreiro occupies 3,600 square metres (39,000 ft^{2}) ranging from the ridge of a hill and a small valley.

== Founding ==
The terreiro was founded by Maria Júlia da Conceição Nazaré. Its best-known spiritual leader was Maria Escolástica da Conceição Nazaré Assunção or Mãe Menininha do Gantois (1894-1986). Succession rules limit the head position of the terreiro, the Ialorixá, to female individuals. Senior positions in the terreiro are further restricted to descendants of the founder.

== Terreiro ==
The main structure of the terreiro, known as a barracão, sits at the top of the property and includes a hall for public ceremonies, kitchen is used for the preparation of ritual foods, dining room, dressing rooms, and private rooms for religious leaders of the terreiro. The Mãe Menininha do Gantois Memorial is located adjacent to the main barracão. Shrines dedicated to Exu, Omolu, and Ogun are located outside the main barracão. Of particular importance are a fig tree (Ficus) and a jackfruit tree dedicated to Ogun.

== Gantois ==
The terreiro has historically been known as Gantois, the Portuguese-language name for Ghent, Belgium. The name is a reference to the birthplace of the original owner of the property Edoard Gantois. Gantois was a navigator and slave trader who operated between Bahia and the slave markets of Ouidah, Benin and Lagos, Nigeria. He leased the land to Maria Júlia da Conceição Nazareth, the founder of the terreiro.

== Lineage ==
- Maria Júlia da Conceição Nazaré (1800?-1910), founder of the terreiro. Ialorixá from 1849 to 1910
- Pulchéria Maria da Conceição (1841-1918), Ialorixá from 1910 to 1918
- Maria da Glória Nazareth (1879 – 1920), Ialorixá from 1918 to 1920
- Mãe Menininha do Gantois (1894-1986), Ialorixá from 1922 to 1986
- Mãe Cleusa Millet, Ialorixá from 1989 to 1998
- Mãe Carmen Ialorixá from 1990 to the present

== Heritage status ==
Ilê Axé Iyá Omin Iyamassê received heritage status by the Brazilian National Institute of Historic and Artistic Heritage (IPHAN) on December 17, 2002.
