= Ilé Axé Asìpá =

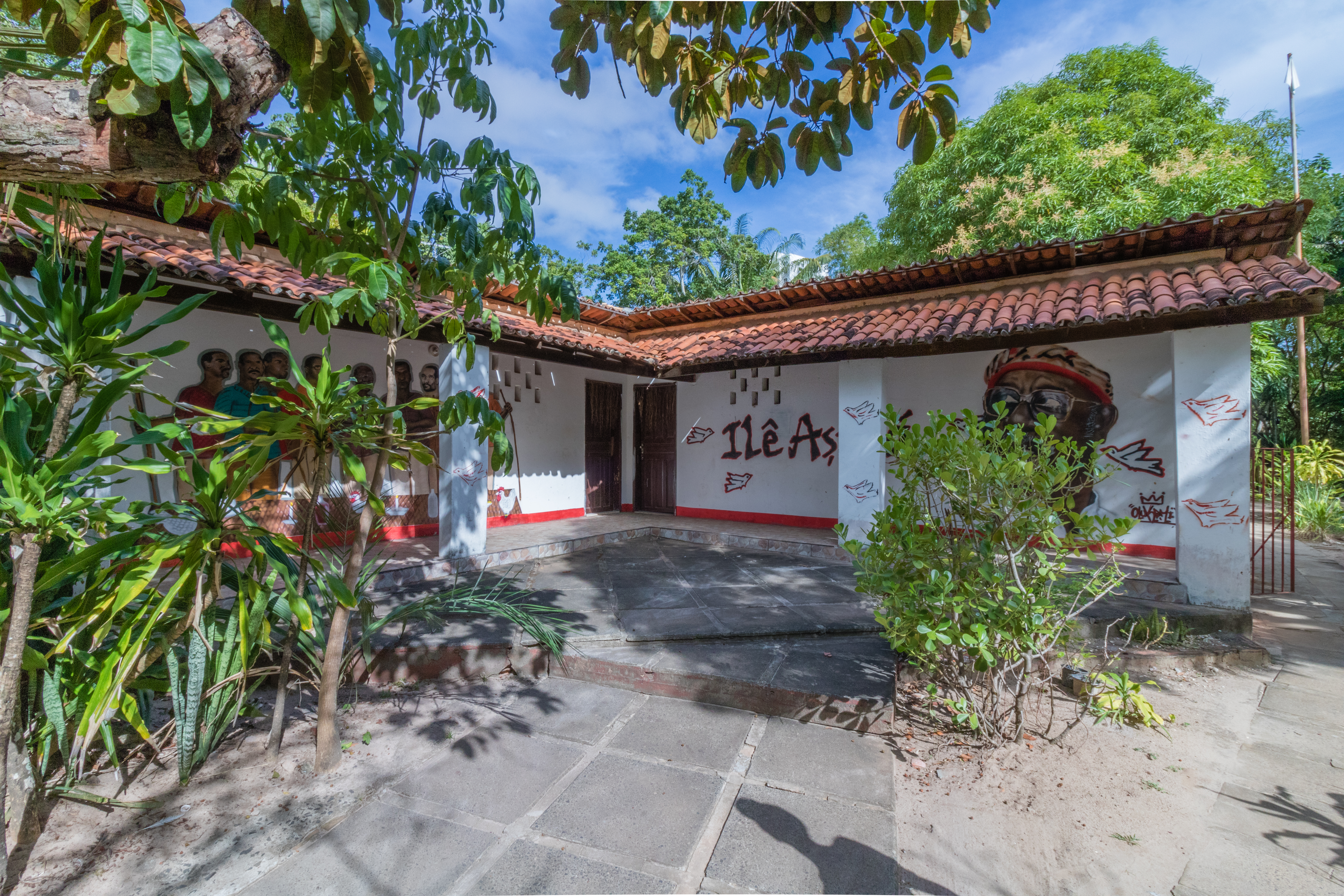

Religion
- Affiliation: Candomblé

Location
- Municipality: Salvador
- State: Bahia
- Country: Brazil
- Interactive map of Ilé Axé Asìpá
- Coordinates: 12.938309°S 38.381452°W

Architecture
- Creator: Deoscoredes Maximiliano dos Santos (Maestre Didi)
- Completed: 1980

Ilé Axé Asìpá, also known as the Sociedade Cultural e Religiosa Ilê Axipá, is an Afro-Brazilian terreiro in Salvador, Bahia, Brazil. It was founded by Descoscoredes Maximiliano dos Santos (1917–2013), commonly known as Maestre Didi, in 1980. Ilé Axé Asìpá is dedicated to the worship of egum or male ancestors, in contrast to Candomblé terreiros dedicated to the worship of orixás, or deities of the Yoruba pantheon. Terreiros dedicated to egum appeared in Brazil in the early 19th century, largely by slaves associated with the city of Oyo in Nigeria. The chief priest in an egum terreiro is known as a Ojé or Babá Ojé. The hierarchy of egum terreiros is strictly patriarchal; unlike Candomblé temples, women are not initiated into leadership roles.

While dedicated to the worship of egum, Ilê Axipá is associated with the Ketu sect of Candomblé.

== History ==
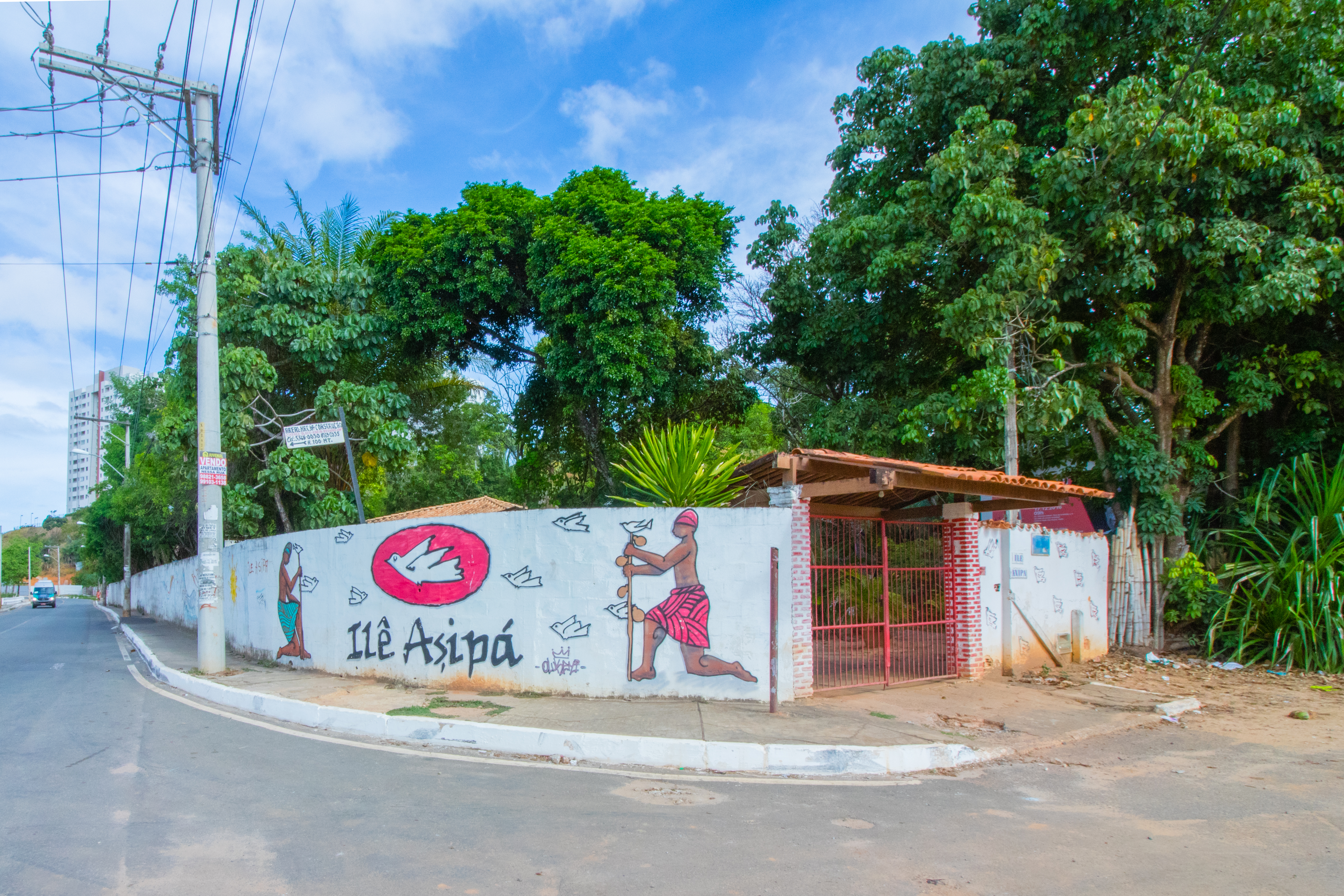
Entrance, Ilé Axé Asìpá, Salvador, Bahia, Brazil

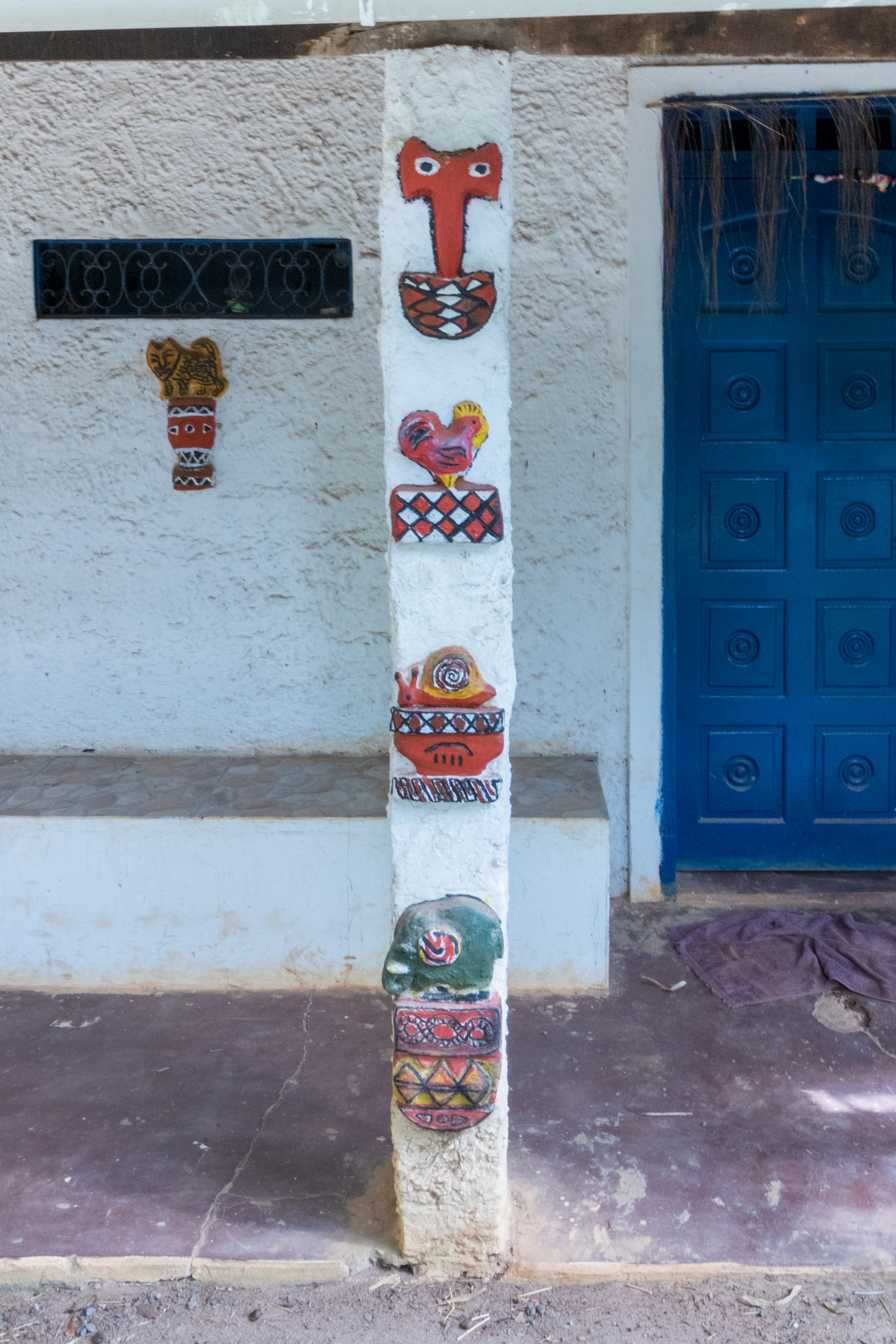
Sacred artwork on column, Ilé Axé Asìpá, Salvador, Bahia, Brazil

Ilê Axipá is located on Rua da Gratidão in the Piatã neighborhood of Salvador at the margins of Paz neighborhood. The ethnologist Maria Gabriela Hita noted that despite the stature of Mestre Didi and visits by prominent figures in Bahian society, the terreiro has few followers in the neighborhood and has not participated in its urban renewal or other social movements.

== Lineage ==
- Maestre Didi (1980–2013)

== Protected status ==
The Institute of Artistic and Cultural Heritage of Bahia listed the Ilé Axé Asìpá as a state heritage site in 2017.
