= Mãe Judith =

Candomblé priestess (died 1940)

Mãe Judith (died 1940) was a West African enslaved woman who was taken to Brazil. In Brazil, she became a Mãe-de-santo (Portuguese pronunciation: [ˈmɐ̃j d(ʒi) ˈsɐ̃tu], priestess) in the disaporic Afro-Brazilian religion Candomblé (Portuguese pronunciation: [kɐ̃dõˈblɛ]). She was the founder and first mother saint of the Terreiro Aganjú Didê [pt] place of worship in São Gonçalo dos Campos. She was also known by the names Judith Ferreira do Sacramento and Girl of Xangô.

== Life ==
Mãe Judith was born in West Africa and her date of birth is unknown. She was enslaved and transported on a slave ship to Brazil as a child. She was rescued from slavery in Brazil by Joao da Lama, who had been told of her arrival and to rescue her by his Shango (spiritual advisor).

In 1913, Mãe Judith founded, was Mãe-de-santo (Portuguese pronunciation: [ˈmɐ̃j d(ʒi) ˈsɐ̃tu], priestess) and became the first mother saint of the Terreiro Aganjú Didê [pt] place of worship. The Terreiro was built on a site of 21 hectares, in São Gonçalo dos Campos. Mãe Judith purchased the land deed from the Union Factory Company of Bahia. The local area was densely populated by communities who worshipped the diasporic Afro-Brazilian religions and were descended from enslaved people of African origin.

Mãe Judith's Terreiro has continued to be held by the religious community and the Nago Tedo nation since its founding, is recognized as "Intangible Heritage of the State of Bahia" and is protected by the Institute of Artistic and Cultural Heritage of Bahia (IPAC) [pt]. However, in February 2019, the Terreiro was invaded by a security guard and three armed men representing a paper company in the region that claimed to own the land.

Mãe Judith was active in claiming citizenship and the right to religious freedom and was written about negatively by outraged Roman Catholic writers of the local A Ordem (The Order) newspaper. She was leader of the community until her death in 1940 in Cachoeira, Brazil, and was succeeded by her nephew Marcus. Mãe Judith was also known by the names Judith Ferreira do Sacramento and Girl of Xangô.
