= Mãe Cleusa Millet =

Brazilian physician (1923–1997)

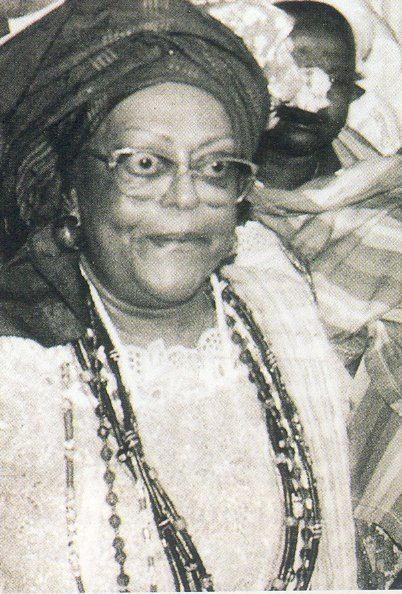
- Born: Cleusa da Conceição Nazaré de Oliveira; 1923; Salvador da Bahia, Brazil
- Died: 15 October 1998 (aged 74–75); Salvador da Bahia, Brazil
- Other name: Cleusa Millet
- Occupation: physician/priestess
- Years active: 1946-1998
- Known for: leading the Ilê Ìyá Omi Àse Iyámasé (House of the Mother of Waters) of Gantois
- Spouse: Eraldo Diógenes Millet

Cleusa da Conceição Nazaré de Oliveira, better known as Mãe Cleusa Millet or Mother Millet (1923–1998), was the hereditary spiritual leader (iyalorixá) of Brazil's most noted Candomblé temple, Terreiro do Gantois, located in Alto do Gantois in Salvador, Bahia, Brazil. Upon her death, she was accorded an official state day of mourning and was posthumously inducted into the Order of Merit of the State of Bahia.

== Early life and education ==
Cleusa da Conceição Nazaré de Oliveira was born in 1923 in Salvador, Bahia, Brazil to Maria Escolástica da Conceição Nazareth (known as Mãe Menininha do Gantois or Mother Menininha) and her husband Álvaro MacDowell de Oliveira. As is customary among some of Brazil's Afro-Brazilian communities, her surname reflects her matrilineal descent. Cleusa's mother Menininha was one of the most celebrated Candomblé iyalorixás in Brazil: of royal Yoruba ancestry, she served as the high priestess of the Terreiro do Gantois for nearly 65 years. Cleusa grew up in the order, Ilê Ìyá Omi Àse Iyámasé (House of the Mother of Waters) of Gantois and though it is traditional for the oldest daughter to take over upon the Mother's death, she did not want a religious life.

She enrolled at Federal University of Bahia and studied medicine, graduating with her degree in 1946.

== Career ==
Shortly after graduation, she moved to Rio de Janeiro, and began working as an obstetrician. For seven years, she worked as a doctor in Rio and then in 1953, she married Eraldo Diogenes Millet, an officer in the Navy. They subsequently had three children and the family traveled around the world. When her husband retired, Cleusa closed her office in Rio in 1965 and they moved back to Salvador. For a while she continued practicing medicine in Bahia, but increasingly she found herself offering medical services for free, delivering babies at home, or helping in the neighborhood. The community and social work soon began to be the focus of her life and she stopped making rounds at the hospital, finding herself helping her mother more and more as she aged. Her mother died in 1986 and as per custom, three years would pass before her successor was named. (Note: The founder of the Ilê Ìyá Omi Àse Iyámasé (House of the Mother of Waters) of Gantois in 1849 was Maria Júlia da Conceição Nazaré. Her daughter Pulchéria Maria da Conceição Nazaré took over the house in 1900 and died in 1918. Because she had no children, her niece Maria da Glória Nazaré was designated as her successor, but Maria died in 1920 before assuming office. Maria Escolástica da Conceição Nazaré (aka Mãe Menininha do Gantois) was chosen as the successor in 1922. Following her death, Cleusa was chosen as priestess and in October 2002, three years after her death, the deities chose her younger sister, Mãe Carmem de Òsàlá to succeed her.) In 1989, Cleusa became the priestess of the Terreiro do Gantois following the selection of the shells by the orisha. Once she became iyalorixá (sometimes translated as mother-of-saints, mother-of-orishas or priestess), Cleusa held the highest office of Candomblé and became a spiritual guide for her followers. She advised, made predictions, presided at ritual services, as well as performing community services, protecting the faith and preserving its traditions.

Cleusa died on 15 October 1998 in the Alliance Hospital in Salvador. The governor of Bahia, César Borges, declared an official day of mourning for the state. She was buried in the Jardim da Saudade Cemetery. In 2008 she was awarded the Order of Merit of Bahia for her community service to the area surrounding the Terreiro do Gantois.
