= Gisèle Cossard =

French-Brazilian anthropologist, writer and religious leader (1923–2016)

Giselle Cossard Binon
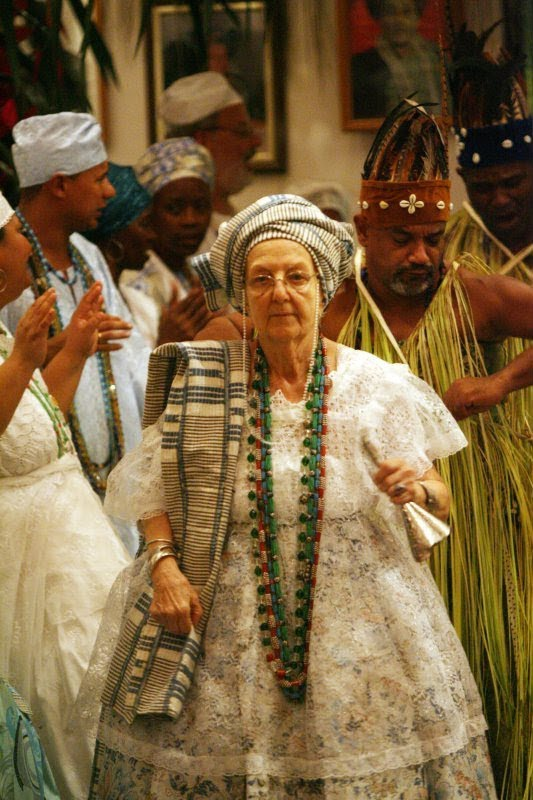
- Giselle Cossard Binon Omindarewa
- Born: Giselle Cossard; 31 May 1923; Tangier, Morocco
- Died: 21 January 2016 (aged 92); Rio de Janeiro
- Occupations: Iyalorixá (religious leader), Writer, Anthropologist, Adida Cultural
- Years active: 1923 – 2016
- Spouse: Jean Binon

Giselle Cossard Binon Omindarewa, (31 May 1923, Tangier - 21 January 2016, Duke of Caxias), Mãe-de-santo of Candomblé of Rio de Janeiro, was a French Brazilian anthropologist and writer. She was also known as Mother Giselle of Yemoja, Daughter of Saint John of Goméia, Initiated for the Orisha Yemoja.

== Childhood ==
Gisele Cossard was born in 1923 in Tangier, Morocco, where her father was a military man. Her family raised her in the Catholic faith. Her father was a primary teacher and her mother, a pianist at the Paris Conservatory. During World War I (1914–1918), her father been sent to that extreme tip of Africa, which at the time was a French protectorate, became fascinated by the country and remained there until 1925. When he returned to France with his wife and the daughter, Gisele mentioned she did not have memories of that period, but according to the researcher Michel Déon, author of the biography Omindarewá - Uma Francesa no Candomblé (Editor Pallas), the collection of art objects that her parents brought from that African country, as well as its fantastic stories, constituted for her "an endless source of wonderment."

== Books written by her ==
- Contribution to the Study of Candomblés of Brazil. The Rite Angola. (3rd cycle), 1970
- The Daughter of Saint, In: Carlos Eugênio Marcondes de Moura (org.). Olóòrisà: Writings on the Religion of the Orixás. São Paulo, Ágora, 1981
- Anthropologist Says, In: Hubert Fichte. Ethnopoetry: Poetic Anthropology of Afro-Brazilian Religions: 39–91. São Paulo, Brasiliense, 1987.
- AWÔ, The Mystery of the Orixás. Ed. Pallas, 2007.

== Bibliography ==
- Omindarewa - A Frenchwoman at Candomblé - in search of another truth. Michel Dion. Ed. Pallas, 2002
- Mother of Saint to French. Bruno Ribeiro - Brazilian Magazine
- memoires-de-candomble-omindarewa-iyalorisa Dion 1998

== Filmography ==
- A cidade das mulheres/ The city of women, documentary - directed by Lázaro Faria, Brazil, 2005.
- Gisele Omindarewa, directed by Clarice Ehlers Peixoto, Brazil, 2009.
