= Deoscóredes Maximiliano dos Santos =

Mestre Didi
- Born: 2 December 1917; Salvador
- Citizenship: Brazilian
- Occupation(s): writer, religious leader

Deoscóredes Maximiliano dos Santos (1917–2013), widely known as Mestre Didi, was a Brazilian artist, educator, translator, and Candomblé priest. He is recognized for his significant contributions to Afro-Brazilian religious culture and contemporary art, particularly through his work in preserving and promoting the traditions of Orisha and Egun worship in Brazil.

== Early life ==
Mestre Didi was born in Salvador, Bahia, Brazil, in 1917. He was the son of Maria Bibiana do Espírito Santo (Mãe Senhora), the third Iyalorixá (female religious leader) of the Ilê Axé Opo Afonjá terreiro, and Arsênio dos Santos, a tailor.

== Priesthood ==
Initiated into Candomblé by Iyalorixá Eugênia Ana dos Santos (Mãe Aninha) in 1936, Mestre Didi assumed the position of Assoba, the highest order in Orisha worship for the land of Obaluayê/Omolu. He later became Alapini, the principal priest of Egun ancestral worship, an ancient Yoruba tradition originating in Nigeria. His leadership roles in both cults emphasized the importance of ritual objects, which would become central to his artistic practice.

== Artistic career ==
Mestre Didi began exhibiting his work in the 1960s, gaining recognition both in Brazil and internationally. His sculptures are noted for their use of organic materials such as cowries, seeds, leather, palm fronds, and leaf veins. These materials are traditionally associated with Afro-Brazilian religious practices and are used to create forms representing birds, snakes, and ritual objects like the Ibiri de Nanã and the Xaxará de Obaluayê/Omolu.

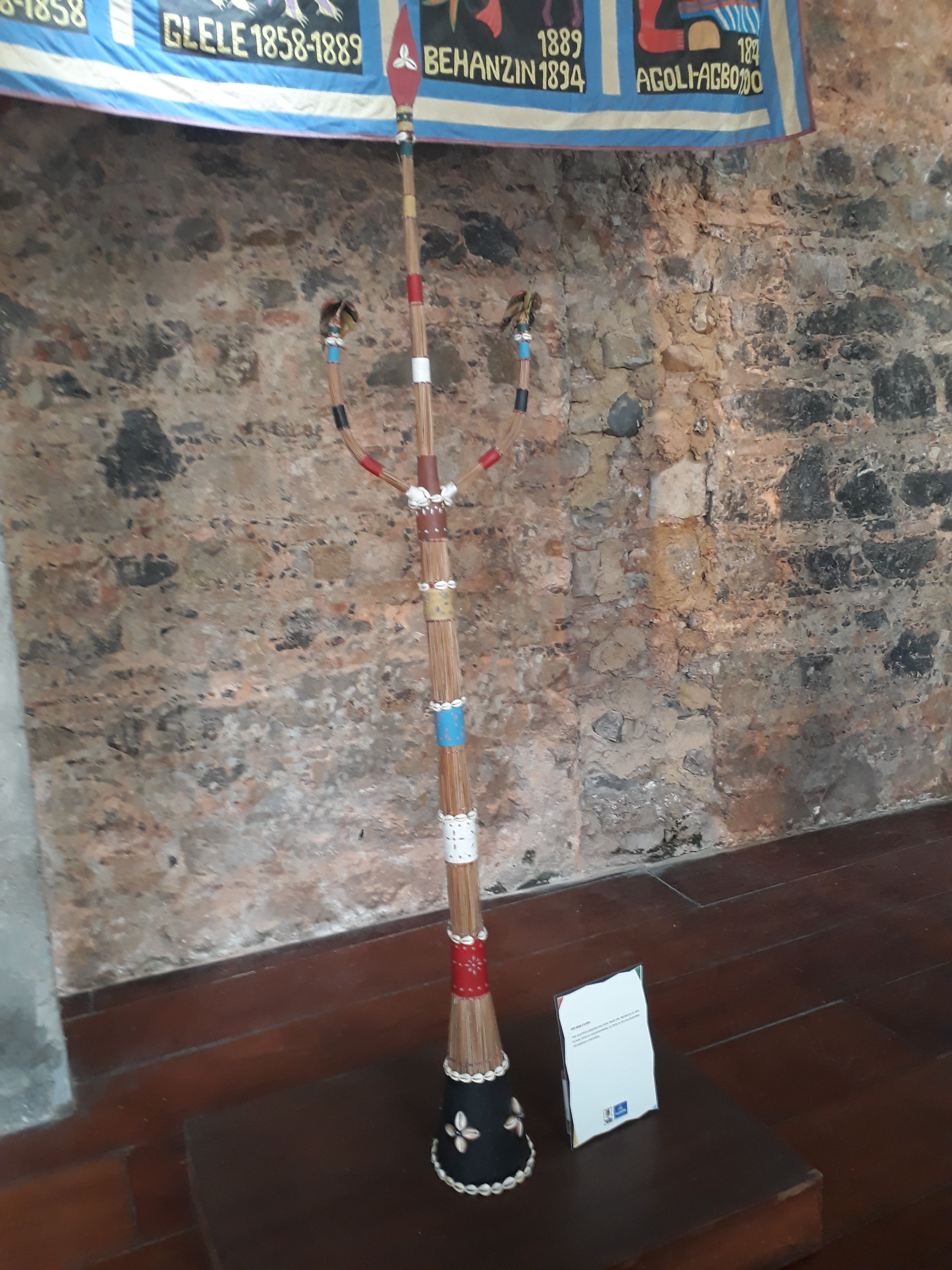
Sculptural work created by the artist Mestre Didi. It represents a spear scepter, with two birds at its ends, shaped like palm leaf veins, symbolizing collectivity. Collection of Casa do Benin, Salvador – 2019.

His artistic output is characterized by a synthesis of sacred and contemporary aesthetics, reflecting the continuity and transformation of African cultural values in the modern world. Mestre Didi's work has been exhibited in countries including Germany, Argentina, the United States, France, Ghana, England, Italy, and Nigeria. He was one of three Brazilian artists featured in the 1989 exhibition Magiciens de la Terre at the Centre Georges Pompidou in France. In 1996, he was honored with a special room at the 23rd São Paulo Biennale.

== Personal life ==
Mestre Didi was married for 43 years to anthropologist Juana Elbein dos Santos.

== Awards ==
- 1996, Order of Cultural Merit
