= São Gonçalo dos Campos =

Municipality of Bahia State, Brazil

- Flag Coat of arms

- Coordinates: 12°25′58″S 38°58′01″W
- Country: Brazil
- Region: Northeast
- State: Bahia
- Founded: 28 July
- Elevation: 242 m (794 ft)

Population (2020)
  - Total: 37,942
- Time zone: UTC−3 (BRT)
- Postal code: 2929305

São Gonçalo dos Campos is a municipality in the state of Bahia in the North-East region of Brazil.

== See also ==
- List of municipalities in Bahia
