= Terreiro do Bate Folha =

Candomblé temple in Salvador, Bahia, Brazil

Terreiro do Bate Folha, Mansu Banduquenqué, or Sociedade Beneficente Santa Bárbara do Bate Folha, is a candomblé terreiro located in Salvador, Bahia. It was founded in 1916 by Tata Manoel Bernardino da Paixão and is currently chaired by Tata Muguanxi, Cícero Rodrigues Franco Lima. The terreiro, historically affiliated with Candomblé Bantu, has the largest remaining urban area of the Atlantic Forest, approximately 15.5 hectares. It was listed by IPHAN on October 10, 2003.

== Origin ==
In the year 1881, Salvador, Bahia, Manoel Bernardino da Paixão was born. When he was already 38 years old, Bernardino was initiated into the traditions of the Congo by the Muxicongo (designation of the natives of the Congo), Manoel Encoce, a priest initiated in Africa, receiving then the dijina of Ampumandezu.

After the death of Manoel Encoce, Bernardino moved to the house of his inseparable friend Maria Genoveva do Bonfim - Tuhenda diá Nzambi, better known as Maria Neném, the mãe do Angola in Bahia.

Maria Neném was the saint's daughter of Roberto Barros Reis, an Angolan slave, owned by the Barros Reis family, who lent her the name by which she was known.

The obligation to which Bernardino submitted himself on June 13, 1910, coincided with the initiation of Manoel Ciríaco de Jesus, born on August 8, 1892, also in Bahia, which caused the connection established between Bernardino and Ciríaco. Years later, with the death of his eldest saint-brother, Manoel Cambambi, who at the time had an open house in Bahia, Ciríaco succeeded Cambambi, in the terreiro that is now known as Tumba Junsara.

As time went by, Bernardino, already very famous, founded Candomblé Bate Folha, located in Mata Escura do Retiro, in Salvador, Bahia. The land where Candomblé is established, at Travessa de São Jorge, 65, is surrounded by century-old trees and considered the largest terreiro in Brazil which, at the time, was presented to Bamburucema, its second muquixi, since the first was Lemba.

In this way it is clear that, due to the origins of Manoel Encoce, Bate Folha is Congo and maintains Angola, on the part of Maria Neném.

It was on December 4, 1929 that Bernardino took out his first boat, whose Rianga (1st Son of the house) was João Correia de Mello, who was also from Lemba.
