= Mãe Stella de Oxóssi =

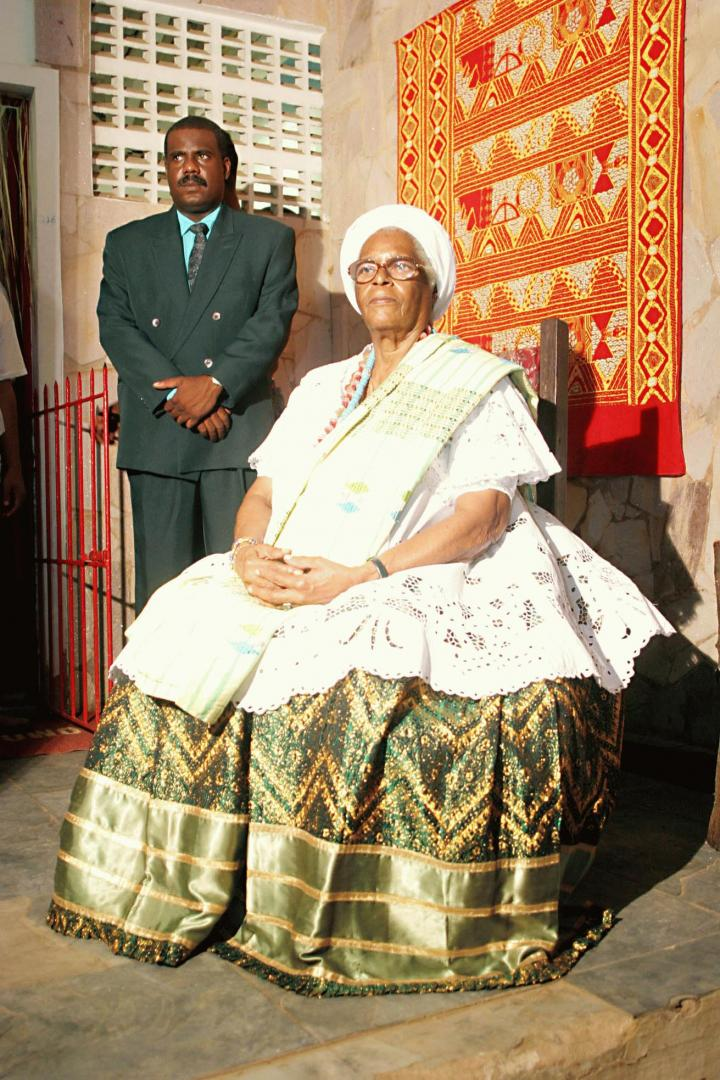
- Mãe Stella de Oxóssi
- Born: Maria Stella de Azevedo Santos; May 2, 1925; Salvador, Bahia, Brazil
- Died: December 27, 2018 (aged 93); Santo Antônio de Jesus, Bahia, Brazil
- Occupations: Candomblé priestess and author

Mãe Stella de Oxóssi (born Maria Stella de Azevedo Santos, also known as Odé Kayodê, 2 May 1925 – 27 December 2018) was a iyalorixá, or priestess, in the Brazilian Candomblé religion. She was the fifth iyalorixá (chief priestess) of Ilê Axé Opô Afonjá, a Candomblé terreiro in Salvador, Bahia, Brazil. Mãe Stella was trained as a public health nurse. She was initiated into the Candomblé religion in 1939 and became the iyalorixá of Ilê Axé Opô Afonjá in 1976. Mãe Stella is noted for writing on the beliefs and practices of Candomblé for the general public, rather than practitioners. She lived in the interior of Bahia after a stroke and was interred in Salvador after her death in 2018.

== Early life ==
Mãe Stella de Oxóssi was born in Salvador, the fourth daughter of Esmeraldo Antigno dos Santos and Thomázia de Azevedo Santos. She became an orphan and was raised by her maternal aunt. She studied at the Federal University of Bahia and graduated from the School of Nursing and Public Health. Mãe Stella de Oxóssi worked as a community health nurse for more than thirty years.

== Leadership in Candomblé ==
She was initiated by Mãe Senhora (1890-1967) on September 12, 1939, at the age of 14. She received the orukó (spiritual name) of Odé Kayodê at this time. Mãe Stella studied under Mãe Senhora at Ilê Axé Opô Afonjá until Mãe Senhora's death in 1967. She was named the fifth iyalorixá of Ilê Axé Opó Afonjá on March 19, 1976, succeeding Mãe Ondina de Oxalá (1916-1975). She retired from nursing in the same year.

Mãe Stella de Oxóssi visited Yoruba holy sites in Osogbo, Osun State, Nigeria beginning in 1981. The visit began religious and cultural exchanges between the Candomblé and Yoruba religious communities in Brazil and Nigeria. Mãe Stella also began to write articles and books on Candomblé traditions and practices, which were largely orally transmitted into the 20th century. She opened a museum, Ohun Lailai Museum, in 1981. It was the first public museum attached to a Candomblé terreiro. The museum displays clothing used in Candomblé rituals, chairs, ritual objects, ritual instruments, and cooking implements; these were largely hidden or unknown to the general public prior to the opening of the museum. Mãe Stella campaigned for the recognition of Ilê Axé Opô Afonjá by the National Institute of Historic and Artistic Heritage (IPHAN). The terreiro was recognized as a federal protected historic site in 1999.

== Beliefs ==
Mãe Stella de Oxóssi is noted for her opposition to syncretism between Candomblé and Catholicism, long a basis of Candomblé practice. While writing on mutual respect between the religions, she wrote that "I am not against the Catholic Church, but against syncretism." She advocated for the removal of statues of Catholic saints from Candomblé altars, and used the Yoruba language-term iyalorixá instead of the Portuguese mãe de santo. Mãe Stella advocated for the use of Yoruba in both naming practices and liturgy.

Those who practice and believe, witness and feel. Faith encompasses the whole person. It is not reached by intellect. Also, one only reaches the Orisha through the heart. [...] We do not choose the Orisha. It is he who chooses us, the same thing happens, I believe, in all types of priesthood and in all religions. The important thing is that love takes care of our lives.

== Death ==
Mãe Stella de Oxóssi moved to the city of Nazaré das Farinhas in the interior of Bahia in 2017 after a stroke. She died in Santo Antônio de Jesus on December 27, 2018. After a disagreement over the location of her funeral arrangements, Mãe Stella was interred in Salvador.
