= Ilê Axé Opô Afonjá =

Candomblé terreiro in Salvador, Bahia, Brazil

Ilê Axé Opó Afonjá
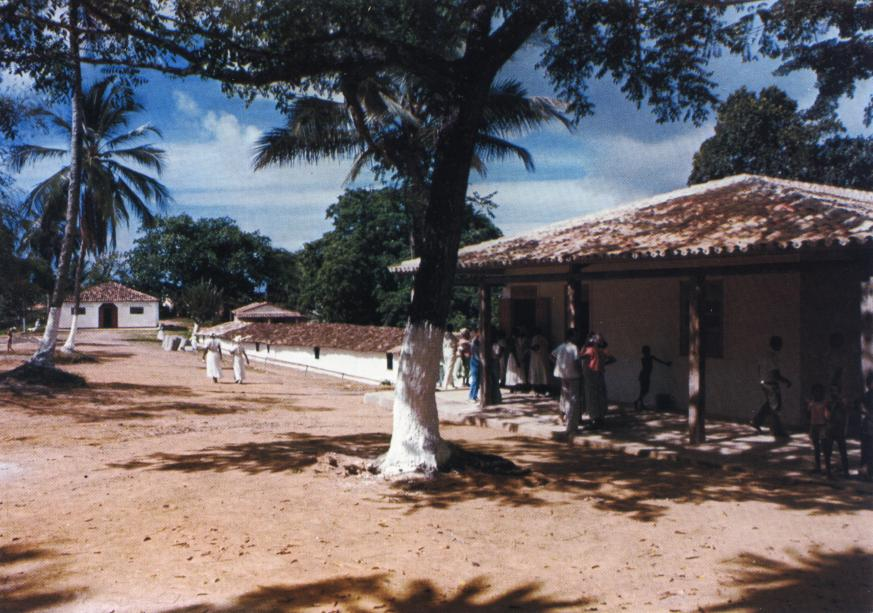
- Ilê Axé Opó Afonjá, the Casa de Xangô, Salvador, Bahia, Brazil

- Location of Ilê Axé Opó Afonjá in Brazil

Religion
- Affiliation: Candomblé
- Sect: Ketu
- Year consecrated: 1910

Location
- Municipality: Salvador
- State: Bahia
- Country: Brazil
- Interactive map of Ilê Axé Opó Afonjá
- Coordinates: 12.997081°S 38.494881°W

Architecture
- Founder: Eugênia Ana dos Santos

National Historic Heritage of Brazil
- Designated: 1998
- Reference no.: 1432

Ilê Axé Opó Afonjá, also known as Centro Santa Cruz Axé of Opó Afonjá or Casa de Xangô, is a Candomblé terreiro in Salvador, Bahia, Brazil. It was founded by Eugênia Anna Santos (1869-1938), better known as Mãe Aninha, in 1910. The terreiro is located in the Cabula neighborhood on Rua de São Gonçalo do Retiro. Ilê Axé Opó Afonjá was the second Afro-Brazilian religious place of worship to receive heritage status from the Brazilian National Historic and Artistic Heritage Institute (IPHAN).

Ilê Axé Opó Afonjá was formed in 1910 by a group that separated from Ilê Axé Iyá Nassô Oká, or the Casa Branca do Engenho Velho. It is one of the primary temples of the Ketu sect of Candomblé. A terreiro of the same name was founded by Mãe Aninha in Rio de Janeiro. In 1967 the Terreiro was visited by Jean-Paul Sartre and Simone de Beauvoir who were invited by Jorge Amado and Zélia Gattai.

== Grounds and structures ==
Ilê Axé Opó Afonjá covers 3.9 square kilometres (1.5 mi^{2}). Two-thirds of the land is covered in dense vegetation. The remainder includes religious structures, sacred plants, and a fountain dedicated to Oxum. Terreiro structures include a central temple, the Casa de Xangô, and sanctuaries dedicated to Oxalá (Obatala) and Iemanjá.

The terreiro has a public school, the Escola Eugênia Anna dos Santos, founded in 1976. The Ilê Ohum Lailai, also known as the Museu do Axé Opô Afonjá, is a museum founded to house physical objects related to the terreiro, including ceremonial objects, clothing, and cooking implements. It was founded in 1981. The Ikojopo Ilê Iwe Axé Opô Afonjá, also known as the Biblioteca do Axé, is a library opened by the terriro in 1996. Its collection consists of books related to African and Afro-Brazilian culture.

== Lineage ==
Ilê Axé Opó Afonjá has had six sacerdotisas, or religious leaders since 1910:

- Mãe Aninha - 1909-1938
- Mãe Bada de Oxalá - 1939-1941
- Mãe Senhora - 1942-1967
- Mãe Ondina de Oxalá - 1969-1975
- Mãe Stella de Oxóssi - 1976-2018
- Mãe Ana de Xangô - 2019-

== Festivals ==
Ilê Axé Opó Afonjá holds public festivals including one dedicated to Oxóssi, held on the same day as Feast of Corpus Christi. Another is dedicated to Xangô, which begins on the evening of June 28 and June 29. Festivals dedicated to other orixás are held on separate cycles.

== Heritage status ==
Ilê Axé Opó Afonjá received heritage status by the National Institute of Historic and Artistic Heritage (IPHAN) on July 28, 2000.
