= Eugênia Anna Santos =

Brazilian Iyalorixá

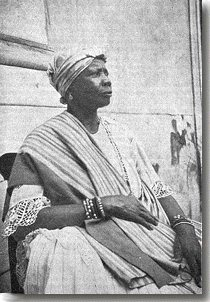
- Eugênia Anna Santos (Mãe Aninha, Oba Biyi)
- Born: 13 July 1869; Salvador, Bahia
- Died: 3 January 1938 (aged 68)
- Occupation: priest
- Known for: Iyalorixá

Eugênia Anna Santos (Mãe Aninha, Oba Biyi; Salvador, Bahia, 13 July 1869 - Salvador, 3 January 1938) was a Brazilian Iyalorixá. She founded the candomblé Ilê Axé Opó Afonjá in Salvador, now considered a National Historic Landmark, and in Rio de Janeiro.

== Life ==
Santos was born in 1869 to African parents of the Gurunsi nation. She served as the chief female officer, known as prioreza, of the Boa Morte sisterhood and Rosario brotherhood. In 1936, Santos was one of the founders of the Segundo Congresso Afro-Brasileiro.

== Legacy ==
Santos is remembered for her great leadership qualities and strength. Author Kim Butler states that she "went further than any other priest in transforming the terreiro into an alternative, African world in the heart of Brazil", which "reflected ways in which the candomblé community was part of the larger Afro-Bahaian community". Darlene Clark Hine and Jacqueline McLeod credit her with moving the "candomblé out of the shadows by opening the doors of her terreiro to the international community".

The Municipal School Eugenia Anna dos Santos was established in her name in 1978 for nursery children aged 6 months to 5 years, and from 1986, for elementary children from 1st to 4th grade.
