= Order of Our Lady of the Good Death =

Afro-Catholic religious group

- Irmandade da Nossa Senhora da Boa Morte
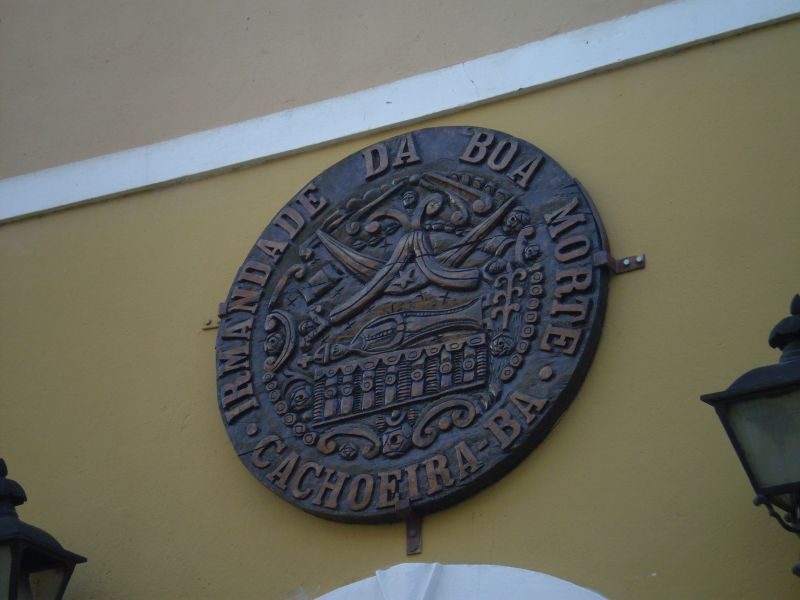
- Formation: 19th century
- Founded at: Salvador, Bahia, Brazil
- Type: Catholic-Candomblé religious order

The Confraternity of Our Lady of the Good Death (Portuguese: Irmandade da Nossa Senhora da Boa Morte) is a small Afro-Catholic religious group in the state of Bahia, Brazil.

Founded in the early 19th century as a Church-sponsored charitable sisterhood for female African slaves and former slaves, it became one of the oldest and most respected worship groups for Candomblé, the major African-based religion in Brazil. Presently reduced to about thirty members (from 200 or so at its height), most of them over fifty, it still attracts worshipers every year, especially at its August festival.

== History ==
The history of the Irmandade da Boa Morte ("Confraternity of the Good Death"), a religious group devoted to the Assumption of the Virgin, is part of the history of mass abduction of blacks from the African coast to the cane-growing catchment area around the port of Salvador, Bahia, known as the Recôncavo Baiano. Iberian adventurers built several towns in this area, one of them being Cachoeira, which was the second most important economic center in Bahia for three centuries.

=== Origin of confraternities ===
Confraternities proliferated during the 19th century, when the country was independent but still lived under the regime of slavery. For each profession, race and nation — because the African slaves and their descendants came from different places with different cultures — a separate irmandade was founded. There were confraternities for the rich, poor, musicians, blacks, whites, etc. There were almost none for women and in the male confraternities women entered as dependents to ensure they would receive benefits from the corporation after the death of their husbands. For the confraternity to operate, says historian João José Reis, a church had to welcome it and its statutes had to be approved by an ecclesiastical authority.

In a patriarchal society marked by racial and ethnic differences, the confraternity is made up exclusively of black women, which gives this Afro-Catholic manifestation — as some consider it — a certain fame. It is known both as an expression of Brazilian baroque Catholicism, with its distinctive street processions, and for its tendency to include in religious festivals profane rituals punctuated by a lot of samba and banqueting.

Besides the gender and race of the confraternity's members, their status as former slaves and descendants of slaves is an important social characteristic without which it would be difficult to understand many aspects of the confraternity's religious commitments. The former slaves have demonstrated enormous adroitness in worshiping in the religion of those in power without letting go of their ancestral beliefs, as well as in the ways they defend the interests of their followers and represent them socially and politically.

=== Date of foundation ===
No one really knows in what year the Confraternity of the Good Death was founded. Odorico speculates that the organized devotion began in 1820 in the Church of Rosário in Barroquinha, a borough of Salvador; and that Gêges (blacks of the Ewe and Fon ethnicities) who moved from there to Cachoeira were responsible for organizing it. Others speak of that period too, but disagree about the nation of the pioneers, saying they were freed Ketus (ethnic Yorubas). It seems that the membership of the Confraternity had a variety of ethnic origins and that they numbered more than a hundred in the first years.

Historically, the year 1820 makes sense. Since early in the nineteenth century, progress had been afoot in the Recôncavo and new agricultural and industrial techniques were introduced there. While the sugar economy was experiencing difficulties, tobacco gained new strength when it attracted the interest of German capital following the political independence of Brazil. The opening of motorized shipping lines strengthened the breeze of economic renewal, stimulating the integration of the Recôncavo with the provincial capital and increasing trade. This in turn encouraged the formation of strong links between black slaves in many cities, especially Salvador and Cachoeira.

Jeferson Bacelar notes that the 1820s, especially the first three years of the decade, were marked by a process of agitation and excitement among the people of Bahia, many of whom - regardless of social class - were involved in a struggle for Independence that was marked by a strong anti-Portuguese spirit and armed skirmishes. The easing of tension between masters and slaves elicited by this momentary “unity” contributed to the permanent removal of blacks to the cities of the Recôncavo, where slaveowners were very interested in solving the conflict and, to defend their interests, armed the slaves and used them against the Portuguese. This exceptional state of affairs resulted in a large number of religious and civil initiatives by the slaves, among them, perhaps, the Irmandade da Boa Morte. Antônio Moraes Ribeiro's research associates the Confraternity's emergence from the slave quarters with the abolitionist atmosphere after the brutally crushed revolt of Muslim slaves in Bahia in 1835. Perhaps that is the origin of the clearly Islamic touch to the Confraternity's traditional clothes. As Raul Lody notes, the costume's impressiveness is heightened by the use of a turban. Antônio Moraes believes that one of the probable leaders of the Islamic Revolt, Luiza Mahim, was personally involved in the founding of the Confraternity after her flight from Salvador to the Recôncavo.

The early nineteenth century narrative for formation holds more credence when looking at correspondences for the time. One such correspondence from 1854 comes from a local deputy who wrote to the justice department requesting reinforcements to handle the Festival of Our Lady of the Good Death which was set to take place in Salvador. This correspondence shows that by 1854 the Order must have had a considerable following and was well known in the time if police were asking for reinforcements over a month before the festival was set to take place.

=== From Church to Church ===
Luiz Cláudio Nascimento, an historian from Cachoeira, says that the first liturgies of the black Confraternity were held in the Church of the Third Order of Carmo, traditionally used by the local elites. Later the sisters moved to the Church of Santa Bárbara in the Santa Casa de Misericórdia hospital, where there are images of Our Lady of Glory and Our Lady of the Good Death. From there they moved to the Church of Amparo (which was demolished in 1946 and replaced by a middle class housing project). They left that church for the Parish Church (Igreja Matriz), and then went to the Church of Ajuda.

Many confraternities built their own churches. This was the case of the Church of Rosário in Barroquinha. The Confraternity of Good Death maintained close contact with this church and its own confraternity.

=== Social role ===
The religious confraternities of the 19th century — like the secular ones such as the Society for the Protection of the Handicapped, a case studied by the anthropologist Julio Braga — did more than revere Catholic saints and the orixás, or Afro-Brazilian divinities, of their members. While they outwardly met ecclesiastical and legal requirements, they become exclusive guilds that worked behind the scenes for the interests of their members. As respected organizations of solidarity, they were at the same time living expressions of inter-ethnic exchange and an ambiguous instrument of social control, whose participants were creative "managers".

The Confraternity always made its members contribute. One-off membership and annual fees, alms collected and other forms of income were used for a variety of purposes: purchases of freedom from slavery, festivals, religious obligations, payments for masses, charity, clothing. In the case of Boa Morte, whose members were relatively poor and almost all elderly—from 50 to 70 years old—the funds raised during members' lifetimes were always meant to pay for a decent funeral, whose preparations, given the dual religious activities of its members, required both rigor and understanding, besides being a nest-egg for the burial. Funds also paid for burial plots for individual members because most cemeteries restricted black burials in white cemeteries. The sisters also typically set aside some small amount of funds for the family of the deceased.

More recently, confraternities, and especially the Order of Our Lady of the Good Death, have been considered among the first examples of feminism in Brazil and the traditions that carry on today have been associated with the early roots of Brazilian feminism. The Order has spoken out on a number of social issues including poverty, police violence, and racial and gender equality and continues to act as a grassroots movement for social issues in Bahia. The sisters have also pushed issues of African resilience from their early years and have made it their mission to assure that all black lives could be filled with dignity. In 2018, activist and Rio de Janeiro city council member Marielle Franco, who was known for her work on social issues such as reproductive rights, police brutality, and gender equality, was assassinated in Rio de Janeiro. The Order’s festival that year honored her legacy and other black women who had fought for equal rights as they have honored individuals in this way for decades.

== Candomblé ==
In time the sisterhood has lessened its connection to the Catholic Church and has become a landmark of Candomblé, the main African-based religion of Brazil. Candomblé is a spiritist religion, that worships a complex pantheon of deities or guardian spirits, the Orixás. At Candomblé rituals, the Orixás are invoked and "incorporate" in the officiating priests.

Due to their secret nature the inner rites of their sisterhood, linked to the worship of the Orixás, have still not been the object of an ethnographic interpretation. What has been studied is the exterior part of the worship, which uses almost entirely Catholic symbols, appropriated by Afro-Brazilian religion. The high point of the sisterhood's activities is the Festival of Our Lady of the Good Death, held every year in Cachoeira.

=== Origins of the Festival ===
The Confraternity's Festival brings together elements of Candomblé worship with an ancient Christian festival, the Assumption of the Virgin, whose origins are in the Orient. The festival reached Rome in the 7th century, spread through the Catholic world over the next two centuries, and was eventually brought from Portugal to Brazil, where it was known as the festival of Our Lady of August.

Devotion to the Good Death was just as common in colonial and imperial Brazil as the confraternities. It has always been a popular cult. In the Church of Our Lady of Rosário in Barroquinha it became stronger and more consistent. There was considerable Gêge-Nagô presence there and the celebrations described by writers like Silva Campos were similar to contemporary practices in Cachoeira. One of the most respected candomblé centers in Bahia originated there; founded in the 18th century, the Casa Branca center in Engenho Velho da Federação in Salvador has been studied by Renato da Silveira.

=== Peculiar interpretation ===
The Confraternity's version of the Festival became a popular devotion with racial features as the sisterhood gathered mainly black and mixed-race women, and acquired a unique interpretation with its own characteristics. For that reason the group has always caused conflict with church authorities.

Candomblé lent elements of its belief system to a practice that was originally Catholic, as well as socio-historical components of the hard reality of slavery, of a captivity that made martyrs of those in the diaspora.

Veneration of Our Lady of the Good Death came to have social significance as it allowed slaves to gather, maintain their religiosity in a hostile environment and shape a corporate instrument for defending and valuing of individuals. It became, for all of these reasons, an unrivaled means of celebrating life.

=== The Festivities ===
At the beginning of August a long schedule of public events brings people from everywhere to Cachoeira, to what Moraes Ribeiro considers the most representative living document of Brazilian, baroque, Ibero-African religiosity. Suppers, parades, masses, processions, sambas-de-roda (a traditional form of playing and dancing the samba in a circle) put the Confraternity in the center of events in this provincial city and, ultimately, in the main newspapers and news networks of the capital.

The first day of the festival begins of the Friday closest to August 15 which is the traditional day of the Feast of the Assumption. The sisters, wearing all white, carry a reclining statue of Our Lady of the Good Death throughout the streets of Cachoeira in a quite procession and place the statue at the foot of the altar in their chapel. The procession shares the joint task of commemorating Mary and individuals who died in the last year. After the procession, the sisters hold confession and serve a holy dinner of white meats since they refrain from red meat on the day of the festival. The significance of the color white is linked to both Mary’s purity and to the Candomblé deity Oxalá who is associated with the dawn and the creation of the universe. The second day of the festival, the sisters of the Order spend the day preparing the food for the days of feasting which will take place in the latter half of the festival. In the evening, there is a mourning or funerary mass for Mary held in the chapel followed by a procession through the streets with the statue of Our Lady of the Good Death which acts as a recreation of the burial of Mary. During this procession, the sisters wear white clothing with black sashes and carry crosses along with the statue. After the procession, the sisters return the statue of Our Lady of the Good Death to the museum where it resides the rest of the year and remove the statue of Our Lady of Glory from the museum to be used in the festivities of the next day.

The third day of the festival is meant to celebrate the Catholic celebration of the Feast of the Assumption and marks the final traditional Catholic day of celebration. The Feast of the Assumption is celebrated each year by Catholics worldwide to celebrate the assumption, or total transfer of body and soul, of Mary into heaven after her death which is where the Order got the term “Good Death.” The day marks a turning point in the festival, going from a somber ritual to a joyous mass celebrating the assumption of Mary. This mass is followed by a parade through the streets with the statue of Our Lady of Glory and is orchestrated by one of the local bands that plays during the procession. In celebration, the sisters wear red satin sashes and bring out their finest attire and jewelry. After the parade and mass, the food that they prepared the day before is completed and a feast is held for the members of the town and visitors who travelled to watch the celebration. Beginning that evening, the sisters and others begin to dance the samba to show their faith to Mary and the other saints while also bringing in traditional Candomblé practices. This specific and traditional mix of African music and African dance goes back decades and was noted by government officials as far back as 1864 in Salvador, Brazil where the Order of the Good Death originated.

Candomblé traditions are incorporated in several ways during the festivities. The procession accompanied by music ties back to Candomblé traditions and celebrations. Many of the foods and drinks served in the days following the Feast of the Assumption have Candomblé and Brazilian roots including cachaca or sugarcane rum and caruru which is a blend of okra, nuts, and shrimp. Dancing the Samba during the latter half of the festival ties back to Candomblé traditions. The full festivities end when the sisters go to the river and make an offering of food and flowers which also is an action rooted in the Candomblé tradition.

== Hierarchy and worship ==
Like all confraternities of Bahia, the Boa Morte has an internal hierarchy that administers the everyday devotions of its members. The leadership is made up of four sisters, responsible for organizing the public festival in August. They are replaced each year. At the top, in the most prominent position of the Irmandade da Boa Morte, is the Perpetual Judge, who is the eldest member. There follow the posts of Attorney General, Provider, Treasurer and Scribe; the first is at the head of religious and profane activities.

=== Novitiate ===
Novices must be attached to a candomblé center in the area—usually Gêge, Ketu or Nagô-Batá—and must profess religious syncretism. They go through an initiation that has a preparatory phase of three years during which they are known as "sisters of the purse" and their vocation is tested. Once they are accepted they can take positions of leadership and rise in the Confraternity's hierarchy every three years.

They all share the tasks of cooking, collecting funds, organizing ceremonial suppers, processions and the funerals of members according to religious precepts and unwritten statutory regulations. Elections are held each year. Votes are cast with grains of corn and beans; the former indicates a nay and the latter a favorable vote. As application of hierarchical differences and the rules regarding each position, all the sisters are on the same footing as servants of Our Lady. Besides being sisters in their devotion to her, they are sometimes sisters in candomblé and are almost always "relatives"—Africans and their descendants in Brazil broadened the concept of kinship to include all those who are of the same nation.

== Syncretism and cultural interchange ==
African ancestry was reworked within Bahian religious institutions and the lay confraternities end up serving this process of cultural intercourse. The belief system has absorbed the values of the dominant culture in a functional and creative way so that, in the name of life, complex processes of syncretism and cultural appropriation take place. One example is the descent of Our Lady herself to the Confraternity every seven years to direct the celebrations in person through the Attorney-General and celebrate among the living the relativity of death. Other examples are found in the symbols of clothing and food, where there is constant reference to the links between this world (Aiyê) and the other (Orun).

== Namesake ==
The Order of the Good Death, a death acceptance organization founded in 2011, took its name from the Order of Our Lady of the Good Death.
