= Oshosi =

Spirit in the Yoruba religion of West Africa

- The hunt; Forests; Warrior; Knowledge; Wilderness; Nature
- Member of Orisha
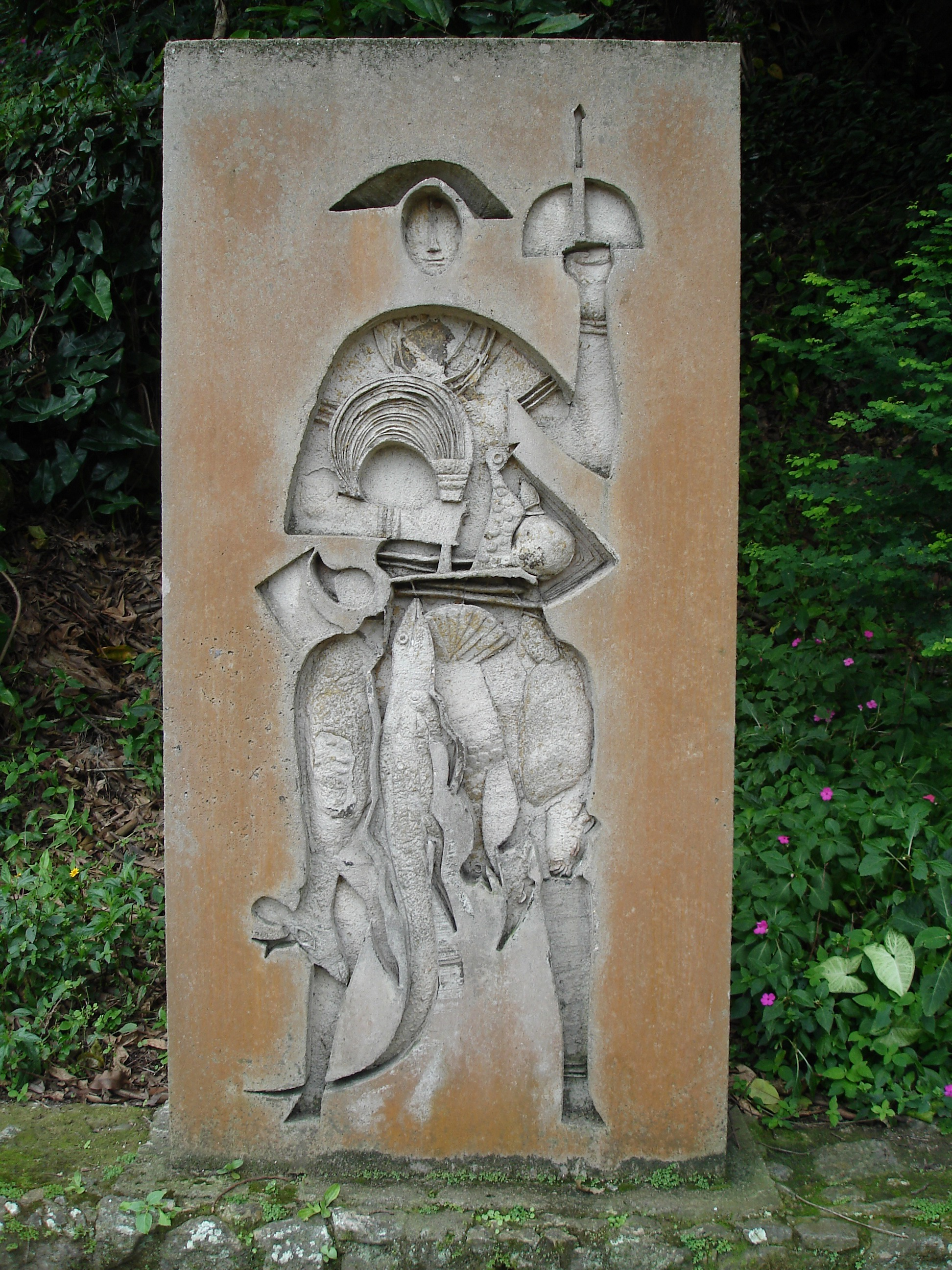
- Oxóssi sculpture at Catacumba Park, Rio de Janeiro, Brazil
- Other names: Oxossi; Ochosi; Ososi; Oxosi; Osawi
- Venerated in: Yoruba religion, Dahomey mythology, Vodun, Santería, Candomblé, Haitian Vodou, Umbanda
- Day: The third day of the Kọjọda week; Thursday
- Region: Nigeria, Benin, Brazil, Haiti
- Ethnic group: Yoruba people

Oshosi (Yoruba: Ọ̀ṣọ́ọ̀sì, Portuguese: Oxóssi) is an Orisha of the Yoruba religion in West Africa and subsequently in Brazil and Cuba.

== Yorùbáland ==
In Yorùbáland and the practice of Ẹ̀sìn Òrìṣà Ìbílẹ̀ -also known as Ìṣẹ̀ṣe Yorùbá- while not as popular as Ògún, Ọ̀ṣọ́ọ̀sì is worshipped in numerous regions, cities, towns, and smaller communities throughout Nigeria, Benin Republic, and Togo.

Areas where Ọ̀ṣọ́ọ̀sì shrines, priests, and devotees are present include:

- various areas of Èkìtì State, such as Emùré-Èkìtì, where he is called "Ẹ̀ṣọ́ùsì" in the Èkìtì dialect of Yorùbá language
- Ìlá Ọ̀ràngún, Ọ̀ṣun State, where he is called "Ọ̀sáòsì" in the Igbóǹnà variety of the Yorùbá language
- Òṣogbo, capital of Ọ̀ṣun State
- Ọ̀yọ́, Ọ̀yọ́ State; here he is called "Ọ̀sọ́ọ̀sì" without the "sh" sound.
- Ìsẹ́yìn, Ọ̀yọ́ State; here he is called "Ọ̀sọ́ọ̀sì" without the "sh" sound.
- many areas of Ìjẹ̀bú and Rẹ́mọ areas of Ògùn State
- Ìmẹ̀kọ, Ìlaràá, Ìdọ̀fà of Ògùn State near the border of Benin Republic; here he is called "Ọ̀ṣọ́ọ̀sìn" or "Ọ̀tchọ́ọ̀sìn."
- Kétu, Ìlíkímu, Ṣábẹ̀ẹ́, etc on the Benin Republic side of Yorùbáland; here he is called "Ọ̀ṣọ́ọ̀sìn" or "Ọ̀tchọ́ọ̀sìn."
- Abẹ́òkúta

...and many other areas.

There is considerable diversity in the worship, insignia of devotees, and other imagery of Ọ̀ṣọ́ọ̀sì throughout Yorùbáland as well as the relationship between Ọ̀ṣọ́ọ̀sì and other òrìṣà. However, the main symbols of Ọ̀ṣọ́ọ̀sì are bow and arrow (ọrun àti ọfà) as he is one of the most important hunter and warrior deities (òrìṣà / imọlẹ̀) of Yorùbá culture.

== Candomblé ==
Oshosi is the spirit associated with the hunt, forests, animals, and wealth. He is spirit of meals, because it is he who provides food. He is associated with lightness, astuteness, wisdom, and craftiness in the hunt. He is the orisa of contemplation, loving the arts and beautiful things. He hunts with a bow and arrow (called an ofá), hunting for good influences and positive energies. Animals sacrificed to Oxóssi rituals are goat, cooked pig, and guinea fowl.

Characteristics:

- Consecrated day: Thursday
- Color: blue in the Ketu nation, otherwise green
- Ritual garment: blue
- Sacred food: axoxô (maize cooked with coconut), black beans, yams, roasted cowpeas (of the subspecies Vigna sinensis)
- Necklace: blue beads
- Archetype: power, domain
- Symbols: bow and arrow

Oxóssi is syncretized with Saint Sebastian in the Rio de Janeiro region, the patron saint of the city. He is associated with Saint George in the Bahia region.

== Santería ==
In Santería, Ochosí is syncretized with Saint Norbert. Oshosi is also syncretized with Saint Hubert: the imagery of St. Hubert has a bow and arrow and a stag next to him which are symbols of Oshosi. Another Catholic saint syncretized with Oshosi in Santeria is Saint Sebastian who is depicted with his body is covered with arrows, another symbol of Oshosi.
