= Mãe Menininha do Gantois =

Brazilian spiritual leader (iyalorixá)

- Born: Maria Escolástica da Conceição Nazaré Assunção; 10 February 1894; Salvador da Bahia, Brazil
- Died: 13 August 1986 (aged 92); Salvador da Bahia, Brazil
- Occupation: Priestess
- Years active: 1946–1986
- Known for: Headed the religious temple of Candomble do Gantois for 64 years

Mãe Menininha do Gantois (10 February 1894 – 13 August 1986) also known as Mother Menininha do Gantois, was a Brazilian spiritual leader (iyalorixá) and spiritual daughter of orixá Oxum, who officiated for 64 years as the head of one of the most noted Candomblé temples, the Ilê Axé Iyá Omin Iyamassê, or Terreiro do Gantois, of Brazil, located in Alto do Gantois in Salvador, Bahia. She was instrumental in gaining legal recognition of Candomblé and its rituals, bringing an end to centuries of prejudice against Afro-Brazilians, who practiced their faith. When she died on 13 August 1986, the State of Bahia declared a three-day state mourning in her honour, and the City Council of Salvador held a special session to pay tributes to her. The Terreiro do Gantois temple has been declared a protected national monument.

== Biography ==
Maria Escolástica da Conceição Nazaré Assunção was born on 10 February 1894 in Salvador, Bahia. Her grand mother, who had baptized her, gave her the nickname as Menininha meaning "little girl." She was born into a matriarchal society to Maria da Glória (Note: Maria da Glória's name is given as both Maria da Glória, Maria da Glória Nazaré, or Maria da Glória Nazareth in multiple sources. This convention is confusing in the context of the Afro-Brazilian matrilineal naming customs. Her grandmother Maria Júlia had two daughters, Pulchéria Maria da Conceição Nazaré and Damiana da Conceição Nazaré. Pulcheria had no children, and Maria da Glória was her niece, thus the daughter of Damiana. Traditionally, her name would be shown as mother's surname, followed by father's surname, or simply as her mother's surname, dropping the father's.) and Joaquim Assunção, who were Afro-Brazilian with Yoruba Nigerian royal ancestry from Egba-Alakê in Abeokutá, a kingdom in the southwestern part of Nigeria. Her great grandparents, Maria Júlia da Conceição do Nazaré and Francisco Nazaré Eta, were the first blacks to be freed from slavery. Maria Júlia's daughter Damiana was the mother of Maria da Glória Nazaré. Menininha was initiated into the worship of deities at the Terreiro do Gantois when she was 8 years old by her grandmother Maria Julia da Conceição Nazaré who had built the temple "Ile Iyá Omi Axé Iyamassê". She was married to Alvaro MacDowell de Oliveira and they had two daughters. The elder daughter was Mãe Cleusa da Conceição Nazaré de Oliveira, born in 1923, who was a doctor and who became the inherited Candomblé priestess of the temple after her mother's death. She died in 1998 and was succeeded by Menininha's other daughter, Mãe Cleusa. As spiritual heads of their temple, all of the Candomblé priestesses receive the honorific 'mãe', which in the Portuguese language means "mother".

== Leadership of Terreiro do Gantois ==
The temple, which she headed, was established by her grandmother Mãe Pulquéria following a dispute over leadership from Engenho Velho, an older temple said to be one of the oldest Candomblé temples (1830 or even 100 years older) in Bahia, which had been built by three freed African women. Two temples were built, one was the Terreiro do Gantois, built in 1900 by Mãe Pulquéria, and the other was Ile Axe Opo Afonja, credited to Mãe Aninha.. The Terreiro do Gantois over time developed into one of the most prominent houses of the Ketu tradition of Candomblé. Scholars of Afro-Brazilian religion have emphasized that such temples were often led by powerful female priestesses, who played central roles in maintaining religious authority and community organization within Candomblé. Following the death of Mãe Pulquéria in 1918 and subsequent succession changes within the temple hierarchy, due to the death of Maria da Glória Nazaré in 1920; Menininha was selected to become the head priestess in 1922. She remained the spiritual leader of the community until her death in 1986.

During her leadership, the temple became an important religious and cultural center in Salvador, attracting practitioners, scholars, and visitors interested in Afro-Brazilian religious traditions. This prominence also reflected broader patterns within the Afro-Atlantic world, where Candomblé developed through transnational exchanges of culture, religion, and identity.

== Career ==
Once chosen and confirmed to the temple of Terreiro do Gantois in 1922, Menininha became the head of the Candomblé do Gantois. She dedicated her life to the temple and for the cause of the African religion of Candomblé, which represented to her the "last stronghold of the black dignity". She faced persecution at the hands of the Brazilian government and even incarceration, as well as being subjected to harassment. She defended the African-Brazilian traditions of worship at the Terreiro do Gantois and other Terreiros at Engenho Velho and Casa Branca. Her struggle, in association with other well known candomblé priestesses like Stella de Oxossi, asserted the Africanness of Candombé, stressing the fact that their religion was not the same as Roman Catholicism.

One of the reasons she became prominent was that she initiated hundreds of "daughters" into the faith, as well as artists, and invited the academic community to study the roots of the religion. This engagement with scholars reflected a broader tradition in which Candomblé communities became important sites of anthropological study, particularly regarding gender, race, and religious authority. One of those academics, Ruth Landes compiled her findings and published a book, City of Women (1947) discussing how the racial policies of the government were intertwined with the Candomblé religious rites. Antônio Carlos Magalhães, a powerful senator from Bahia; Carybé, the artist; and Edson Carneiro and Pierre Verger, anthropologists who studied Afro-Brazilian communities, were also prominent connections used by Menininha to further study and promote the validity of Candomblé. These studies were influential in furthering research on the Nigerian roots of the religion, but at the same time brought criticism from other temples in the faith that Menininha was exploiting the religion. However, her success in obtaining legalization of the religion in the 1970s facilitated the first freedom to practice their faith in hundreds of years and began the process of eliminating prejudice against other Afro-Brazilian faiths.

== Advocacy and legal recognition of Candomblé ==
Many practitioners and leaders of Candomble, such as Mãe Menininha, often faced harassment, police surveillance, and legal restrictions in Brazil during the early and mid-twentieth century. Religious ceremonies sometimes required authorization from authorities, and terreiros were subject to raids and confiscation of ritual objects.

As leader of the Terreiro do Gantois, Mãe Menininha became one of the more prominent figures advocating for the social and legal recognition of Afro-Brazilian religious practices, like Candomblé. She is often referred to as one of the most influential Candomblé priestesses of the twentieth century, and scholars often credit her with helping expand the visibility and legitimacy of the religion in Brazilian society.. Scholars have also noted that during the twentieth century Candomblé gradually moved from a persecuted practice to a symbol of Bahian cultural identity, a transformation in which influential priestesses such as Menininha played an important role. This shift occurred alongside growing public interest in Afro-Brazilian culture and its connections to the dispersal of Africans across South America as a result of the Trans-Atlantic slave trade.

Menininha also encouraged academic research and cultural exchange at the Gantois temple, welcoming anthropologists, artists, and intellectuals who were interested in studying Afro-Brazilian religion. This openness helped promote the recognition of Candomblé in broader cultural and scholarly discussions about Brazilian identity and heritage.Over time, this increased visibility contributed to the public legitimization of the religion and the recognition of important terreiros as sites of cultural heritage. The growing public acceptance of Candomblé during Menininha’s leadership marked a shift from earlier decades of persecution toward recognition of Afro-Brazilian religious traditions as an important component of Brazil’s cultural and historical landscape.

== Legacy ==
Menininha died at the age of 92 on 13 August 1986. At the special session held in the City Council of Salvador to commemorate her death, Edvaldo Britto, Deputy Mayor; Pedro Godinho, President of the House; her friends; and Mabel Veloso attended. Veloso paid tribute to the mother by highlighting her role as the priestess in leading the resistance and fighting against discrimination and religious faith. Her successor to the temple was her daughter Cleusa, who was chosen as priestess in 1989. Upon Cleusa's death, the deities chose her younger sister, Mãe Carmem de Òsàlá to succeed her. Menininha became a symbol of motherhood and spiritual daughter of the Orixa Oxum. Her ritual chair, which appears like a throne, is placed at the entry to the city museum in Salvador.

== Poems ==
Many songs have been written: prayer songs seeking her blessings and spiritual guidance. Beth Carvalho, a famous singer, paid tribute to her in his composition titled 'O Encanto do Gantois, in 1985. One of these poems reads:

Prayer to Mother Menininha
Oh my mother
My Mother Menininha
Oh my mother
The little girl Gantois
The most beautiful star,
huh? It's in the Gantois
And the brightest sun,
huh? It's in the Gantois
The beauty of the world,
huh? It's in the Gantois
And the hand of sweetness,
huh? It's in the Gantois
The comfort us, eh? It's in the Gantois
And Oshun more beautiful, huh? It's in the Gantois
Olorun who sent
This daughter of Oshun
Take care of us
And all that is
Olorun who sent ô ô
Now yeh yeh ô ...
Now yeh yeh ô

== Bibliography ==
- Adinolfi, Maria Pia; Van de Port, Mattijs (2013). "Bed and Throne: The 'Museumification' of the Living Quarters of a Candomblé Priestess". Material Religion. 9 (3): 282–303. doi:10.2752/175183413X13673422902773.
- Appiah, Anthony; Gates, Henry Louis (2005). Africana: The Encyclopedia of the African and African American Experience. Oxford University Press. ISBN 978-0-19-517055-9.
- Bay, Edna G.; Mann, Kristin (2013). Rethinking the African Diaspora: The Making of a Black Atlantic World in the Bight of Benin and Brazil. New York, New York: Taylor & Francis. ISBN 978-1-135-31073-8.
- Henry, Clarence Bernard (17 February 2010). Let's Make Some Noise: Axé and the African Roots of Brazilian Popular Music. Univ. Press of Mississippi. ISBN 978-1-60473-334-1.
- Jestice, Phyllis G. (2004). Holy People of the World: A Cross-cultural Encyclopedia. Santa Barbara, California: ABC-CLIO. ISBN 978-1-57607-355-1.
- Johnson, Paul Christopher (17 July 2002). Secrets, Gossip, and Gods : The Transformation of Brazilian Candomble: The Transformation of Brazilian Candomble. New York, New York: Oxford University Press, USA. ISBN 978-0-19-803429-2.
- Parés, Luis Nicolau; Sansi, Roger (2011). Sorcery in the Black Atlantic. Chicago, Illinois: University of Chicago Press. ISBN 978-0-226-64578-0.
- Van de Port, Mattijs (2011). Ecstatic Encounters, Bahian Candomble and The Quest For The Really Real. Leiden: Amsterdam University Press. ISBN 9789089642981.
