= Candomblé Ketu =

Candomblé nation

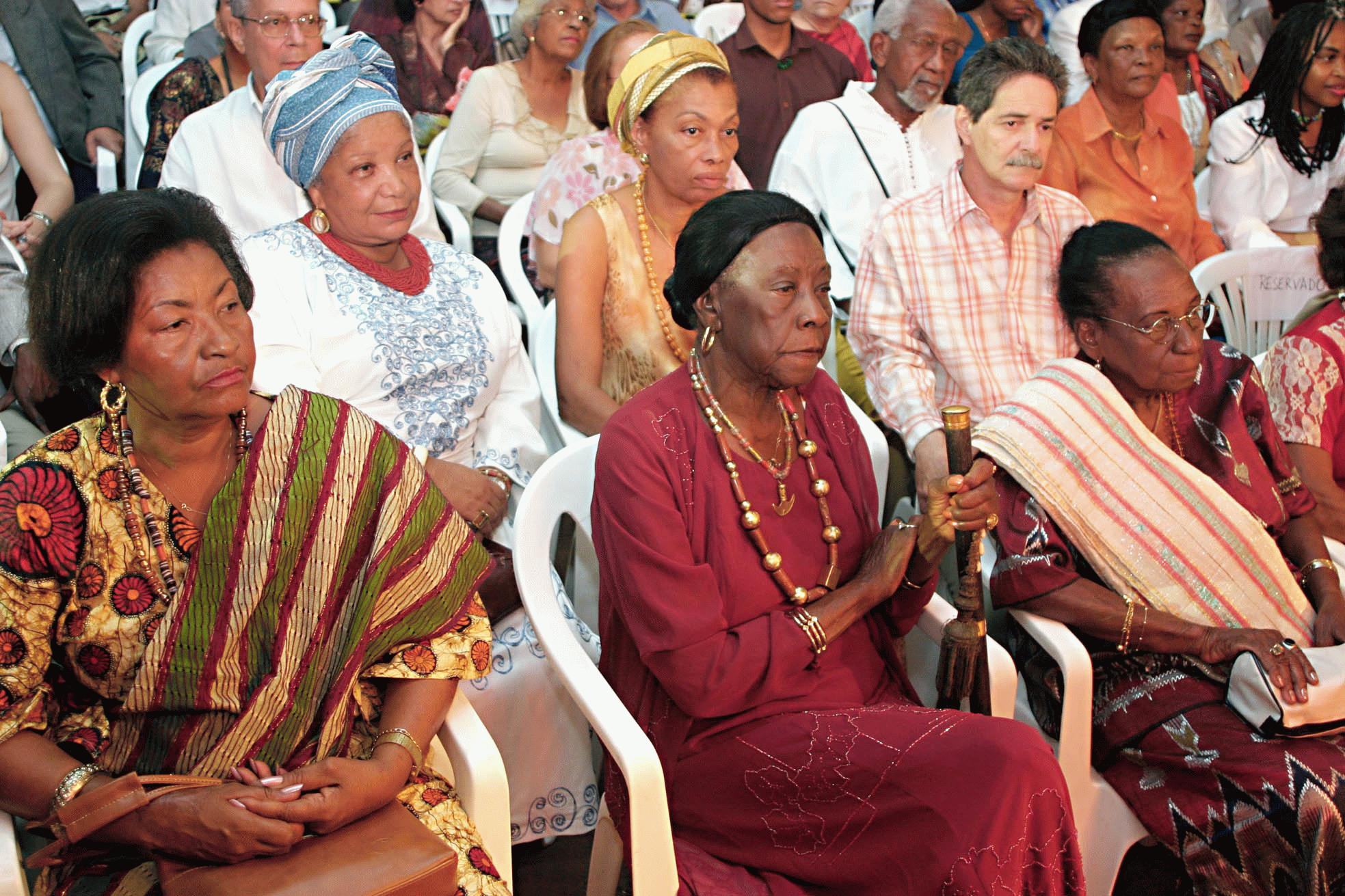
- Candomblé priestesses in Brazil
- Type: Afro-Diasporic
- Classification: Afro-Brazilian
- Theology: Combination of Yoruba religion from various different Yoruban provinces and communities encountered in Diaspora, especially in Bahia.
- Associations: Order of Our Lady of the Good Death; Order of Our Lord of the Martyrdom

Candomblé Ketu (or Queto in Portuguese) is the largest and most influential branch (nation) of Candomblé, a religion practiced primarily in Brazil. The word Candomblé means "ritual dancing or gather in honor of gods" and Ketu is the name of the Ketu region of Benin. Its liturgical language, known as yorubá or Nagô, is a dialect of Yoruba. Candomblé Ketu developed in the early 19th century and gained great importance to Brazilian heritage in the 20th century.

== History ==
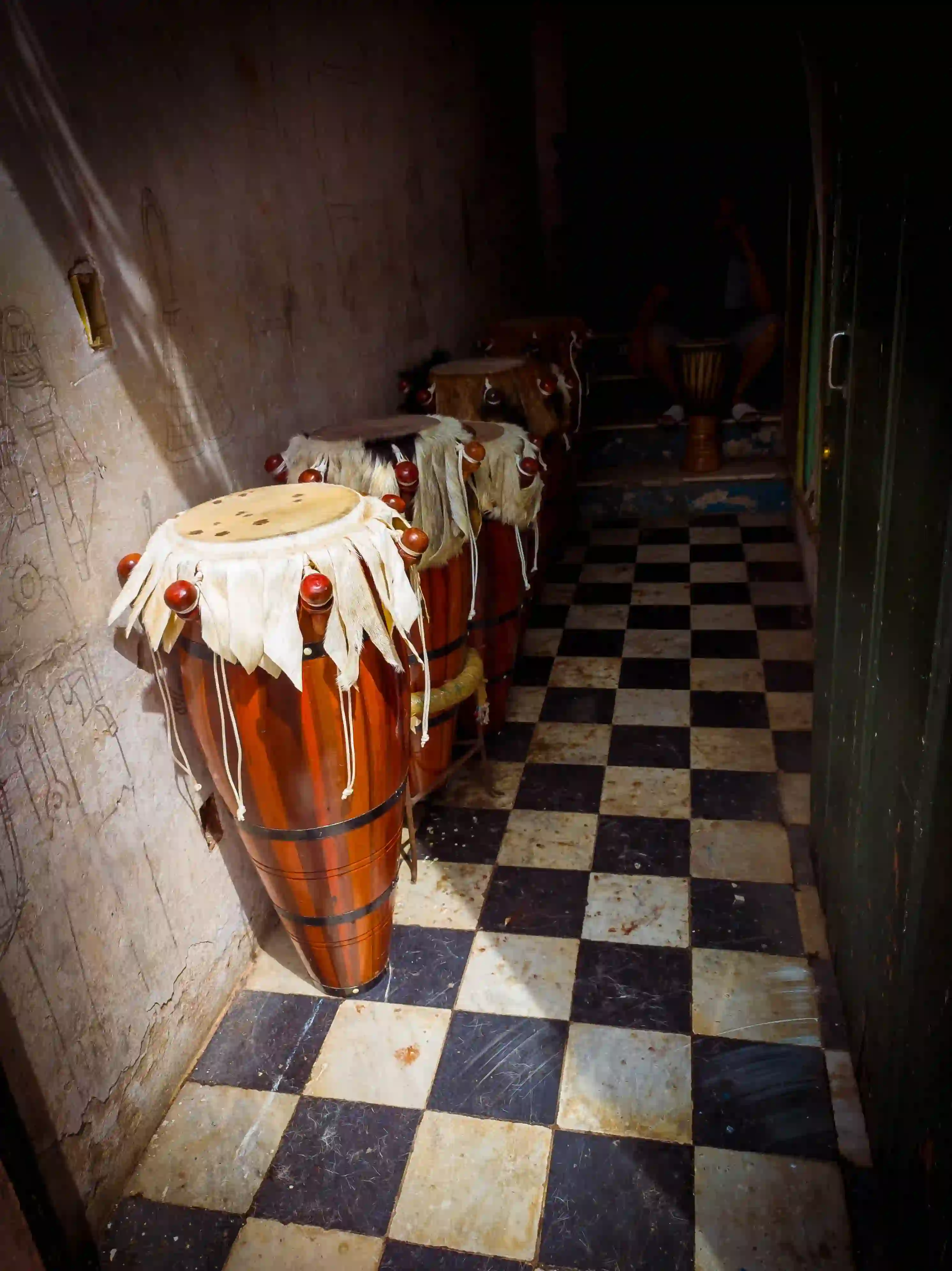
Atabaques used in Candomblé - Made by Mestre Dinho

Queto is a system of beliefs that merges the Yoruba religion (brought to the New World by Yoruba slaves) with different influences of other African Communities within Brazil, especially Bahia, where the Ala-Queto Nation is most prevalent. Queto developed in the Portuguese Empire. Yoruba slaves carried with them various religious customs, including a trance and divination system for communicating with their ancestors and spirits, animal sacrifice, and sacred drumming and dance. The religion grew popular among slaves because it was a way for Yoruba slaves to maintain their culture and express independence.

Its origins are entwined with the religious and beneficent brotherhoods (irmandades) organized by the Roman Catholic Church among ethnic Yoruba, Jeje and Bantu enslaved people; the Order of Our Lady of the Good Death (Nossa Senhora da Boa Morte), for women, and the Order of Our Lord of the Martyrdom (Nosso Senhor dos Martírios), for men.

Numerous terreiros of the Ketu branch of Candomblé have received historic status and government protection from the National Institute of Historic and Artistic Heritage (IPHAN). Ilê Axé Iyá Nassô Oká in Salvador was the first non-Roman Catholic and first Afro-Brazilian religious place of worship to receive protected heritage status in Brazil. Ilê Odó Ogé, also known as Terreiro Pilão de Prata, has protected heritage status from the state of Bahia.

== Religious practices ==
As the largest branch of the Candomblé religion, Ketu origins have a major influence on the religion as a whole. Although there are various branches of Candomblé, the foundational beliefs are the same. They differ based on names, songs, and rituals primarily due to no written scripture. Each branch possesses a unique deity under the Supreme god Olódùmarè who is seen as unequaled and beyond all existence. Ketu's deities are called Orixá. Orixá control the destiny of the people and act as a guardian. Orixá also represent different forces in nature, foods, colors, animals, and days of the week.

In Ketu, Candomblé storytelling and animal sacrifices are important. Storytelling is expected to be done in a clear and precise way in order to be passed down to further generations. Animals such as pigs, goats, cows, sheep, and chicken are often sacrificed. Animals are seen as sacred, so they are often sacrificed as a way to transfer energy between nature, humans, and the Orixá.

== Catholic resistance ==
There was a great deal of Catholic resistance due to the belief that the religion was devil's work. Slaves often incorporated front Catholic Saints in order to keep their practices a secret. Catholics wanted slaves to convert to their religion and feared retaliation if slaves became too independent.

== Pantheon ==
- Olorum (Supreme Being)
- Exu
- Ogum
- Oxóssi
- Oxum
- Oxalufã
- Oxaguiã
- Orixá Okô
- Olissá
- Orunmilá
- Xangô
- Ayrá
- Iemanjá
- Ossãe
- Oyá
- Obaluaiê
- Omolu
- Jagun
- Nanã Buruku
- Oxumarê
- Obá
- Ewá
- Ibêji
- Logun Edé
- Iroko
- Olorokê
- Apaoká
- Iyami Oxorongá
- Egungun (the ancestors)

== See also ==
- African diaspora religions
- Ifá
- Santería
