= Mãe-de-santo =

Brazilian priestess

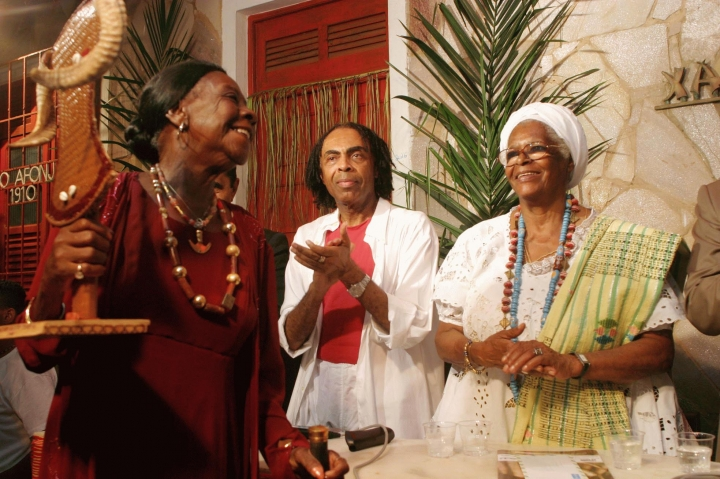
Candomblean Iyalorishás Olga de Alaketu and Stella de Oxóssi with Gilberto Gil, a Brazilian singer and former Minister of Culture.

A mãe-de-santo or mãe de santo (Portuguese pronunciation: [ˈmɐ̃j d(ʒi) ˈsɐ̃tu], plural mães de santo [ˈmɐ̃js d(ʒi) ˈsɐ̃tu]) is a priestess of Candomblé, Umbanda and Quimbanda, the Afro-Brazilian religions. Those Portuguese words mean literally "saint's mother", a calque of the Yoruba word iyalorisha, a title given to female leaders of the Yoruba religion. Iya means "mother", and the contraction l'orisha means "of orisha", adapted into Portuguese as "of saint" due to the traditionally Catholic-centric culture that surrounds that language.

The priestesses are more venerated in African-Brazilian religions than the priests, who are called pais-de-santo. In the Afro-Brazilian religions, the priestesses and priests are seen as the owners of tradition, knowledge and culture; it is their responsibility to pass those on to the new generations, because there is no religious text to use for the record.

== See also ==
- Iyalawo
- Mãe Judith
- Pai-de-santo
