= Sunga (disambiguation) =

Sunga, or the Shunga Empire, was an Indian empire of the 2nd and 1st century BCE.

Sunga may also refer to:

- Sunga (caste), a Hindu caste from Rajasthan
- Sunga (swimsuit), a Brazilian style of swimwear
- Sunga, Bhopal, a village in Madhya Pradesh, India
- Pushyamitra Shunga, or Sunga (c. 185–149 BCE), founder of the Shunga Empire

== See also ==
- Shunga (disambiguation)
