= Shunga (disambiguation) =

Shunga is a type of Japanese erotic art.

Shunga may also refer to:

- Shunga Empire or Śuṅga Empire, an Indian empire of the 2nd and 1st century BCE
  - Pushyamitra Shunga, the founder of the Shunga empire
- Shunga (Karelia), a village in Russia's Republic of Karelia

== See also ==
- Sunga (disambiguation)
- Shungite, a mineraloid named after the village in Karelia
