= Umbanda =

Afro-Brazilian syncretic religion

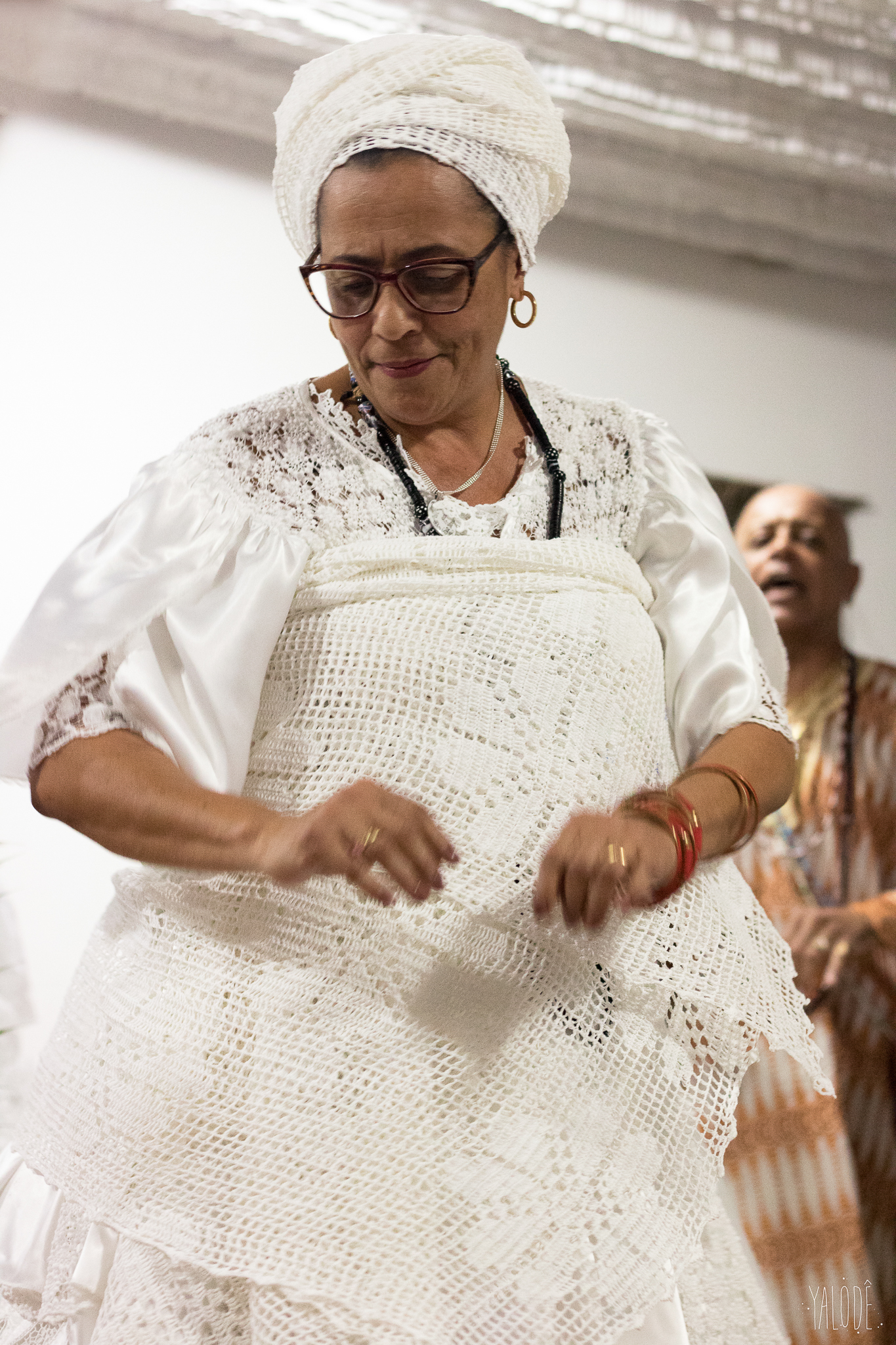
An Umbandista wearing the white clothing typically worn in the religion's ceremonies

Umbanda (Portuguese pronunciation: [ũˈbɐ̃dɐ]) is a religion that emerged in Brazil during the 1920s. It draws elements from Spiritism, Afro-Brazilian traditions like Candomblé, and Roman Catholicism. There is no central authority in control of Umbanda, which is organized around autonomous places of worship termed centros or terreiros, the followers of which are called Umbandistas.

Adherents of this monotheistic religion believe in a single God who is distant from humanity. Beneath this entity are powerful non-human spirits called orixás. In the more Spiritist-oriented wing of the religion, White Umbanda, these are viewed as divine energies or forces of nature; in more Africanised forms they are seen as West African deities and are offered animal sacrifices. The emissaries of the orixás are the pretos velhos and caboclos, spirits of enslaved Africans and of indigenous Brazilians respectively, and these are the main entities dealt with by Umbandistas. At Umbandist rituals, spirit mediums sing and dance in the hope of channeling these spirits, through whom the congregations receive guidance, advice, and healing. Umbanda teaches a complex cosmology involving a system of reincarnation according to the law of karma. The religion's ethics emphasise charity and social fraternity. Umbandistas also seek to reverse harm that they attribute to practitioners of a related tradition, Quimbanda.

Roman Catholicism was the dominant religion in early 20th-century Brazil, but sizeable minorities practiced Afro-Brazilian traditions or Spiritism, a French version of Spiritualism developed by Allan Kardec. Around the 1920s, various groups may have been combining Spiritist and Afro-Brazilian practices, forming the basis of Umbanda. The most important group was that established by Zélio Fernandino de Moraes and those around him in Niterói, Rio de Janeiro. He had been involved in Spiritism but disapproved of the negative attitude that many Spiritists held towards contact with pretos velhos and caboclos. Reflecting Umbanda's growth, in 1939 de Moraes formed an Umbandist federation and in 1941 held the first Umbandist congress. Umbanda gained increased social recognition and respectability amid the military dictatorship of 1964 to 1985, despite growing opposition from both the Roman Catholic Church and Pentecostal groups. Since the 1970s, Umbanda has seen some decline due to the resurgent popularity of Candomblé.

In Brazil, hundreds of thousands of people formally identify as Umbandistas, but the number who attend Umbandist ceremonies, sometimes on an occasional basis, is in the millions. In its heyday of the 1960s and 1970s, Umbanda was estimated to have between 10 and 20 million followers in Brazil. Reflecting a universalist attitude, practitioners are typically permitted to also follow other religious traditions. Umbanda is found primarily in urban areas of southern Brazil although has spread throughout the country and to other parts of the Americas.

== Definitions ==
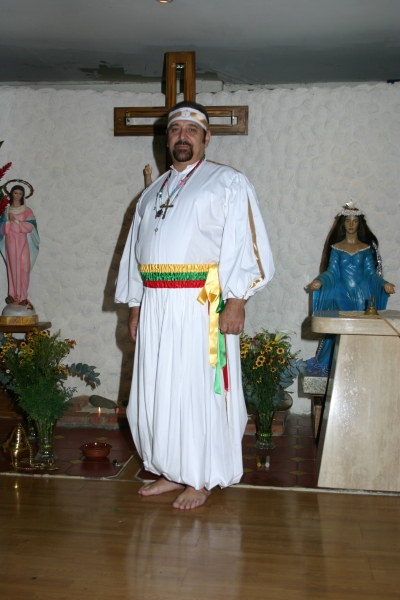
An Umbandista dressed in ritual attire

Formed in the state of Rio de Janeiro during the 1920s, Umbanda combines elements of Spiritism (Espiritismo) with ideas from Afro-Brazilian religions like Candomblé. Additional influences come from Roman Catholicism, as well as Asian religions like Hinduism and Buddhism. The religion's practitioners are called Umbandistas, while the term Umbanda itself may derive from the Portuguese language terms uma banda, meaning "one group".

Umbanda is not a unified religion, having no central institutional authority, and being transmitted in a largely oral manner. It displays considerable variation and eclecticism, being highly adaptable, and taking various different forms. Much of this variation is regional. Several scholars deem it appropriate to talk about "Umbandas", in the plural, as much as a singular Umbanda. Reflecting a general universalist stance that encourages tolerance towards other traditions, Umbandistas are commonly permitted to also pursue other religions, with some also practising Roman Catholicism, Judaism, or Santo Daime.

Reflecting its Spiritist origins, Umbanda has been labelled a Western esoteric tradition. It has also been called an Afro-Brazilian religion, although the scholar of religion Steven Engler cautioned that Africanised ritual elements are not present in all Umbandist groups and that the Spiritist influence is more significant across Umbanda as a whole. There are also Umbandist groups that have adopted Kabbalah, or New Age practices.

=== Relation to Afro-Brazilian religions ===
Umbandist groups exist on a spectrum, from those emphasising Spiritist connections to those stressing links with Candomblé and related Afro-Brazilian religions. Groups taking the former position often refer to themselves as practicing Umbanda branca ("White Umbanda"), Umbanda pura ("Pure Umbanda"), or Umbanda limpa ("Clean Umbanda"). The anthropologist Lindsay Hale referred to the more Africanist wing as "Afro-Brazilian Umbanda", while fellow anthropologist Diana Brown called it "Africanized Umbanda". Most Umbandist groups exist at points between these two poles.

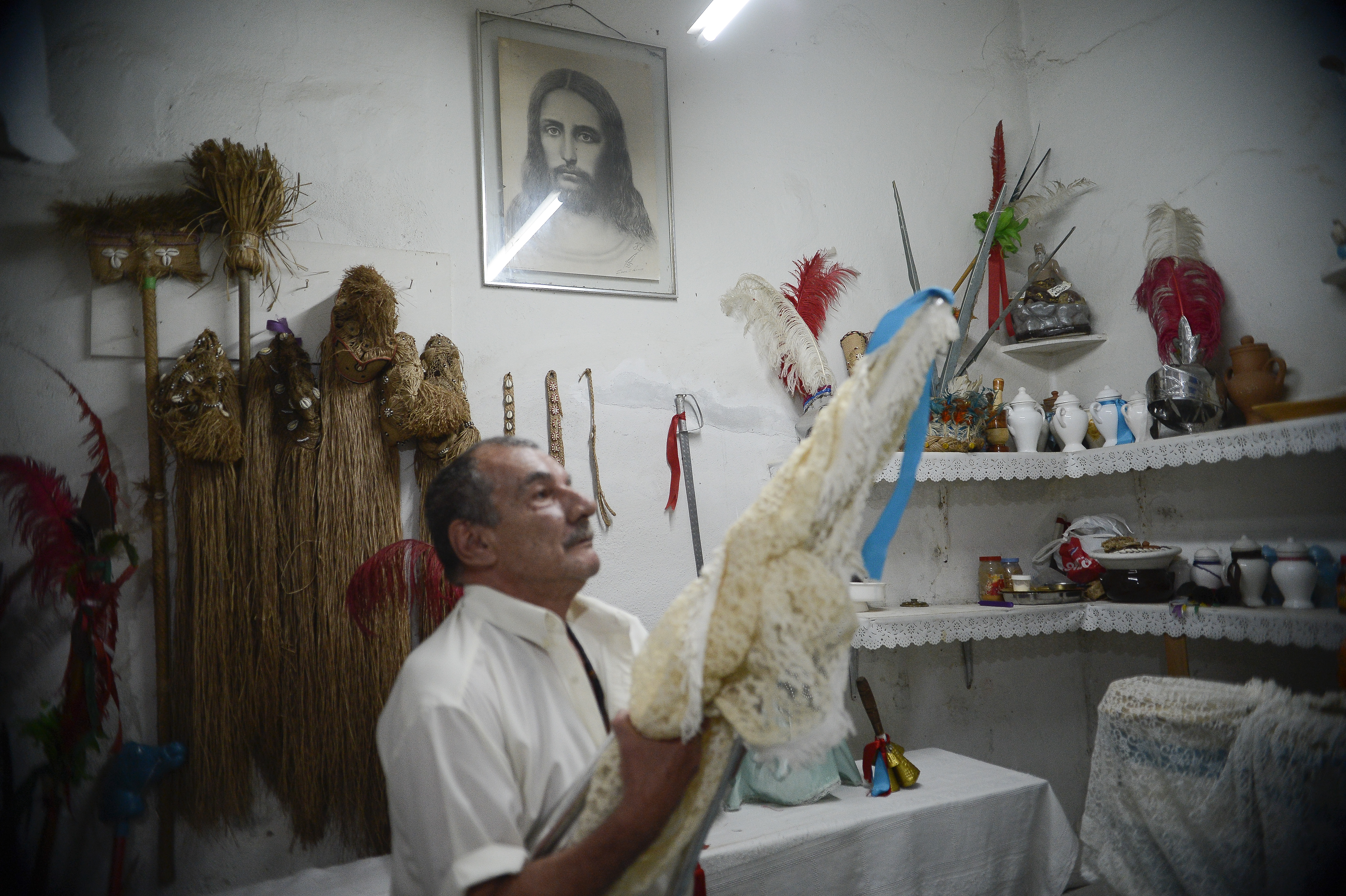
An Umbandist centro in Rio de Janeiro

In practice, Afro-Brazilian religions often mix, rather than existing in pure forms, and thus scholars see them as existing on a continuum rather than being firmly distinct from each other. Brown noted that the boundary separating Umbanda from Candomblé was largely "a matter of individual opinion". She added that there was "no general consensus" as to what exactly Umbanda is and what it is not. In Rio de Janeiro, a tradition called Omolocô was established as an intermediate religion between Candomblé and Umbanda. Groups combining elements of Umbanda and Candomblé are sometimes termed "Umbandomblé", although this is rarely embraced by practitioners themselves. In the Porto Alegre area, it is common for groups to mix Umbanda with the Afro-Brazilian religion Batuque.

Outsiders sometimes refer to Umbanda as Macumba, a pejorative term for Afro-Brazilian religions. While some Umbandistas have referred to themselves as macumbeiros, often in jest due to the term's negative connotations, Umbandist literature usually uses Macumba in a more restrictive sense to designate baixa espiritismo (low spiritism), traditions that work with lesser spirits for morally questionable purposes. Umbandistas often describe these practices as Quimbanda and emphasise their opposition to them, maintaining that Umbandistas work for good while Quimbandistas work for evil. The boundaries between Umbanda and Quimbanda are nevertheless not always clear, with various spirit mediums engaging or promoting practices associated with both. The anthropologist David J. Hess called the two religions "siblings".

== Beliefs ==
Various Umbandistas have claimed that theirs is not a new religion but an ancient tradition brought to Brazil from elsewhere. Some practitioners have claimed that it derives from ancient Egypt, India, or China, or from the Aztecs or Incas. Others have maintained that Umbanda's origins are either extraterrestrial or from Atlantis. These sorts of origin stories reflect the influence of Theosophy. Brown suggested that these explanations were adopted by Umbandistas eager to dismiss the possibility of their religion having Sub-Saharan African origin. In contrast, various practitioners of Africanised forms of Umbanda have maintained that the religion originally came from Africa.

=== Theology and cosmology ===
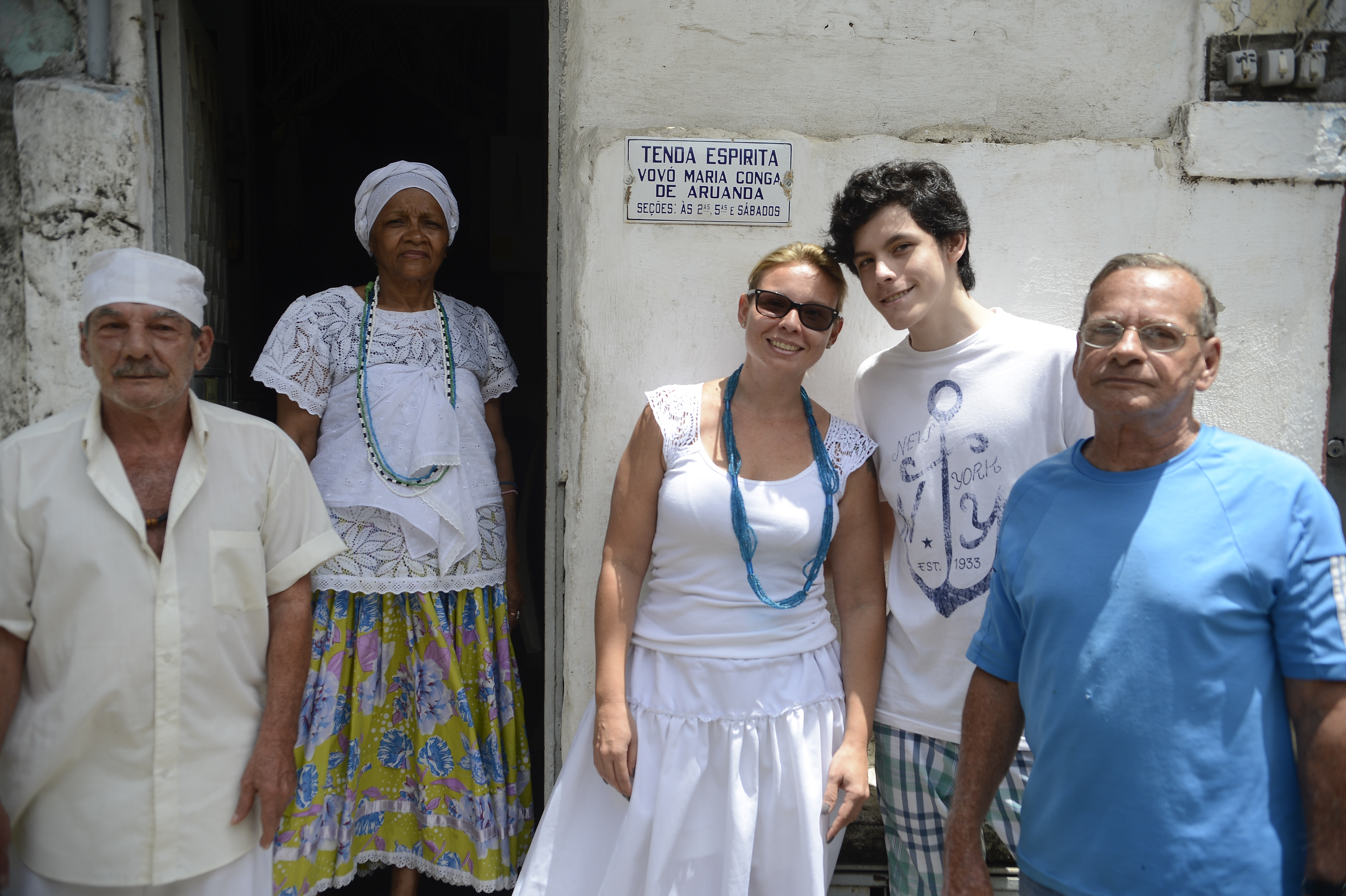
A group of Umbandistas in Rio de Janeiro

Umbanda is monotheistic. It believes in a single God who is the creator and controller of the universe, an entity that presides over the astral world but who is distant from humanity. He is sometimes called Olorun, a name of Yoruba origin. Beneath God is a pantheon of spirits that reflect syncretic origins, assembled into what Brown called "a complex, impersonal bureaucracy", and it is these entities thought to intervene in humanity's daily lives.

Although it has no authoritative source ensuring a standardised cosmological belief among practitioners, Umbanda has an elaborate cosmology. An important distinction is made between the material and the spiritual, with the latter considered far superior. Umbandist theology is largely Spiritist in basis, adopting the Spiritist emphasis on reincarnation and spiritual evolution, as well as the hierarchical ranking of spirits according to their "degree of evolution".

Many Umbandistas believe in a three-part cosmos, divided between the astral spaces, the earth, and the underworld. The more highly evolved spirits dwell in the astral realm, spirits incarnated in physical form reside temporarily on earth, while malevolent and ignorant spirits inhabit the underworld. The barrier between these worlds is not impenetrable; spirits from both the astral and underworld realms can visit the earth. Umbandistas often refer to the plano astral (astral plane) as the além (beyond). Sometimes, the realm of the evolved spirits is also called Aruanda, a term that likely derives from Luanda, a port in modern Angola, but which in Umbanda has looser connotations of an area within the astral plane.

The astral world is deemed to be divided into a hierarchy of seven vertical levels, the Sête Linhas de Umbanda (Seven Lines of Umbanda), although the specific identity of each line varies among Umbandistas. This seven-fold division may derive from Theosophy. Each of the Seven Lines is governed by an orixá, a highly evolved spirit who will also have an identity as a Roman Catholic saint. The underworld is also divided into Seven Lines, each of which is led by an exú spirit. Each Line is also internally divided into seven sub-lines; each of these is then divided into seven legions; these divide into seven sub-legions; these into seven falanges (phalanges); and these into seven sub-falanges. Umbandistas often liken this cosmological structure to the organization of an army, and it may reflect the prominent role that various military figures have played in Umbanda's history. The spirits inhabiting these groups are usually arranged on the basis of regional or racial origin.

=== Orixás ===
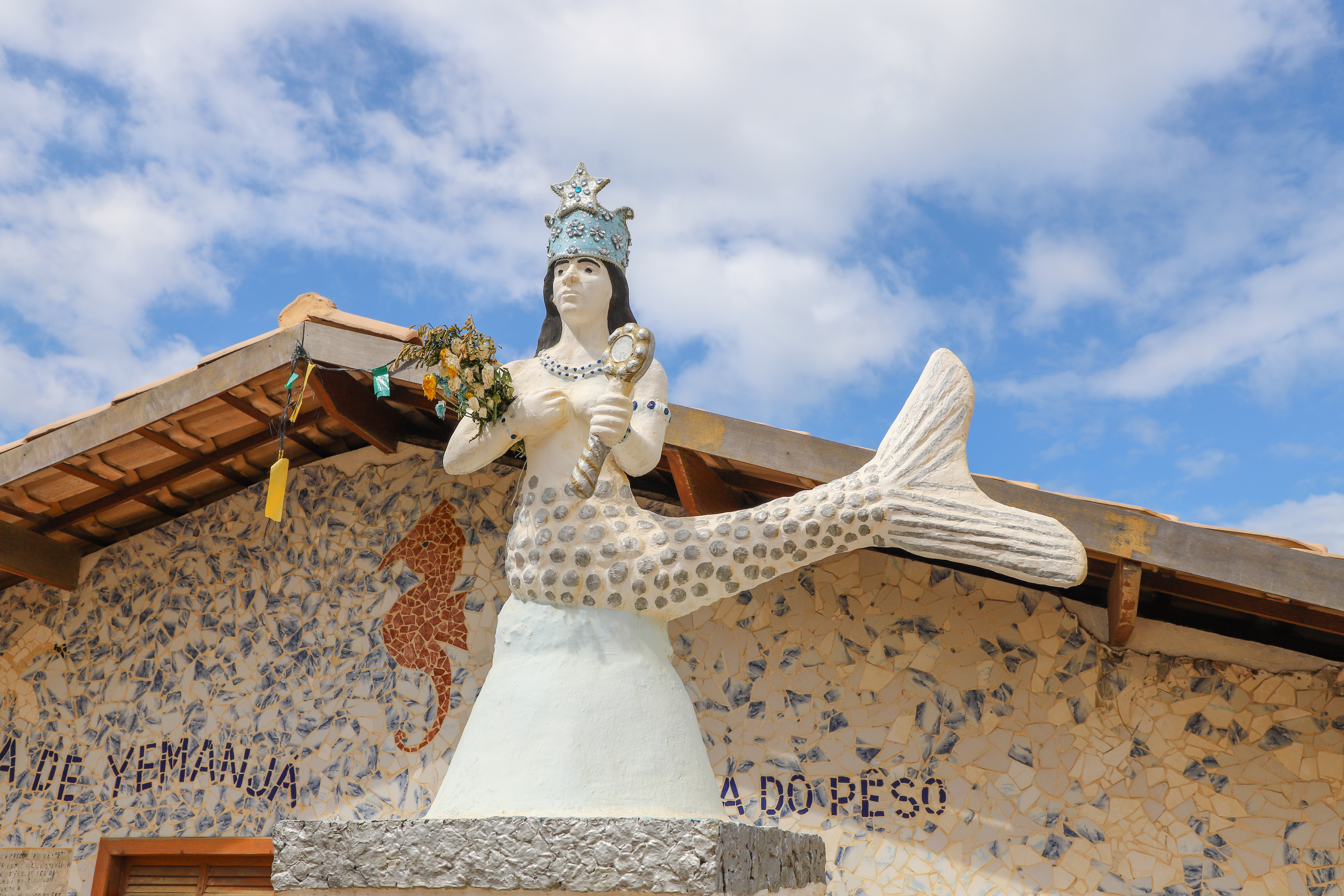
A statue of Iemanjá in Salvador

At the top of Umbanda's hierarchy of spirits are the orixás, entities often regarded as deities. The term orixá derives from the Yoruba language of West Africa, as do the names of the various orixás themselves, which in Brazil are also employed in the Nagô or Ketu tradition of Candomblé. Although the names of the orixás are drawn from Candomblé, Umbandistas do not typically interpret these beings in the same way that Candomblé's practitioners do. There is nevertheless variation according to group; African-oriented Umbandistas place particular emphasis on the orixás, while they remain far less important in the rituals of White Umbandist groups.

For Umbandistas, the orixás are God's intermediaries, and represent elemental forces of nature as well as humanity's primary economic activities. White Umbandist groups often perceive the orixás primarily as frequencies of spiritual energy, vibrations, or forces. They are regarded as beings so highly evolved that they have never incarnated in physical form. Like God, they are distant from humanity, permanently residing on the astral plane. Many Umbandistas rarely expect orixás to manifest during rituals, for the orixás are preoccupied with important spiritual matters. They are also thought too powerful for many humans to handle, meaning that their manifestation could be dangerous for the ritual's participants. Instead, the orixás send their emissaries, the caboclos and pretos velhos, to appear in their place.

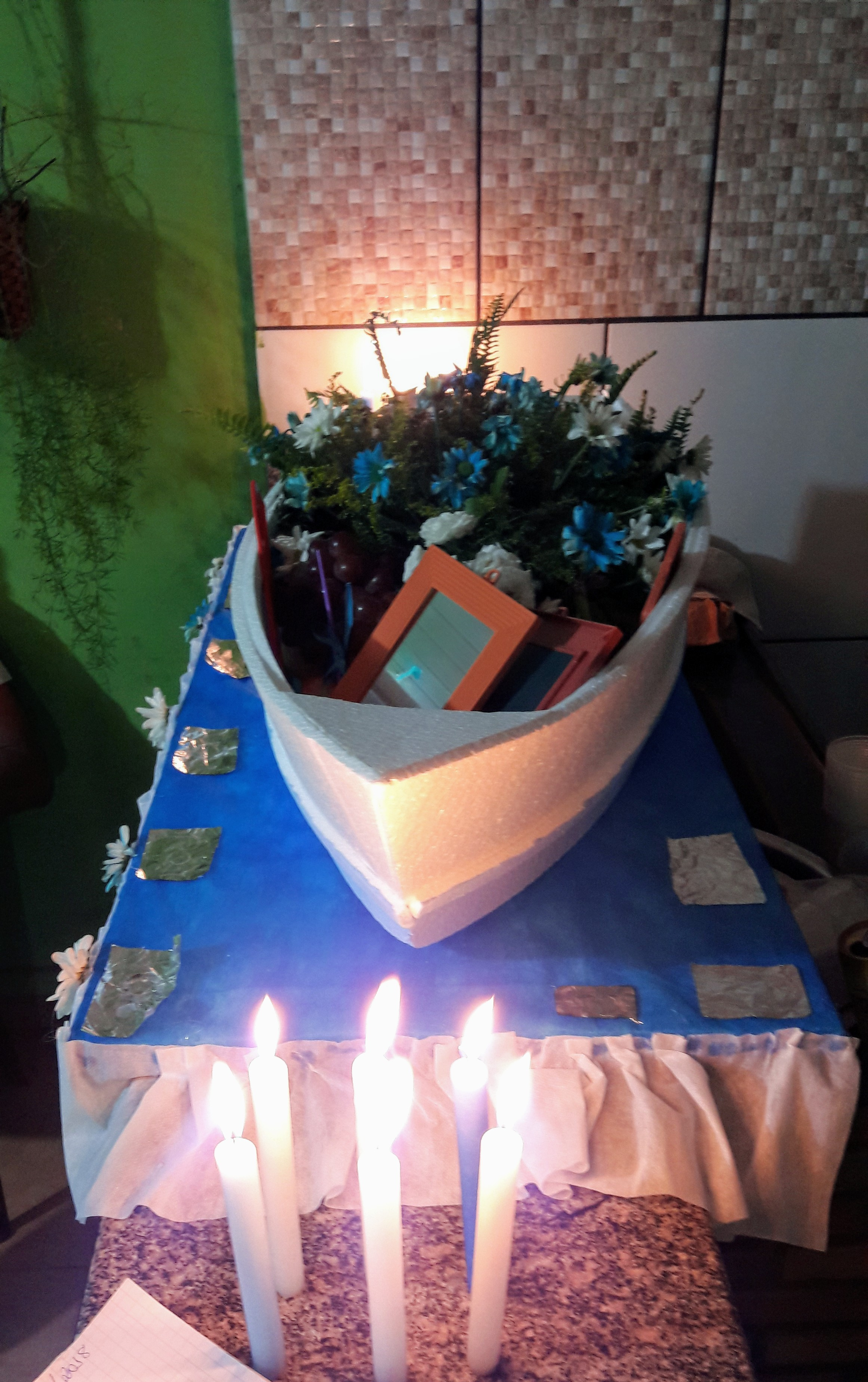
An offering to Iemanjá

Nine orixás are commonly found in Umbanda, fewer than the 16 more usually present in Candomblé. The son of Olorun, Oxalá is associated with the sky and regarded as the creator of humanity. Iemanjá is a maternal figure associated with the sea. Nanã is also a maternal figure associated with water, but in her case the waters of the lake and swamp. Omolu is the orixá of sickness and healing. Xangô is linked to thunder and lightning, as well as to stone working and quarrying. Ogúm is the orixá of war, metalworking, agriculture, and transportation. Oxúm is associated with fertility and with flowing water, especially streams and waterfalls. Iansã is a female warrior who manifests in storms. Oxóssi is a hunter who lives in the forest. Exú is a trickster and the guardian of the crossroads, being the intermediary between the orixás and humanity. He will often be paid homage first during a ritual, to stop him being disruptive later in the rite.

Each of the orixás is deemed to have their own desires and emotions. The orixás are also associated with particular colors; Oxúm with blue, for instance, and Oxóssi with green. Each is also linked to particular days of the week; Iansã with Wednesday, and Nanã with Tuesday, for example. They are also associated with a particular celestial body, such as Xangô with the planet Jupiter and Iemanjá with the moon.

Each orixá is typically associated with a Roman Catholic saint. It is in this form that they are often represented on Umbandist altars, and these links are also reinforced in praise songs. Xangô, for instance, is often identified with Saint Geronimo, Nanã with Saint Anne, and Omolu with Saint Roch and Saint Lazarus. Many Umbandistas identify Exú with the Devil of Christian theology, and Oxalá with Jesus Christ. There is often regional variation in these associations; in Rio de Janeiro, Iemanjá is typically linked to Our Lady of Glory, while in Salvador she is associated with Our Lady of the Conception. There are nevertheless differences of opinion among Umbandistas as to the nature of the relationship between orixás and saints. Many Umbandistas regard the orixás and saints as manifestations of the same spiritual force rather than being exactly the same figure; some practitioners believe that these saints were once humans who were physical manifestations of the orixás.

==== Relationships with the orixás ====
Umbanda often teaches that each person has a coroa (crown) of protective spirit entities. The most important of these is the orixá da frente ("the front orixá"), an orixá deemed to be that individual's spiritual parent. These entities are a person's protectors and patrons. They are also deemed to influence that individual's personality traits. Umbandistas believe that these entities are deserving of respect and that treating them well will improve a person's life. In Umbanda, it is usual for a medium to personally determine the identity of a person's spirit patrons. This is different from Candomblé, where the identity is more often ascertained through forms of divination; divination in general plays much less of a role in Umbanda than in Candomblé. Knowing the identity of these orixás is deemed to offer a person insights about themselves.

=== Lesser evolved spirits ===
Although very different in tone from one another, the pretos velhos and the caboclos are together the most important spirit types in Umbanda. Umbanda departs from Spiritism over the value placed on these entities, with Umbandistas believing that Spiritists often negatively misjudge the pretos velhos and the caboclos because of their appearance. For Umbandistas, the caboclos and pretos velhos are "beings of light", entities who inhabit the lower echelons of the Seven Lines of the astral plane. In emphasising the spirits of these socially marginalised groups, Umbanda is sometimes characterised as having an egalitarian nature.

Although they are only the emissaries of the orixás, the pretos velhos and caboclos take centre stage in Umbandist rituals. They are particularly prominent during rituals in which practitioners seek assistance with their problems, with Umbandistas approaching these entities in the hope of receiving advice and protection. In practice, Umbanda strongly emphasises practitioner's personal relationships with these spirit beings, with ritual homage given to them in exchange for cures and advice. This relationship bears similarities with that between devotees and the saints in popular Catholicism.

==== Pretos Velhos ====
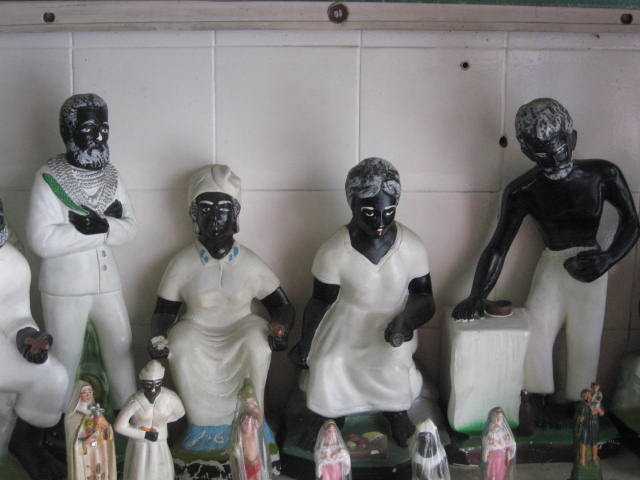
Figurines of the pretos velhos ("old blacks"), one of the most popular spirit types in Umbanda

The pretos velhos ("old blacks") are usually, although not always, regarded as the spirits of deceased African slaves. They are usually conceived as being elderly, and thus referred to with respectful terms like vovô ("grandfather") and vovó ("grandmother"). The pretos velhos are deemed to be kind, patient, and wise. Despite the suffering they endured in life, they are thought to preach forgiveness and love. They are regarded as healers and counsellors, spirits to whom Umbandistas can bring their problems. When a medium deems themselves possessed by one of the pretos velhos, they will often smoke a pipe.

The names of these pretos velhos often reflect Catholic forenames followed by an African national affiliation, as with Maria Congo or Maria d'Aruanda. They will sometimes be addressed collectively as the povo de Bahia (people from Bahia) or as members of a particular nation, such as the povo da Congo (people from Congo). These spirits are commemorated on the feast of the old slaves, held on May 13, marking the day in 1888 when slavery was abolished in Brazil. Wayside shrines dedicated to the pretos velhos can be found in various places in Brazil, although in parts of Amazonia, Umbandist groups have often ignored the pretos velhos or subsumed them as a type of caboclo.

Brown suggested that the portrayal of the pretos velhos reflected the stereotype of the "faithful slave" common in the writings of Brazilians like Castro Alves and Artur Azevedo. This literary trope had in turn been influenced by the popularity of Portuguese translations of the 1852 American novel Uncle Tom's Cabin.

==== Caboclos ====
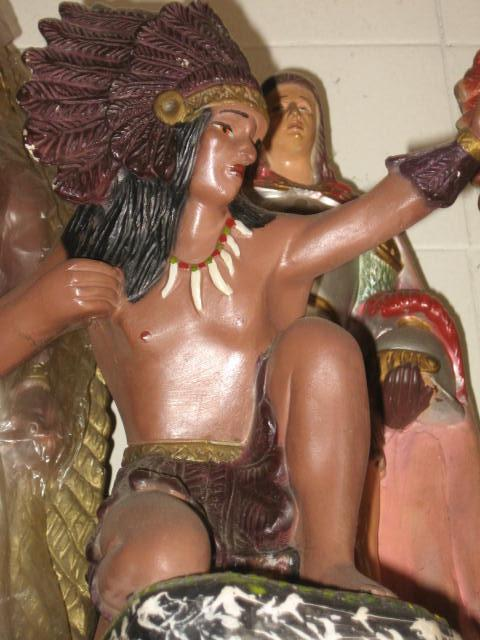
Figurine of a caboclo, the spirit of an indigenous Brazilian hunter and warrior

Caboclos are usually the spirits of indigenous Brazilians, especially those of the Amazon rainforest. In Umbanda, they are regarded as hunters and warriors who are highly intelligent and brave, but also vain and arrogant. Their power comes from the forces of nature, including the sun and moon, waterfalls, and the forest. Their individual names often reflect these links to nature, for instance Caboclo Mata Virgem (Caboclo Virgin Forest) or Caboclo Coral (Caboclo Coral Snake). They are often described as living in the forest, or alternatively in a paradisiacal city in the forest called Jurema.

These spirits often have snakes as their companions, something alluded to in the songs sung about them, and which may derive from certain Afro-Brazilian traditions from northeast Brazil. The caboclos are deemed to have been people who roamed free, and thus can be contrasted with the pretos velhos, who in life were held in bondage. When mediums believe themselves possessed by caboclos, they often adopt stern expressions and make loud, piercing cries, also smoking and drinking alcohol. When these caboclo-possessed individuals perform healing on clients, they often blow cigar smoke over the latter as a means of cleansing and curing them.

The caboclos do not derive from any prolonged contact that Umbanda's founders had with indigenous peoples, but instead reflect the popular Indianismo of Brazilian culture. Their portrayal often draws on the stereotype of Brazil's indigenous peoples being "noble savages", and reflect the heroic depiction of indigenous Brazilians that developed in the country's Romantic literature from the mid-19th century. The term caboclo may derive from the Tupi language term kari'boka ("deriving from the white"). Although associated primarily with indigenous spirits, the term caboclo is also sometimes used for the spirits of cowboys or frontiersmen, or—in parts of northeast Brazil—Turkish kings.

==== Other evolved spirits ====
Below the caboclos and pretos velhos in the Seven Lines of the astral realm are a large number of unidentified guias (spirit guides) and espíritos protetores (spirit protectors). Other types of spirit found in Umbanda include the boiadeiros (cowboys), crianças (children), marinheiros (sailors), malandros (rogues), ciganos (gypsies) and sereias (mermaids).

The crianças are spirits of children and are valued largely for the joy and humor that they bring. Thought to be pure and innocent, they are deemed to enjoy sweets and toys just like living children. In Umbandist rites they are thought to often appear towards the end of proceedings, after tiring adult issues have been dealt with. Those mediums possessed by the crianças often giggle, sing nursery rhymes, and perform in a child-like fashion. Umbandistas often hold an annual birthday party for these spirits on the Roman Catholic feast day of the child martyr saints Cosmas and Damian. It is possible that the crianças derive in part from beliefs about the Ibeji twins, spirits venerated in parts of West Africa.

=== Exús and pombagiras ===
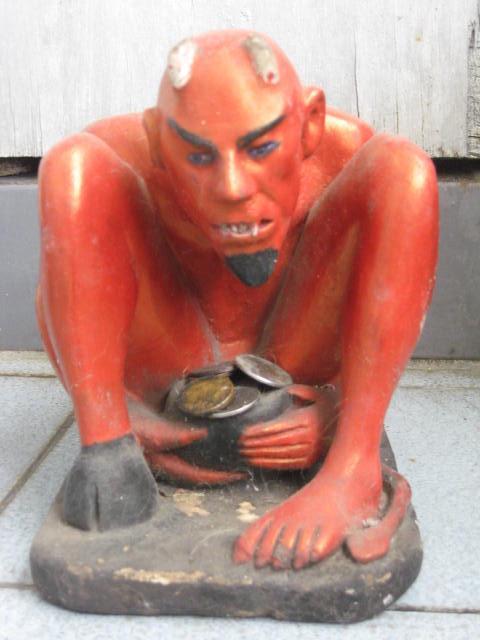
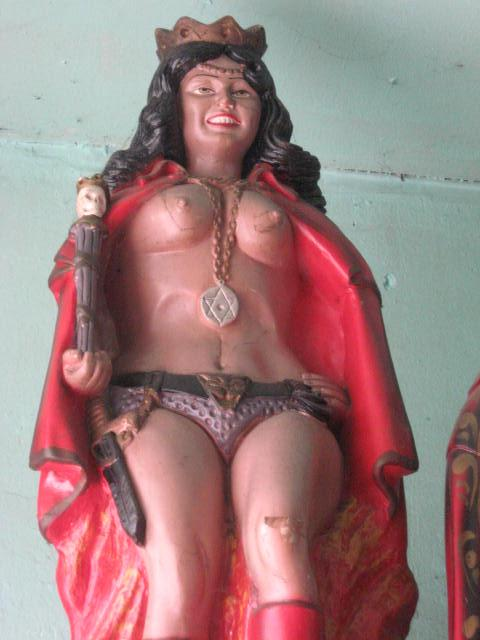
Figurines of an exú (left) and a pomba gira (right), two types of spirits found in Umbanda's theology; Umbandistas often believe that people whose rituals focus on interacting with these entities are Quimbandistas.

In Umbanda, the exús are spirits yet to complete the process of karmic evolution. They are unevolved spirits of darkness which, by working for good, can gradually become spirits of light. Interpretations of these exús nevertheless differ among Umbandistas, with more African-oriented practitioners often taking a more positive attitude towards them. Exús are associated with Friday, and with the colors red and black. They are also linked to the obtaining of power, money, and sex. The term exú derives from the name of a Yoruba orisha spirit regarded as a trickster.

Exús fall into two main categories. The exús da luz (exús of the light) or exús batizados (baptised exús) have repented for their sins and seek redemption and karmic advancement by serving the orixás. In life, the exús da luz were often sinners who performed immoral acts through noble intentions. The other type of exús are the exús das trevas (exús of the shadows), spirits who are unrepentant and who afflict and torment the living. They may act as "obsessors", finding a human victim and "leaning" (encostado) on them, causing the latter problems such as bad luck, compulsive behaviours, or addiction. The exús das trevas may do this due to their resentment of the living, or because they have been commanded to do so by a feiticeiro (sorcerer) practicing Quimbanda. These negative exús are sometimes also called Exú pagão (pagan exú), reflecting the influence of Christian thought. In Umbanda, the exús are often referred to with Christian-derived names like the Devil, Satan, or Lucifer, and are portrayed as being red with horns and tridents, reflecting Christian iconographical influence.

The female counterparts of the exús, pombagiras are regarded as being the spirits of immoral women, such as prostitutes. Linked to marginal and dangerous places, they are associated with sexuality, blood, death, and cemeteries. They are often presented as being ribald and flirty, speaking in sexual euphemisms and double entendres. They wear red and black clothing, and only possess women and gay men, who will then often smoke or drink alcohol, using obscene language and behaving lasciviously. The term pombagira may derive from the Bantu word bombogira, the name of a male orixá in Candomblé's Bantu tradition. In Brazilian Portuguese, the term pomba is a euphemism for the vulva. When rituals focus on the exús and pombagiras, some Umbandistas will say that it constitutes Quimbanda.

=== Mediumship ===
Central to Umbanda are the spirit mediums, individuals responsible for contacting the good spirits. According to Brown, these mediums represent "a sort of intermediate category of semi-specialists" within the religion. Umbandistas believe that the skill of mediumship, or mediunidade, is innate to certain individuals, those capable of vidéncia (seeing) spirit or sensing the spirits' presence through intuition. Umbandist mediums are typically called filhas and filhos de santo (daughters and sons of the saint). Several scholars who have studied the religion have noted that women predominate as spirit mediums. From her research in the late 1960s and 1970s, Brown found that around two-thirds of Umbandist mediums were female and a third were male. She noted that while a few were under the age of 18, this was generally discouraged.

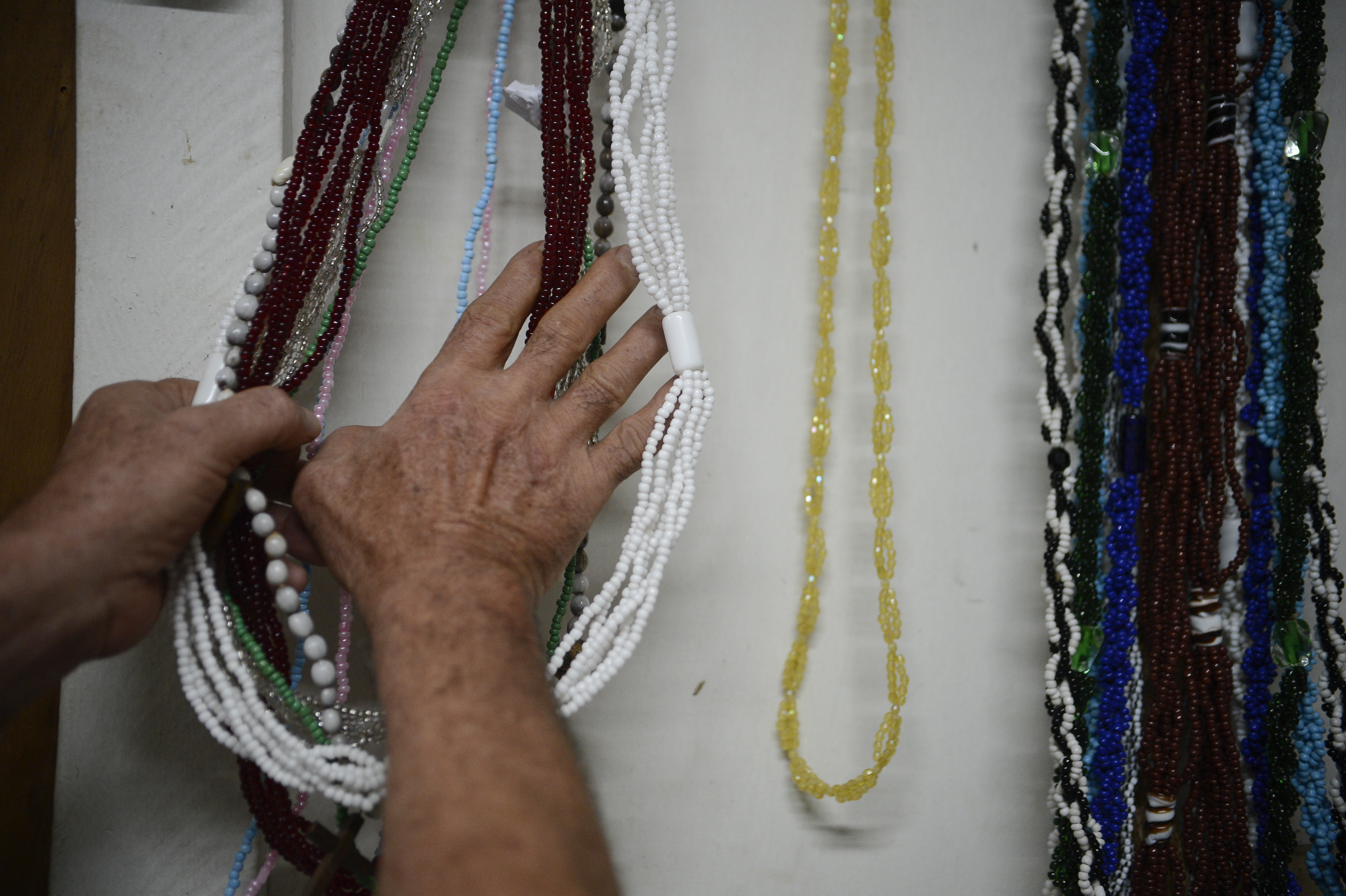
Umbandist mediums may receive necklace to mark the completion of their training

Most Umbandist mediums take on this role as a result of an initial personal crisis, often physical illness or emotional distress, that they come to believe is being caused by spirits as a means of alerting them. Often, they report that they initially resisted the call to become a medium but that the problems faced became too much and so they relented. Developing one's innate mediumistic abilities then takes training; in Umbanda, it may take seven years or more to train, a process known as desensolver mediunidade ("to develop mediumistic abilities"). While a novice, the medium may be called a cambona or cambono. They will often be tasked with assisting established mediums during Umbandista rituals, for instance as ushers or scribes, writing down the messages from the spirits. Novice mediums may find their early possession experiences uncontrollable, but over time they learn to control it. To mark completion of this training, the medium may be given a necklace, the guia ("guide"); henceforth, they are a medium com guia ("medium with a guide").

Each of a medium's spirits will often have their own unique character. Expert mediums are thought to work with spirits from each of the Seven Lines. A medium's relationship with their exú or pombagira is considered close, and is mediated through the giving of gifts. Reciprocity is expected when engaging with the spirits, with those seeking their services often providing them with gifts. A person's misfortunes may be interpreted as a reminder that obligations to the spirits have not been met. Many Umbandistas believe that a good medium should maintain a healthy and pure body, for this reason avoiding smoking, over-eating, or drinking alcohol, especially on the night of an Umbandista session. Some Umbandista mediums operate out of their home, rather than running a centre.

=== Reincarnation ===
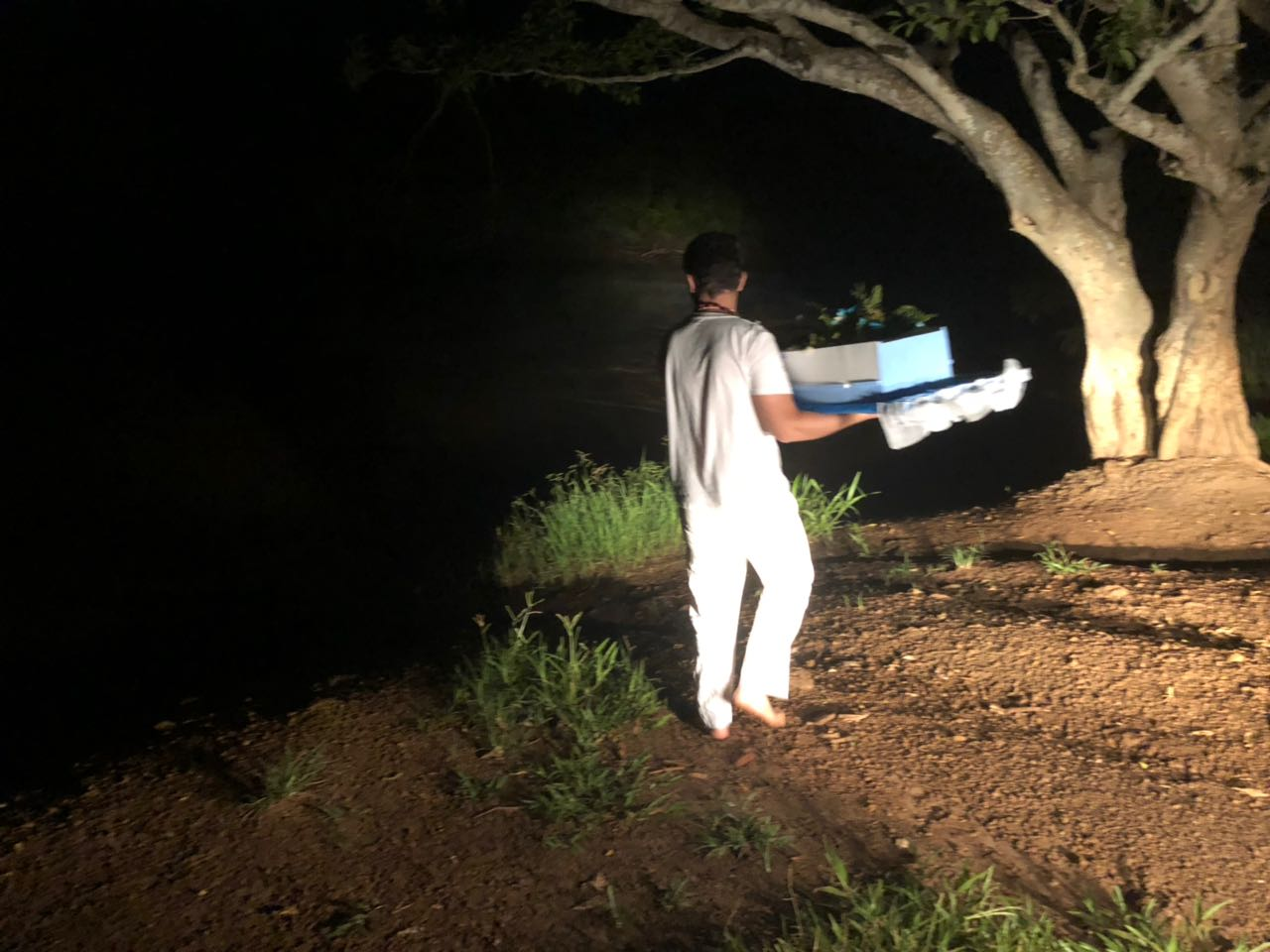
An Umbandist carrying offerings to Iemanjá to a river

Umbanda teaches that everyone has a spirit that survives bodily death. Umbandistas sometimes refer to living people as espíritos enćarnados (incarnate spirits). Like Spiritists, Umbandistas typically believe that each person has a perispirit, a transparent membrane around the body that mediates between the body and soul. They believe that disturbances in either body and soul can impact the perispirit.

From Spiritism, Umbanda takes the ideas of reincarnation and karmic evolution; the terms reincarnação and karma were largely introduced to Brazilian Portuguese via the ideas of Spiritism's French founder, Allan Kardec. Umbandistas believe that the spirit survives bodily death and goes on successive reincarnations, seeking ever higher levels of spiritual evolution. Everyone is subject to karma, and a person can spiritually evolve through their incarnations.

Reincarnation is a central idea for many Umbandistas. Practitioners believe that by serving the spirits and assisting the living they can build up their karmic credit. The higher a person's karmic credit, the higher their level on the astral plane, and then the better the status of their next incarnation. Umbandistas believe that disincarnate spirits can also build up karmic credit. Practitioners sometimes believe that the events of previous incarnations can influence a person, for instance generating certain irrational fears. Some Umbandistas think that the same spirits can meet repeatedly over successive incarnations.

=== Morality, ethics, and gender roles ===
Umbandist morality places key emphasis on caridade (charity), something also evident in Spiritism, and which for both religions may derive ultimately from Roman Catholicism. As in Spiritism, for Umbandistas charity is regarded as a key motor for spiritual evolution. Practitioners for instance may give gifts and food to poor children to mark the festival of the crianças. Umbandistas also place value on humility. Umbandistas often believe that things happen for a reason, rather than being mere coincidence, and are part of a person's path in life. Brown suggested that Umbanda was "an essentially conservative religion", for it does not challenge the socio-economic status quo, and encourages "individual rather than collective responsibility and action".

Brown argued that Umbanda inherited the Roman Catholic view that the world was a battleground between good and evil. Umbandistas often embody all the things that they oppose in the term Quimbanda. In the Umbandist view, Quimbanda is associated with evil, immorality, and pollution, and particularly with the use of exús. Given that Umbanda places focus on combating the harmful influences of exús, a common saying among Umbandistas is that "if it weren't for Quimbanda, Umbanda would have no reason to exist". Brown noted that Quimbanda represented "a crucial negative mirror image against which to define Umbanda", suggesting that it could also serve as an "ideological vehicle for expressing prejudices" towards African-derived and lower class religions. In Brazil, there are also individuals who call themselves Quimbandeiros and openly practice Quimbanda.

Noting the predominance of women as spirit mediums, the scholar Patricia Lerch suggested that Umbanda offered Brazilian women a level of prestige and influence otherwise not offered by the low-paying jobs available to them. Engler noted that Umbanda, like Candomblé, offers "scope for the performance of alternative sexualities in a society governed by very conservative heterosexual gender roles." Afro-Brazilian religions are often stereotyped as attracting gay men, and to avoid this stereotype some male Umbandistas refuse to be possessed by female spirits. Based on research in the late 1960s and 1970s, Brown noted that a few centros had "an openly gay orientation" with a largely gay clientele, and in the 21st century some Umbandist priests have conducted same-sex marriages. The orixá Oxumaré, as an entity that spends six months being male and six months being female, is sometimes cited as a patron of gay and bisexual people.

== Practices ==
Umbandist practices often revolve around clients who approach practitioners seeking assistance, for instance in diagnosing a problem, healing, or receiving a blessing. In Umbanda, spiritual knowledge and ethical behaviour are generally seen as being more important than ritual action.

=== Houses of worship ===
An Umbandist centro, or place of worship

Umbandist places of worship are termed centros, or alternatively tendas (tents). Those adopting a more African-orientation are sometimes called terreiros; this term comes from Candomblé, and so is avoided by some practitioners of White Umbanda. Each centro will typically have its own Padroeiro, or patron spirit. They are often totally autonomous, although some are members of larger Umbandist federations. Due to their autonomous organization, some Umbandist leaders as of 2025 have been accused and arrested in insolated incidents, following allegations of "rape, sexual violence by fraud, sexual harassment, torture, extortion, threats, and bodily harm," and "concealment of evidence" among other cases of religious abuse. In 2024, an arrest was also made on similar allegations. Following one arrest, the Ceará Spiritist Union of Umbanda reiterated their "complete confidence in the innocence of our member".

A centro may occupy a purpose-built structure although may be based out of someone's home. Sometimes several centros will share the same structure, arranging their services at different times from each other. An insignia, the ponto riscado (sacred sign) may be on the exterior of the building to identify its function. Certain rituals may also be held outdoors, for instance beside a stream or the sea if that location is deemed particularly appropriate to the rite.

The main ritual space is called the barracão. Often this will face east, a direction deemed most conducive to astral forces. Sacred objects will often be buried beneath the floor, and these are termed axés. This main room will typically have paintings of the spirits on the walls, a space for practitioners to dance, and an altar. The altar will often have figurines of the caboclos, preto velhos, and orixás, the latter often in their form as Roman Catholic saints. Flowers and glasses of water are also often present to attract good forces, the latter a direct influence from Spiritism. Seating in rows to face the main ritual area is also common. Afro-Brazilian oriented terreiros may also have multiple outdoor shrines to different orixás.

Centros have both formal and informal hierarchies. Each is typically led by an individual called the chefe ("chief"), a term borrowed from Spiritism, or alternatively the mãe-de-santo ("mother-of-saint") or pai-de-santo ("father-of-saint"), terms from Candomblé. In some groups, leaders may be called a babalaô, a term that may be borrowed from the Yoruba word babalawo, a diviner in the Ifá system. A chefe is usually a medium who receives the highest ranking spirits, and they will often lead group prayers and deliver sermons during services. Their leadership is often rooted in their individual charisma, and most have full-time jobs other than their role at the centro. Brown noted that, although women predominate as Umbandist mediums, most chefes were men. The second-in-command is the mãe pequena ("little mother"). A centro may close on the death of this leader; alternatively, their leadership role will often be passed to a family member or, more rarely, to a non-related senior initiate.

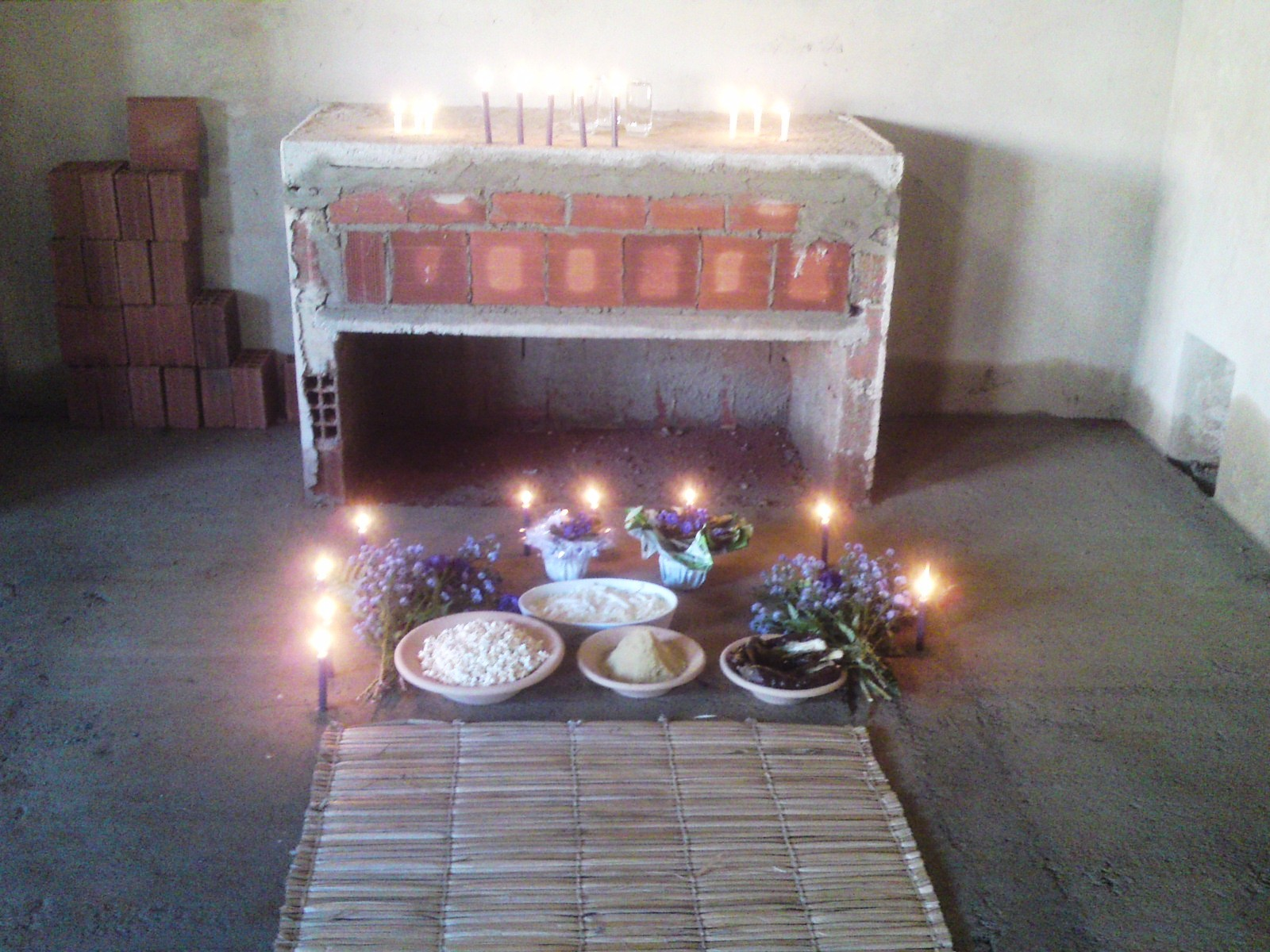
Offerings to the orixá Nana at an Umbandist centro

The chefe may refer to those under them as meus filhos do centros (my children of the centre), reflecting that they constitute a ritual godparent to them. Under the chefe will be the corpo mediúnico (ritual corps), the group of mediums active at that centro. These in turn divide into the médiums de consulta (consulting mediums) and the médiums em desenvolvimento (mediums in training). The latter are often expected to attend training sessions, the sessões de desenvolvimento, and to learn their ritual obligations to different spirits as well as the necessary ritual songs and the Umbandist cosmology. Advancement within the centro often relies on a person's development as a medium. In smaller centros, there may be between 10 and 60 members of the corpo mediúnico, while at larger centros there can be several hundred. These larger centros may therefore have further subdivisions within the corpo mediúnico as well as multiple sub-chefes. Mediums are often expected to abstain from alcohol or sex prior to a ceremony. The congregation of lay Umbandists who attend services at the centro are called the assistência.

Some centros will also have a place for the mediums to change clothing, a kitchen, and an office. There is much work involved in running a Umbanda centro, for instance overseeing maintenance and paying bills. To gain legal registration with the Brazilian state, centros require an administrative system, often consisting of a board of directors, president, vice president, secretaries, and treasurers, although the size of this administration varies by centro. The centro is financed largely by its members, who consist of both its ritual corps and its regular lay attendees; they are expected to pay an initial registration and a monthly membership fee. Centros will sometimes also operate in a manner akin to mutual aid societies, offering their members social welfare services such as access to doctors and dentists or burial funds. The social activities common among Brazil's Christian churches, such as picnics, dances, and coffee mornings, are largely absent from Umbandist centros.

=== Rituals and ceremonies ===
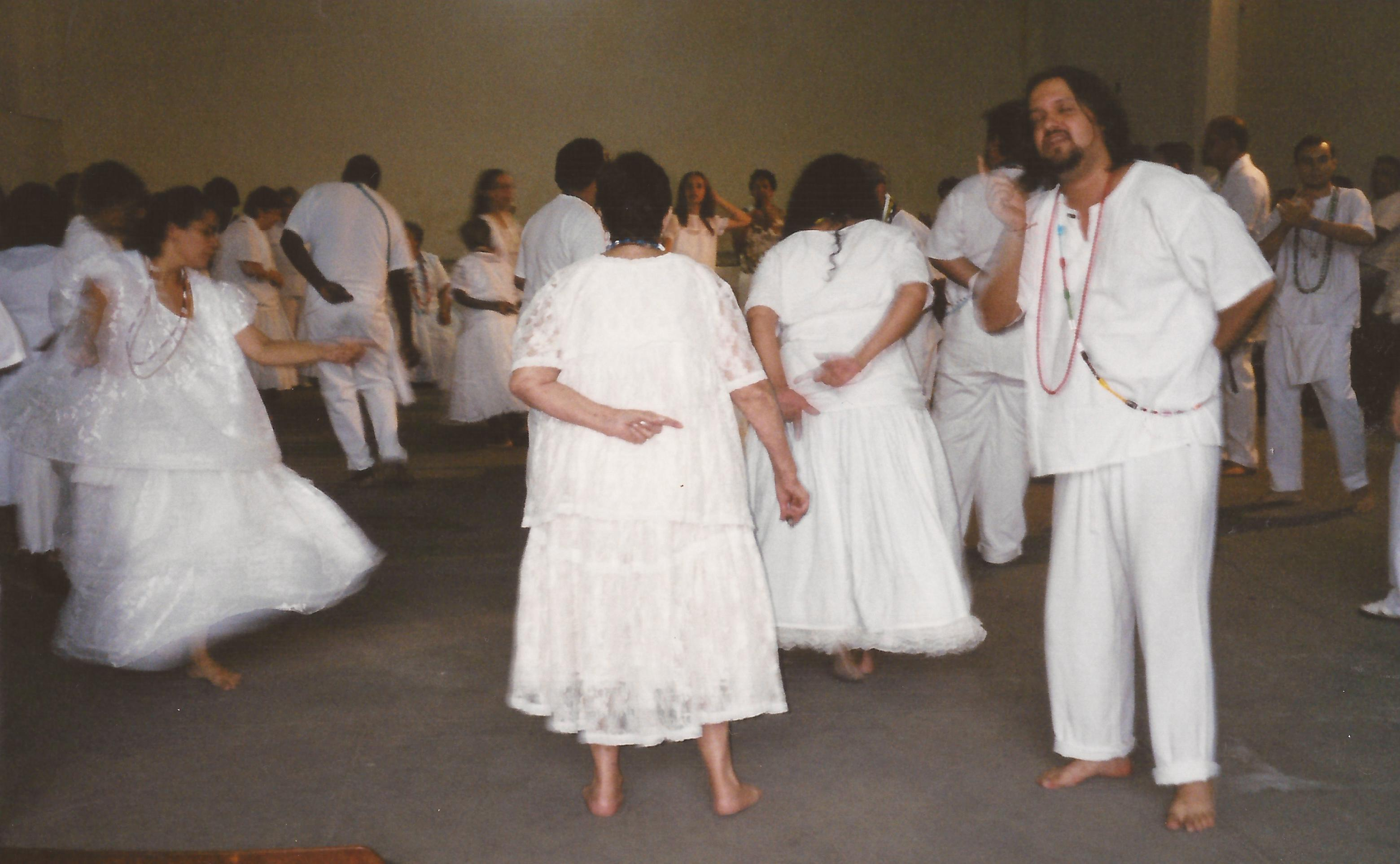
Umbandists wear white during their ritual dances to invoke the spirits

Umbandistas typically hold public ceremonies called sessões (sessions) several times a week. These take place in the centro; if an Umbandist group lacks one, it will instead be in rented premises or a private home. The purpose of these rituals is to invoke spirits to come to earth, where they may take possession of the mediums and thus offer spiritual consultations to the congregation. Brown described these Umbandist rituals as being livelier than Catholic or Spiritist ceremonies, but less so than those of Afro-Brazilian traditions or Quimbanda.

Mediums and others engaged in Umbandist rituals typically wear white clothing; for men this often means white tee-shirts and trousers, for women layered white skirts, singlets, or blouses. This uniformity conveys an impression of equality among practitioners, and also distinguishes them from Candomblé practitioners, who may wear more complex and colorful attire. Umbandistas also usually remove their shoes on entering the ritual space, before genuflecting to the altar. To start a ceremony, a ritual purification using incense, the defumacão, is used to banish harmful spirits, with the exús often being placated and asked to remain absent. Offerings of food may be given to the spirits, typically consisting of fruit, rice, and coconut milk.

A session may be begun with the recitation of a Roman Catholic prayer or the reading of passages from Kardec's writing. Singing often opens a session, with a song sung at such ceremonies being called a ponto, curimba, or ponto cantado. Usually sung in Portuguese, they typically involve "strophic song forms, couplets and quatrains with abeb rhyming schemes". The pontos celebrate the powers and exploits of the spirits, thereby inviting them to attend the ritual, where they can then engage in spirit possession. In a ritual, pontos will often be sung in honor of the leader of each of the Seven Lines. In White Umbandist groups, the singing will be accompanied by hand clapping, while more African-influenced groups often also employ drumming.

Umbandist practice can often incorporate Roman Catholic elements. In São Paulo, for instance, it is common for Umbandist groups to recite the Lord's Prayer or Hail Mary during their rituals. Many Umbandist groups have also embraced New Age practices such as aromatherapy, crystal healing, numerology, tarot cartomancy, reiki, and chakra realignment. The ethnomusicologist Marc Meistrich Gidal suggested that Umbanda embraced change and innovation in liturgy and ritual much more readily than Afro-Brazilian religions like Candomblé and Batuque.

==== Possession and consultations ====
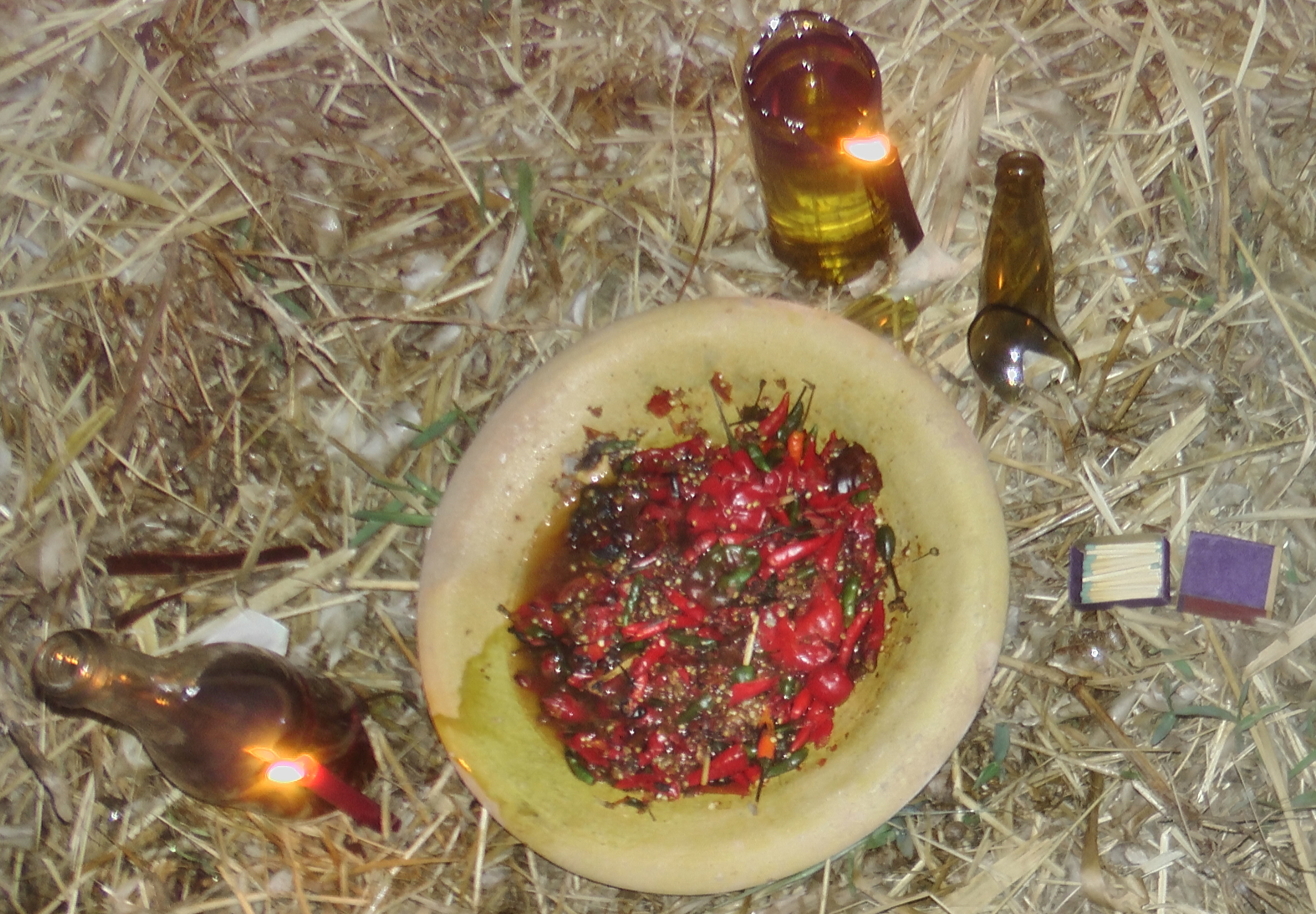
An offering of food to the spirits made in an Umbanda ritual

The gira is a dance to celebrate the orixás; the members of the ritual corps will often dance in a procession. During the gira, some participants will become possessed, ceasing to dance and instead swaying and jerking rapidly. In Umbanda, the term incorporação (incorporation) is usually used to describe this possession. While possessed, the medium is considered a cavalos (horse), or sometimes an aparelhos (vehicle), for the possessing spirit. Their first act will sometimes be to bow before the altar to display respect for the orixás. The possessed medium's facial expressions and demeanour may change to reflect the entity within them, while attendants may dress them in a manner suited to this spirit, for instance with the giving of feathered headdresses to those possessed by caboclos. A possessing spirit may then "open the way" for others to follow it.

Once all of the spirits are believed to have arrived, the singing and dancing will stop and the consultas (consultations) will begin. These consultas typically take up over half the ceremony's length. Those clients awaiting a consultation with the mediums will often have a numbered ficha (token), and will sit waiting until their number is called, at which they can approach a medium. The individual guiding the client to the medium in question may be called a porteiro ("usher") and in some cases is a medium-in-training. The possessed mediums will provide each client with a message, often in a coded ritual language; this message will then be written down by an assistant, the escrevedor (scribe), who may also interpret it for the client. Consultas form the principal link between Umbandist mediums and lay followers, and it is as a client at a session that most people first engage with Umbanda. Successful consultas attract converts and are a centro's main means of recruitment. Mediums who gain reputations to successful consultations gain prestige; in doing so, they may end up challenging the head of the centro. Such mediums might also split off to form their own centro.

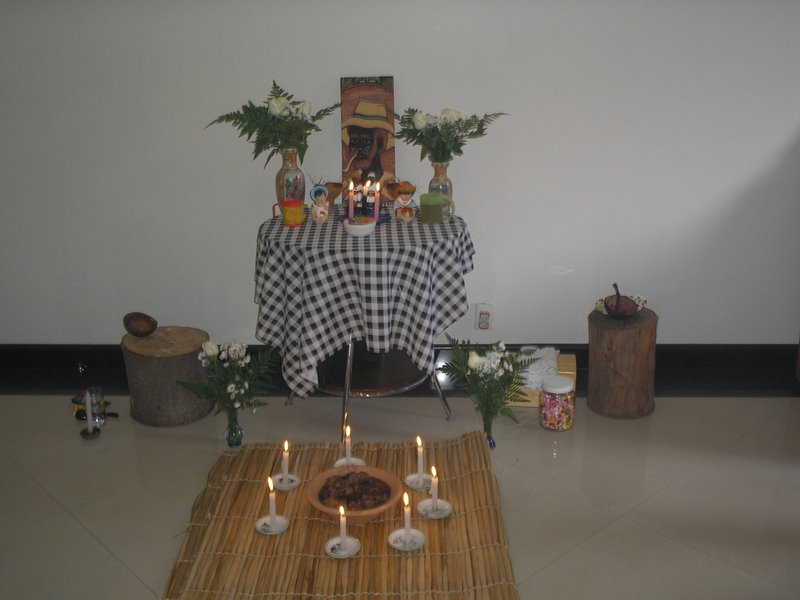
An altar dedicated to the pretos velhos spirits

If exús possess a medium during the session, they will generally be exorcised. If a client is diagnosed as being harassed by exús, efforts will be made to tirar (pull out) this entity from the person's body. Sometimes, multiple mediums will do so, placing their hands on the patient and absorbing the exú into themselves; it is believed that they have the ability to defend themselves from its influence. In some instances, clients have also reported being possessed during the ceremony. Once the consultas are over, services often end with prayers and pontos. The practitioners will then change out of their ceremonial clothing and leave. Mediums who were possessed often report no memory of the events that transpired during the possession.

In White Umbanda, consultations generally always take place as part of the public ceremony, thus emphasizing the idea that they are being offered to clients as a form of charity, rather than as a means of earning money. Umbandist mediums generally do not charge for working with the spirits, but clients will typically support them with material gifts. In more Africanised forms of Umbanda, as in Candomblé, private consultations will also be held outside of public ceremonies.

==== Obrigações ====
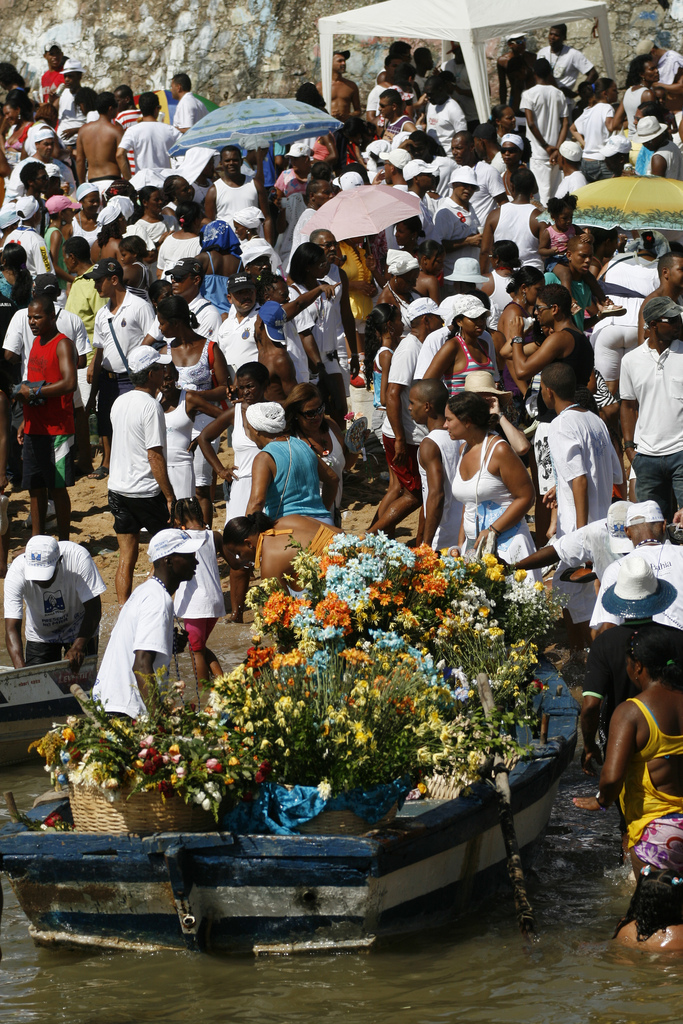
On the Dia de Iemanjá, offerings to Iemanjá are taken to the water in Rio.

A particular orixá will be paid ritual homage on the saint's day that correlates with them. These acts of ritual homage are called obrigações (obligations) and will usually take place at a place in the natural environment associated with the orixá in question, for instance a pile of rocks for Xangô, at fresh water for Oxúm, or at salt water for Iemanjá. Ritual homage will also sometimes be made to exús, in which case it is usually done at the crossroads. Offerings to the exús typically include candles, cachaça, cigarettes, and sacrificed black chickens. Many Umbandists believe that performing a homage to these entities goes beyond the bounds of Umbanda and becomes Quimbanda.

There are also specific festivals in the Umbandist calendar devoted to particular orixá. December 31 is for instance the Dia de Iemanjá, and sees thousands of Umbandistas and other participants amass on Rio's beaches. Umbandistas often also associate Brazil's Abolition Day, celebrated on May 13, as a reference to their pretos velhos. Certain Umbandist groups, particularly those of a more Africanist-orientation, have also organised public processions on the Catholic saint days that correspond to particular orixás. These processions are similar to those also held by Catholics.

==== In Afro-Brazilian Umbanda ====
In Africanized Umbandista terreiros, ceremonies tend to take place on Saturday nights, beginning around 10pm and continuing until dawn. In contrast to the white clothing of White Umbandista groups, practitioners at these ceremonies will often be colorfully dressed. More African-oriented Umbandista groups will often feature practices like animal sacrifice, dancing, and drumming which are found in Afro-Brazilian religions like Candomblé. These are typically avoided by White Umbanda traditions, the practitioners of which sometimes regard such practices as primitive.

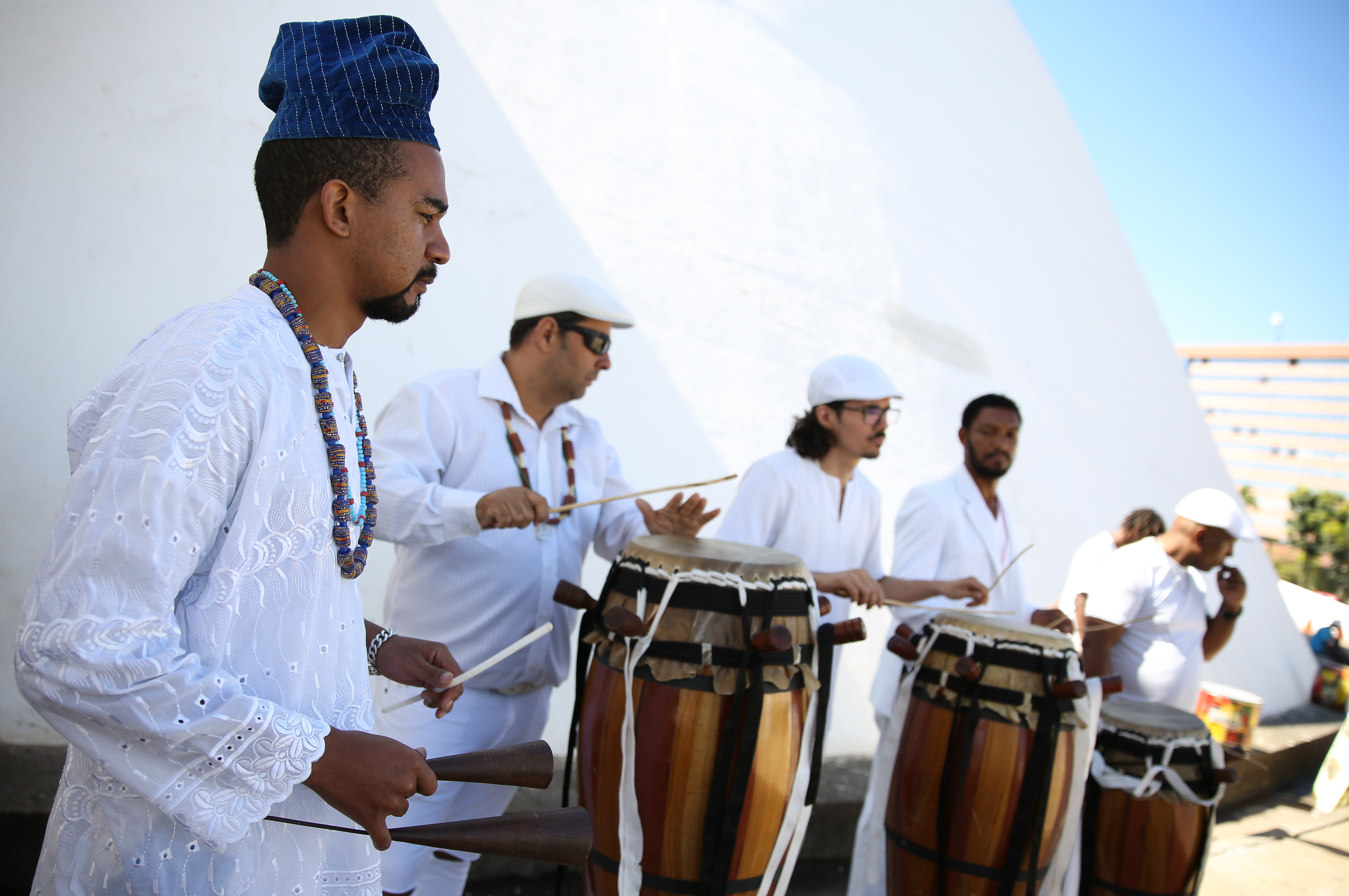
Umbandist drummers; the use of drums is common in more Africanised variants of Umbanda

The drumming is performed to summon the spirits to appear at the ceremony; different rhythms are often selected for different orixás. Amid the drumming, singing, and dancing in a circle, Umbandistas believe that the caboclos, as representatives of the orixás, will appear and possess one of the participants. Later in the ceremony, other caboclos, as well as pretos velhos, exús, and pomba giras, will appear and possess people to offer advice, protection, and healing.

Animals sacrificed in these African-oriented terreiros are usually chickens, although sometimes guinea fowl, sheep, goats, or more rarely, bulls. Typically, the animal's throat will be cut, after which its corpse may be butchered and body parts placed on the altar. In White Umbanda, these sacrifices are deemed misguided, unnecessary, and cruel, with White Umbandistas believing that blood sacrifice attracts the lowest types of spirits and generate bad karma for those engaging in the sacrifice. Various White Umbandistas have also questioned why spiritual beings would require nourishment from physical blood.

=== Healing ===
Clients typically approach Umbanda seeking assistance for problems to do with relationships, family, employment, finances, and especially health. Clients' problems are often, although not always, attributed to a spiritual cause; Umbandist healers then claim to treat the spiritual cause of the ailment, not just its biological symptoms. Common causes of harm can include malevolent and ignorant spirits from the underworld, karmic retribution from previous lifetimes, spiritual disequilibrium (desequilíbrio), a neglect of the orixás, or the curses of living humans, including from the evil eye. Sometimes, the client's problems are diagnosed as evidence that they are ignoring their own undeveloped powers as a medium.

One treatment, descarrêgo, involves discharging negative energy from around the patient using the healer's hands, a technique deriving from the Spiritist passe. If a person believes they are being tormented by a malevolent spirit. Umbandist mediums will then cajole the spirit to leave. If a person is repeatedly attacked by spirits, Umbandistas may deem that individual to be especially sensitive to spirits and recommend that they become a medium themselves so as to learn to control the issue. To deal with harmful spirits, the medium may encourage their client to create an Umbandist altar in their home, or to light candles intended to dispel harmful spirits and attract good ones.

Umbandist mediums may prescribe herbal or homeopathic remedies for their clients. Umbandistas often employ herbal baths or washes called banhos to cleanse and fortify themselves. Another type of herbal infusion, amacis, are more commonly found in Afro-Brazilian Umbanda and are often rooted in Afro-Brazilian medicinal traditions. Herbs used may be collected on specific days based on their astrological associations. Also found in Afro-Brazilian Umbandist groups is a complex healing rite termed the sacudimento (shaking), in which offerings are given to the spirits and prayers and songs are offered. There are also Umbandist groups that offer spiritual surgeries, in which tumours and other problems are allegedly cut from the body using etheric means.

The use of spiritual healing does not mean that Umbandists dismiss mainstream medicine; practitioners of White Umbanda generally place great faith in the latter, reflecting the ideological positivism inherited from Spiritism. Umbandist mediums have for instance been involved in biomedical HIV prevention programs in Brazilian favelas. Practitioners will often see the two methods of healing as complementary, with the spirits dealing primarily with the spiritual aspects of illness rather than the physical ones. Umbandistas have sometimes explained that they are capable of offering certain levels of healing, for instance helping patients to better cope with their ailment, even if they cannot enact a total cure.

== History ==
=== Background ===
Umbanda derives from the combination of Afro-Brazilian religions with Spiritism. Amid the Atlantic slave trade, between 3.5 and 4 million enslaved Africans were transported to Brazil, with the numbers reaching their highest levels in the 19th century. The trade continued until 1851, with slavery ultimately being abolished in the country in 1888. In Brazil, enslaved Africans were allowed to join Roman Catholic religious brotherhoods, and it was within these that they privately continued the practice of African-derived religious traditions. Different names for Afro-Brazilian traditions arose in different parts of the country; in Salvador, Bahia, these traditions became Candomblé. The 19th century saw Rio de Janeiro become Brazil's economic hub, resulting in growing numbers of Afro-Brazilians moving there. Afro-Brazilian religious groups were first recorded in Rio de Janeiro in the early 20th century, although were probably present in the city beforehand. Candomblé was likely introduced to the city by migrants from Bahia. In the early decades of the 20th century, Candomblé was subject to considerable disapproval from the bourgeoise classes and the dominant Roman Catholic Church, with its terreiros often experiencing police repression. Umbanda departed from Candomblé in various ways; it reduced the pantheon of orixás found in Candomblé, dropped the practice of animal sacrifice, and simplified the initiation process.

A variant of the American religion of Spiritualism, Spiritism was developed by the Frenchman Allan Kardec. Kardec's Spiritism combined Spiritualism's general emphasis on spirit mediumship with the Hindu ideas of karma and reincarnation, Christian ethical systems, and the social evolutionism and positivism of Auguste Comte. It placed emphasis on the idea of spirits progressing on a path of moral and intellectual evolution, meaning that there is a distinction between higher, or "evolved" spirits, as well as lesser ones. Spiritism arrived in Brazil c. 1857, where it was often called Kardecismo or Espiritismo. Brazil's Spiritists still often regarding themselves as Roman Catholics. Spiritism proved popular among the largely white Brazilian bourgeoisie, with Rio becoming the hub for Brazilian Spiritist activity. The first Brazilian Spiritist Federation forming in 1884 as an attempt to unify the movement. Throughout Latin America, Spiritism often hybridised with other religious traditions from the 1860s on. Brown noted that Umbanda was "deeply influenced" by Spiritism but "diverged from it in many important ways". Umbanda would make the spirits of African and Indigenous American people central to many of its rituals, but in Spiritism these entities were often perceived as being low on the level of spiritual evolution and thus avoided.

=== Foundation ===
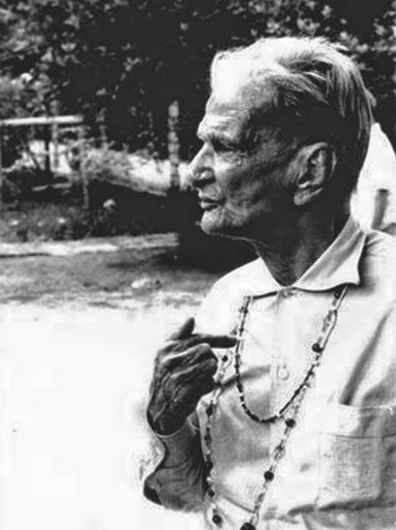
Zélio de Moraes, the founder of the first Umbandist group

Umbanda is generally regarded as having emerged in the area around Rio de Janeiro during the 1920s. There is a lack of clear evidence regarding Umbanda's foundations and it is possible that it emerged from multiple origins around the same time, with various early 20th-century groups having combined Spiritist and Afro-Brazilian religious practices.

A key figure was Zélio Fernandino de Moraes, founder of the first Umbandist group, the Centro Espírita Nossa Senhora da Piedade (Spiritism Center of Our Lady of Mercy). This initially operated in Niterói from the mid-1920s before moving to the centre of Rio de Janeiro in 1938. According to claims that gained prominence in the 1970s, in 1908, when he was 17 years old, Moraes had been cured of an illness by a highly evolved spirit. His parents then took him to a Spiritist ritual, where the spirit Caboclo Seven Crossroads (Caboclo das Sete Encruzilhadas) incorporated into him. This spirit defended the appearance of African and indigenous spirits that then incorporated in other mediums, despite the Spiritist prejudice towards them.

Umbanda's founders were Kardecist Spiritists disappointed with Spiritist orthodoxy, and who were interested in the country's Afro-Brazilian religious traditions, which they deemed more exciting and dramatic than those of the Spiritists. They were mostly white men, largely occupied in middle-class professions involving commerce, government bureaucracy, and the military. Most were sympathetic to the reforms of President Getúlio Vargas, with de Moraes being a local pro-Vargas politician. Brown suggested that Umbanda could be seen as an attempt by middle-class white Brazilians to exert control over the popular religion of the lower classes, drawing comparison with how other lower class practices like samba, capoeira, and Carnival were also embraced as symbols of Brazilian national culture in the early 20th century. By combining Afro-Brazilian and European ideas, Umbanda was presented as a national religion for Brazil at a time when the country was increasingly being presented as a cultural melting pot.

In 1939, Zélio de Moraes formed the first Umbandist federation, the Umbandist Spiritist Union of Brazil. In 1941, the Primeiro Congresso do Espiritismo de Umbanda (First Congress of the Spiritism of Umbanda) was held in Rio de Janeiro, representing a collective attempt to codify Umbandist teaching. The congress' proceedings were published in 1942 and highlight Umbanda's origins in Spiritism and the early Umbandistas' desire to distinguish themselves from Afro-Brazilian traditions. In turn, some Umbandist groups whose membership was predominantly Afro-Brazilian began maintaining that Umbanda was a religion with African origins, and that anyone not using drumming and animal sacrifice in their rites was not truly practicing Umbanda. In turn, White Umbandist leaders retorted that the Africanised traditions were in fact Quimbanda or Candomblé and were falsely using the term "Umbanda". This confusion may be explained if the term "Umbanda" had been adopted independently both by Zélio de Moraes' group and by practitioners of various Afro-Brazilian groups.

=== After the Second World War ===
The collapse of Vargas' Estado Novo in 1945 allowed Umbanda to be practised more openly. Although it remained concentrated in the cities of southern Brazil, over the coming years Umbanda spread rapidly throughout the country, while in the 1950s and 1960s it also spread to Uruguay, Paraguay, and Argentina.

In response to the growth of Umbanda, Spiritism, and Pentecostalism, Brazil's dominant Roman Catholic Church mounted a campaign against these minority religions, one later formally terminated due to the changes of the Second Vatican Council in the 1960s. In part to counter Catholic opposition, in the late 1950s Umbandistas began campaigns to get their co-religionists elected to office, typically rallying around Brazilian nationalism and calls for religious freedom. The first open Umbandista elected was Attila Nunes, who became a vereador (city councilman) in 1958 and Rio's state deputy in 1960. From the 1950s on, six new Umbandist federations formed in Rio, three of them open to more Africanised elements. The most important of these was the more African-focused Umbandist Spiritist Federation, founded in 1952 by Tancredo da Silva Pinto. For the second congress of Umbandistas in 1961, several thousand attendees met in a Rio football stadium.

In 1964, a military dictatorship took power in Brazil. The military government largely protected Umbanda; many soldiers were Umbandistas and the military government regarded the religion as a counter to the influence of the Roman Catholic Church, which they perceived as having grown increasingly sympathetic to the political left since the 1950s. From 1965, Umbandist centros/terreiros were permitted to secure legal recognition with just a civil registration, while Umbanda also gained recognition as a religion on the Brazilian census. The 1960s and 1970s saw the rapid growth of middle-class participation in Umbanda. After the 1960s and 1970s, the number of Umbandistas declined. During the 1970s, Candomblé spread from Bahia into São Paulo, where it grew rapidly, largely at the expense of Umbanda. Some Umbanda temples transformed into Candomblé temples. Conversely, Umbanda saw growth in northern Brazil during this period. The 1970s also saw the rise in attempts to "re-Africanize" Umbanda by emphasising African elements, reflecting a broader revival of interest in African cultural heritage among Afro-Brazilians.

== Demographics ==
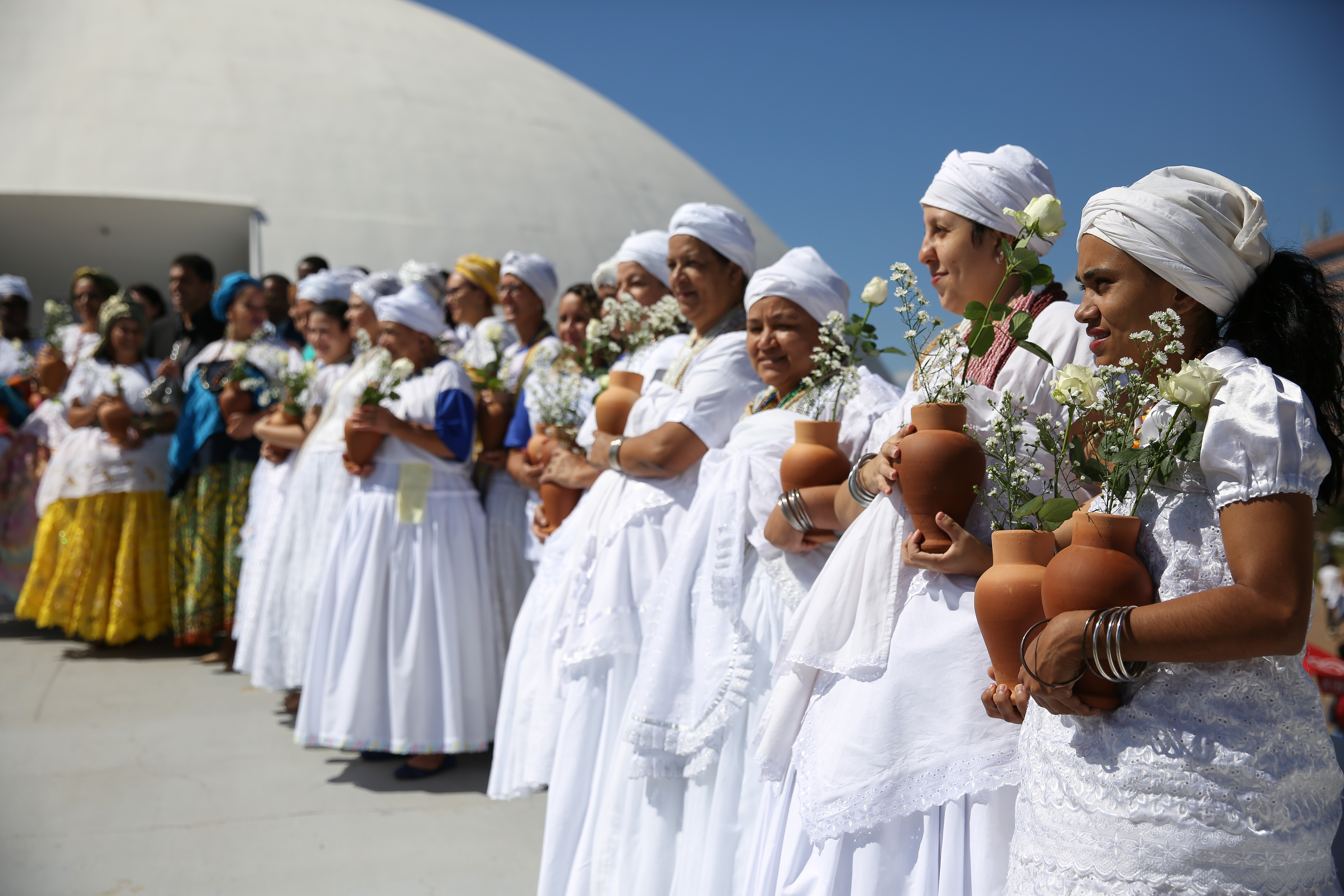
Practitioners of Candomblé and Umbanda at an event run by Brazil's Ministry of Culture in 2018

Diana Brown noted that by the 1970s, there were estimates that between 10 and 20 million people, as much as ten percent of Brazil's population, were practicing Umbanda. In 1969, there were estimates that 100,000 Umbandist centros were then active in Brazil. The number of Umbandistas declined following the 1970s, although in 1986 Brown suggested that Umbanda still had millions of followers in Brazil. These numbers are not reflected in the census data; in the 2000 Brazilian census, only 397,000 people identified as Umbandistas.

These statistics do not account for those who attend Umbandist services but do not consider themselves Umbandistas. Brown noted that many who visit Umbandist centres do so only in emergencies, thus being "casual participants", with Hale suggesting that it was these "occasional participants" who ran into the millions. Although originally concentrated in Brazil's large southern cities, the religion has spread throughout the country. Brazilian immigrants have also taken the religion to other parts of Latin America like Uruguay as well as to the United States.

Umbandistas come from across Brazil's racial and class spectrum, and centros vary in their racial and class demographic. Based on a research sample from different Rio de Janeiro centros in the late 1960s and 1970s, Brown found that 52 percent of practitioners were white, 29 percent mulatto, and 18 percent black. Conversely, writing in the early 21st century, Hale thought that most Umbandistas were people of color and were working or lower class. Brown also suggested that middle-class practitioners have been more influential in Umbanda's history; middle-class Umbandistas have included high-ranking military figures, journalists, and politicians. Brown believed that White Umbandist centros typically had a diverse socio-economic membership, while Africanized Umbandist terreiros had particular appeal for "people in the entertainment world and the arts," gay people, and those in "the upper sectors" of society who were interested in alternative lifestyles.

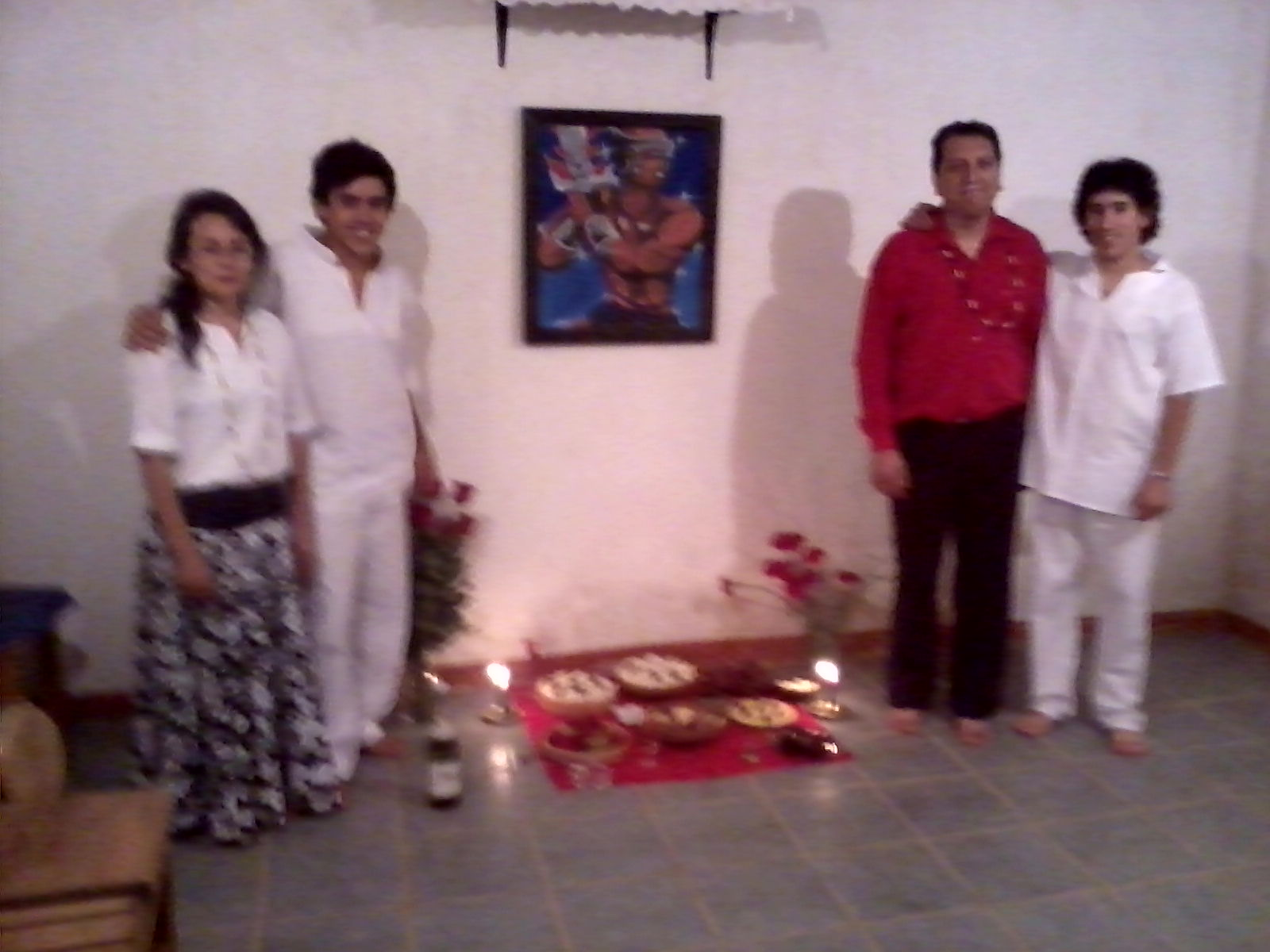
A group of Umbandistas in Argentina

Many of those who come to Umbanda were raised in a different religion. Brown's research found that most of those who started going to a centro learned of it through family or friends. The main reason that people get involved in Umbanda is because they have a problem and hope that the religion's spirits will be able to identify the cause and provide a remedy. Health concerns are the primary reason, but other issues are to do with love, family problems, unemployment, finances, or alcoholism. For many clients, visiting the centro will be a last resort after they have tried other methods of dealing with their problem. In some instances they turn to Umbanda because medical professionals have been unable to successfully diagnose their problem; alternatively, they approach Umbanda because they cannot afford professional medical treatment. Those involved often keep their practice discreet, sometimes not informing family members that they are Umbandistas.

Some Umbandistas move on to join Candomblé, believing that the latter deals with more powerful supernatural forces and thus resolves problems more readily. Umbanda is sometimes described as an appropriate preparation for Candomblé, and the move from Umbanda to Candomblé can also bring greater prestige within Brazilian society. Umbandist mediums sometimes hold critical views of Candomblé, regarding it as authoritarian, and criticising the high prices charged for initiation into it. Other Umbandistas have left the religion for Pentecostalism.

== Reception and influence ==
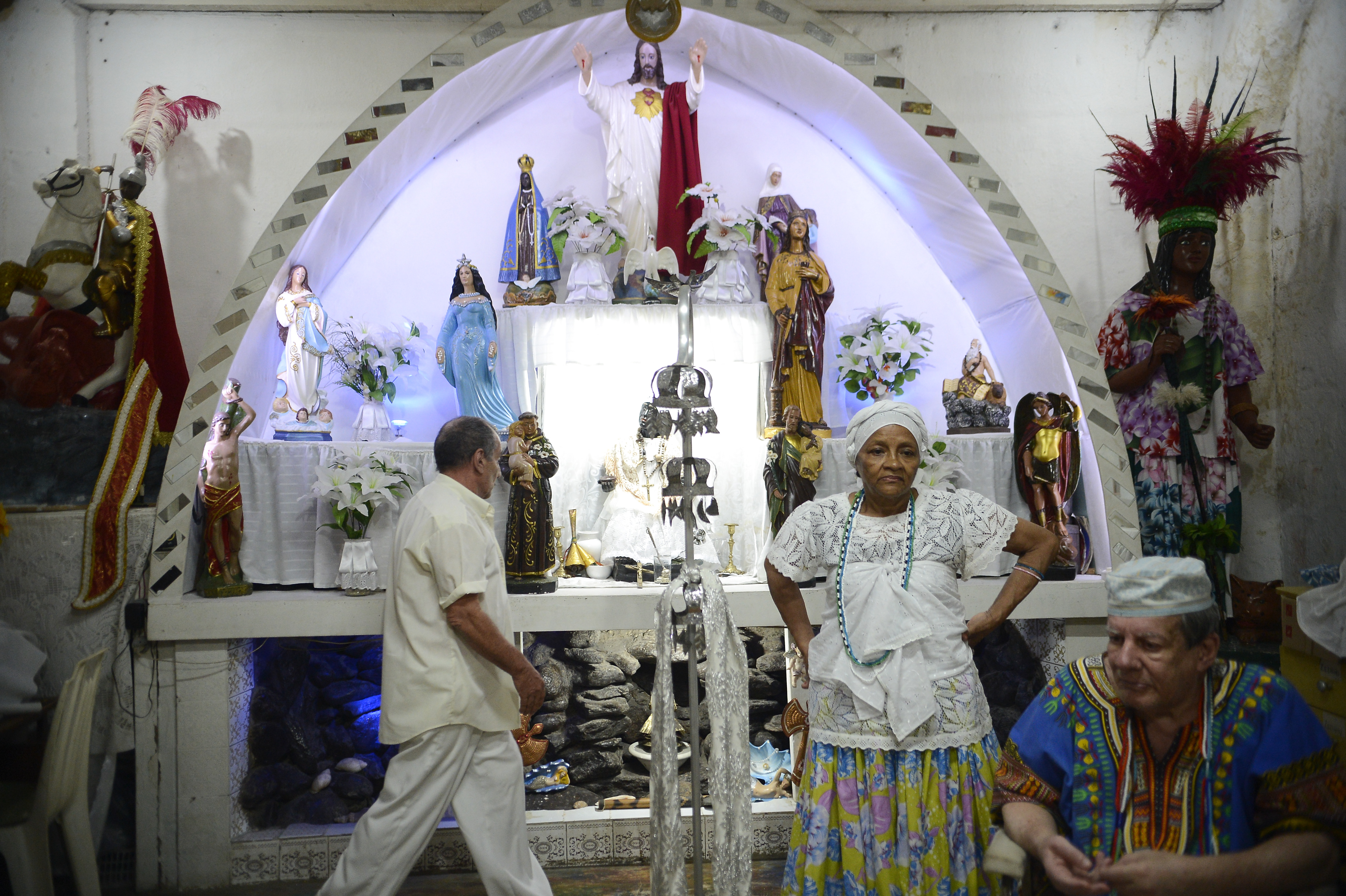
Umbanda practitioners at a centro in Rio de Janeiro

Umbanda has faced opposition from other religions in Brazil. Spiritists have often looked down upon Umbanda because it deals with what they regard as less developed spirits. From the 1950s, Brazil's Roman Catholic establishment campaigned against Umbanda, portraying it as a primitive religion frequented by ignorant people.

A 1961 book by the Franciscan friar Boaventura Kloppenburg, for instance, presented Umbanda as a heresy based on superstition which encouraged sexual permissiveness and harmed its practitioners' mental health. The religion has also been criticised by Protestant groups, which in Brazil are largely Pentecostal, and which see their own religion and Umbanda as mutually incompatible. Many Brazilian Pentecostals openly defined their religious identity in opposition to Umbanda and Candomblé, traditions they believe are associated with the Devil. A Pentecostal-Charismatic and Umbandist dialogue and comparative/constructive theology form a major part of Pentecostal scholar Amos Yong's doctoral dissertation which he later published as Discerning the Spirits: A Pentecostal-Charismatic Contribution to Christian Theology of Religions. Throughout much of the 20th century, Umbanda also faced hostility from Brazilian intellectuals on both the political left and right.

Scholarly research into Afro-Brazilian religions began in the late 19th century, although for much of the 20th century the focus was on Candomblé and other traditions deemed to have a "purer" African origin than the more syncretic Umbanda. In the early 1960s, a group of sociologists at the University of São Paulo began to study Umbanda, the most prominent being Roger Bastide, who saw the religion as an expression of urban industrial change. Over following decades, research focused primarily among Afro-Brazilian Umbandistas, rather than White Umbandist groups. In 2016, following a study by the Instituto Rio Patrimônio da Humanidade (Rio Heritage of Humanity Institute), Umbanda became one of Rio de Janeiro's Intangible Cultural Heritages.

Umbanda has also influenced some practitioners of Santo Daime, and a tradition called Umbandaime has emerged as a hybridized religion combining elements of both. Umbandist trance states have also been studied by Heathens seeking to create new forms of seiðr.
