= Zélio Fernandino de Moraes =

Brazilian medium associated with Umbanda

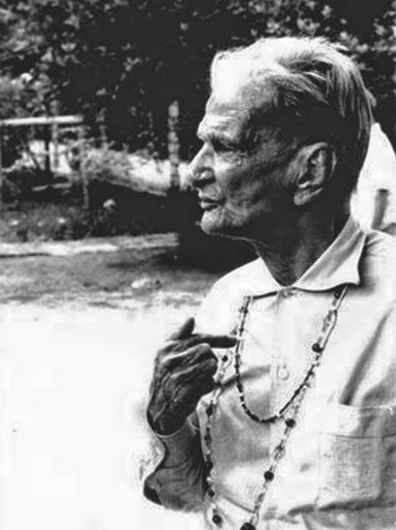
- Born: April 10, 1891; São Gonçalo, Rio de Janeiro, Brazil
- Died: October 3, 1975 (aged 84); Niterói, Rio de Janeiro (state), Brazil
- Occupation: Spiritual medium
- Known for: Association with founding narratives of Umbanda

Zélio Fernandino de Moraes (10 April 1891 – 3 October 1975) was a Brazilian spiritual medium associated with the founding narratives of Umbanda, a syncretic Afro-Brazilian religion that emerged in the early 20th century. In Umbanda tradition, he is linked to the spirit entity known as Caboclo das Sete Encruzilhadas, whose manifestation is said to have announced the formation of a new religious movement in Brazil.

== Biography ==
Zélio Fernandino de Moraes was born in São Gonçalo, in the state of Rio de Janeiro, into a middle-class Catholic family. In his youth, he prepared to enter a military career and enlisted in the Brazilian Navy. According to later religious accounts, in 1908 he experienced a period of paralysis of unknown medical cause, followed by a sudden recovery, an episode that became central to subsequent Umbanda narratives about his life.

Following this episode, Moraes became involved with Kardecist spiritism, which was gaining popularity among urban middle-class groups in Brazil at the time. During spiritist sessions, he reportedly manifested spiritual entities identified as indigenous caboclos and elderly enslaved Africans, figures that later became central symbolic categories within Umbanda.

From the late 1910s onward, Moraes was associated with the establishment of several Umbanda temples (tendas) in the state of Rio de Janeiro, including the Tenda Espírita Nossa Senhora da Piedade. These centers played a role in the early organization and public visibility of Umbanda as an urban religious movement.

In later decades, Moraes remained a reference figure within Umbanda memory, although scholars emphasize that Umbanda developed through multiple actors and regional experiences rather than from a single founding event or individual.
