= Zazhoginskoye =

The Zazhoginskoe field is one of the richest Russian field of shungite on the territory of the Republic of Karelia.

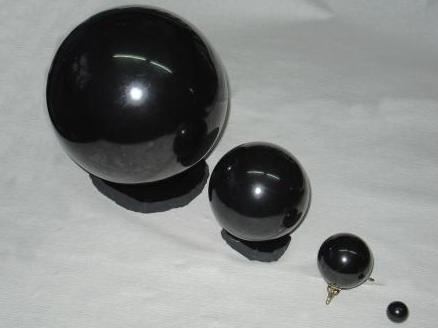
Karelian Horizon Souvenir

== General information ==
The Zazhoginskoe field is one of the largest fields of shungite rocks in the world. It is located on the outskirts of the village Tolvuya in Medvezhyegorsky District of Karelia, 1.7 km from the shore of Lake Onega, 5 km from a navigable bay. Shungite rocks were deposited around the northern part of Lake Onega and under the lake. The field consists of two: Zazhoginskoe and Maksovo. Developed areas of the field are located 2–3 km to the south of the village Tolvuya. The development of Zazhoginskoe field began in the early 1990s.

The field has a size of 22 km x 11 km. On the territory of the deposit are located the village Tolvuya and several other villages, including abandoned. Layers of shungite rocks interspersed with tuffs, dolomite and siltstone. Within the Zazhoginskoe field are sills and dikes of metadiabases and metagabbro. Thickness of the sills is typically less than 50 m, but at the upper base sills reach thicknesses of over 150 m. In general, igneous rocks make up about 30% of the productive series. Rocks of the upper base felt weak regional metamorphism (initial stage greenschist facies). A significant part of the deposits developed with metasomatic replacement of primary minerals by carbonate, sericite, albite and quartz. Currently 25 deposits have been identified and explored in varying degrees, containing from 0.2 to 58.0 million tons of high-carbon shungite rocks.

== Chemical composition of the ores ==
- Carbon - 30%
- Quartz - 45%
- Complex silicates (mica, chlorite) - 20%
- Sulfides - 3%

Rocks within the Zazhoginskoe field are sufficiently stable in composition. The sum (C+SiO_{2}) is in the range of 83 - 90%.

== Economic evaluation of reserves ==
Using the method of A. I. Nijinsky, the identified reserves are valued at around 1,241 million US dollars. According to geologists, there are good prospects for discovery of new fields in the Kondopozhsky District, where the transport infrastructure is well-developed, in contrast to the district of Zaonezhye.

The only developer of Zazhoginskoe field is CDD Carbon-Shungite.
