= Lapidary medicine =

Pseudoscientific concept regarding gemstones

Lapidary medicine is a pseudoscientific concept based on the belief that gemstones have healing properties. The source of the idea of lapidary medicine stems from information found in lapidaries, books giving "information about the properties and virtues of precious and semi-precious stones." These lapidaries not only provide understanding of the sale and production of items of lapidary medicine, but also provide information about common cultural practices and beliefs about gemstones.

The most common application of the concept was to embed precious stones within open-backed jewelry. In his book The boke of secretes of Albertus Magnus of the vertues of herbes, stones, and certayne beasts, bishop Albertus Magnus also suggests the stone be held directly to the skin, or more specifically "be wrapped in a lynnen cloth, or in a calues skyn, and borne vnder ye left arme hole[...]"

While widespread belief in lapidary theory has all but disappeared by the twenty-first century, remnants of the idea can be found in the pseudoscientific concept of crystal healing.
