= Sunga (caste) =

Hindu caste

The Sunga are a Hindu caste found in the state of Rajasthan in India.

== History and origin ==
The Sunga community claim their descent from Parshuram, the great warrior saint of Hindu epics. They claim to be ex-Brahmins, but were excommunicated, and formed a distinct group. The Sunga claim to be a section of the Khandelwal Brahmins. They perceive themselves now to be of the Vaishya varna.

== Present circumstances ==
The Sunga are distributed in the districts of Sirohi, Jalor, Jodhpur, Pali and Bikaner, and speak the Marwari dialect. They have twenty clans. They practice agriculture as subsidiary occupation. Many Sunga have also taken to trading.

== See also ==
- Bania
