= Sunga, Bhopal =

Sunga
- village
- Location within Madhya Pradesh Location within India
- Coordinates: 23.713804°N 77.277157°E
- Country: India
- State: Madhya Pradesh
- District: Bhopal
- Tehsil: Berasia

Population (2011)
  - Total: 1,328
- Time zone: UTC+5:30 (IST)
- ISO 3166 code: MP-IN
- Census code: 482124

Sunga is a village in the Bhopal district of Madhya Pradesh, India. It is located in the Berasia tehsil.

== Demographics ==
According to the 2011 census of India, Sunga has 274 households. The effective literacy rate (i.e. the literacy rate of population excluding children aged 6 and below) is 53.22%.

Demographics (2011 Census)
	Total	Male	Female
Population	1328	701	627
Children aged below 6 years	227	111	116
Scheduled caste	339	181	158
Scheduled tribe	11	5	6
Literates	586	379	207
Workers (all)	626	370	256
Main workers (total)	319	272	47
Main workers: Cultivators	213	199	14
Main workers: Agricultural labourers	54	27	27
Main workers: Household industry workers	10	10	0
Main workers: Other	42	36	6
Marginal workers (total)	307	98	209
Marginal workers: Cultivators	64	5	59
Marginal workers: Agricultural labourers	162	43	119
Marginal workers: Household industry workers	42	23	19
Marginal workers: Others	39	27	12
Non-workers	702	331	371
