= Crystal healing =

Alternative medicine technique

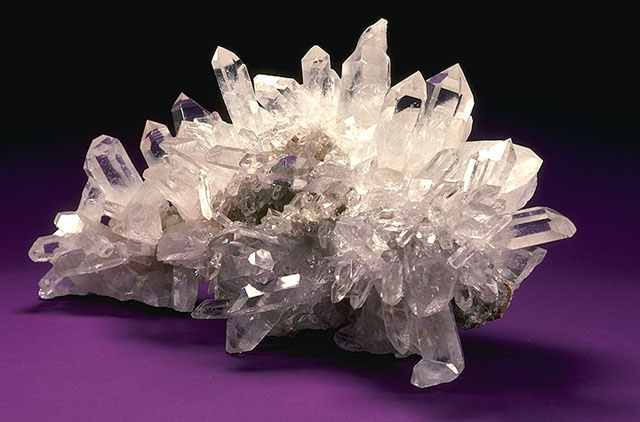
Quartz crystals are often used in crystal healing.

Crystal healing is a pseudoscientific, alternative medicine practice that uses semiprecious stones and crystals such as quartz, agate, amethyst or opal. Adherents of the practice claim that these have healing powers, but there is no scientific basis for this claim. Practitioners of crystal healing believe they can boost low energy, prevent bad energy, release blocked energy, and transform a body's aura.

Believers in crystal healing engage in various physical activities with crystals, typically involving holding, wearing, placing or meditating with the stones. While the practice is popular, it fosters commercial demand for crystals, which can result in environmental damage and exploitative child labor to mine the crystals. Some popular crystals used by believers such as shungite frequently contain heavy metals and present toxicity risks to those handling them for extended periods or ingesting substances which were in contact with the crystals.

== History ==
=== Origins ===
Ancient Egyptians used amulets, which they believed to possess magical properties. The amulet's shape, decoration, inscription, color, material or ritual performed with the amulet dictated its power. Amulets were worn or placed on the body, in the form of stones, piercings, rings, necklaces or other jewelry. The Egyptians used amulets to benefit their afterlife, often representing an Egyptian deity and its specific powers. Amulets were also placed on mummies or in between the mummy's bandages, with funerary pieces usually being larger than those worn by the living. In funeral practices, they also used headrest amulets, which were full-size headrests placed in tombs to protect the dead; they also symbolized the deceased rising and being revived, and the sun rising between two hills, which symbolized resurrection and rebirth.

The ancient Greeks assigned many properties to crystals. The word "crystal" is derived from the Greek word krýstallos, which translates to 'ice'. The ancient Greeks believed that clear quartz crystals were a water that had frozen to the point where it would remain in its solid form.

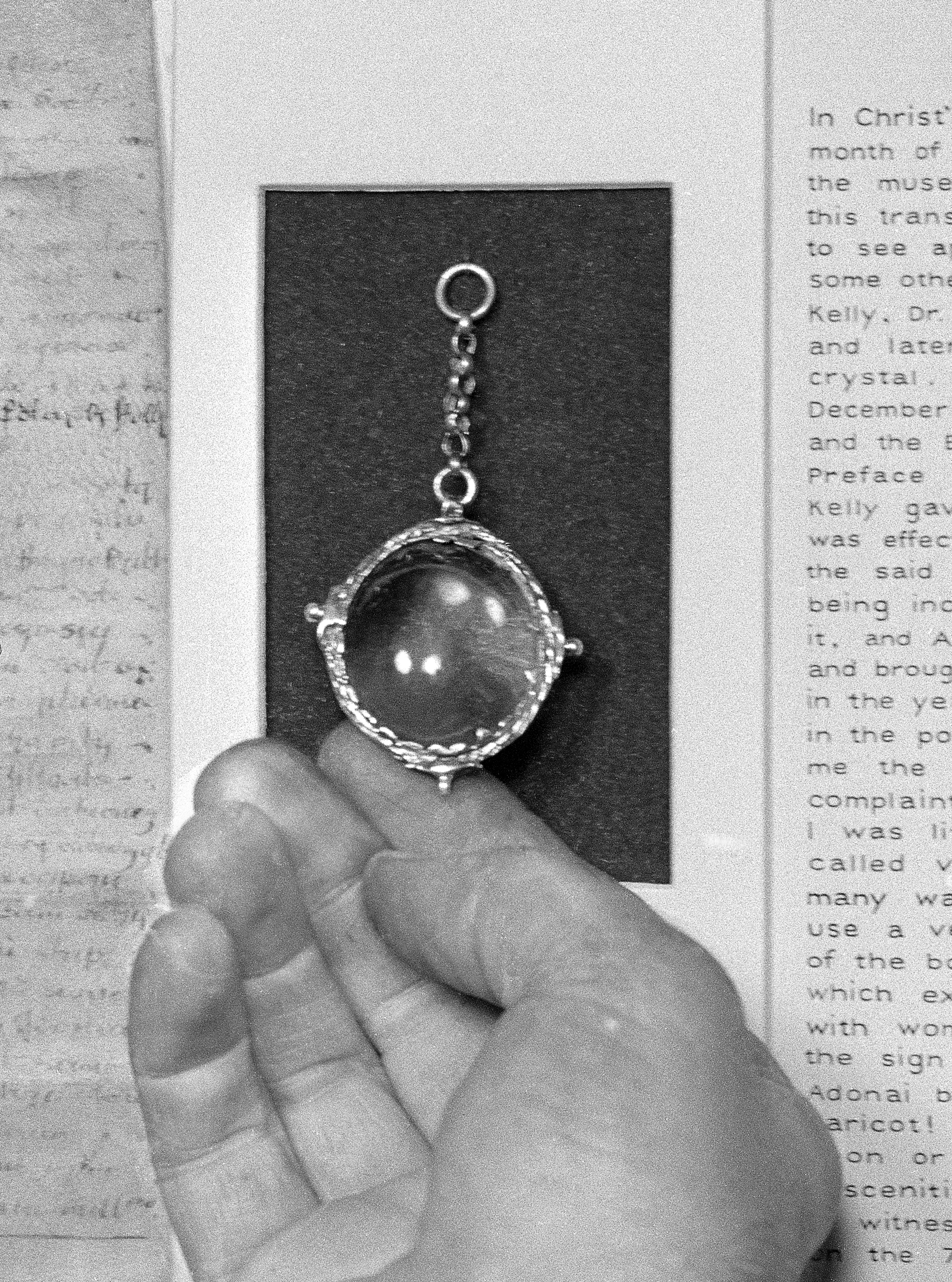
John Dee's crystal, used for clairvoyance and healing, which he said was given to him by the angel Uriel in November 1582

Precious stones have been thought of as objects that can aid in healing—in a practice known as lapidary medicine—by various cultures. The Hopi Native Americans of Arizona use quartz crystals to assist in diagnosing illnesses. The alleged medicinal properties of precious stones, as well as other powers they were believed to hold, were collected in texts known as lapidaries.

== Contemporary use ==
=== New Age ===
In the English-speaking world, people may often associate crystal healing with the New Age spiritual movement: it is "the middle-class New Age healing activity par excellence" in the words of Stuart McLean. In contrast with other forms of complementary and alternative medicine (CAM), participants in crystal healing view the practice as "individuated", that is dependent on extreme personalization and creative expression. Practitioners of crystal healing purport that certain physical properties such as shape, color, and markings, determine the ailments that a stone can heal; lists of such links are published in commonly distributed texts. Paradoxically, practitioners also "hold the view that crystals have no intrinsic qualities but that, instead, their quality changes according to both" participants. After selecting the stones by color or by their believed metaphysical qualities, practitioners place them on parts of the body.

Crystal healing can manifest in association with or alongside other New Age and energy-medicine practices, such as the use of reiki, flower essences or homeopathy.

=== Sales and industry ===
Worldwide, retail sales of crystals were estimated to amount to more than US$1 billion per year in 2019.

India, China, Brazil, and Madagascar are the main producers of crystals. In Madagascar, one of the sources of crystals, most crystals are mined in unsafe, non-industrial or "homemade" mines, with parents and children working together to dig crystals from pits and tunnels they dig with shovels. The miners are usually paid between 17 and 23 cents per kilogram for rose quartz (≈ 8 - 11 cents per pound). The miner's income may be just 0.1% of the final retail price. Some people in the industry say that the low pay for miners is because customers in developed countries want low retail prices; others say that it is due to shops in developed countries wanting to be more profitable.

== Scientific evaluation ==
There is no peer-reviewed scientific evidence that crystal healing has any effect; it is considered a pseudoscience. Alleged successes of crystal healing can be attributed to the placebo effect. Furthermore, there is no scientific basis for the concepts of chakras, being "blocked", energy grids requiring grounding or other such terms; they are widely understood to be religious or spiritual in nature. Energy, as a scientific term, is a very well-defined concept that is readily measurable and bears little resemblance to the esoteric concept of energy used by proponents of crystal healing.

In 1999, researchers French and Williams conducted a study to investigate the power of crystals compared with a placebo. Eighty volunteers were asked to meditate with either a quartz crystal or a placebo stone, which was indistinguishable from quartz.

Many participants reported feeling typical "crystal effects"; however, this was irrespective of whether the crystals were real or a placebo. In 2001 Christopher French, head of the anomalistic psychology research unit at the University of London, and colleagues from Goldsmiths College outlined their study of crystal healing at the British Psychological Society Centenary Annual Conference, concluding, "There is no evidence that crystal healing works over and above a placebo effect."

Crystal healing effects could also be attributed to confirmation bias (which occurs when the believers want the practice to be true and see only things that back up that desire).

Crystal healing techniques are also practiced on animals, although some veterinary organizations, such as the British Veterinary Association, have warned that these methods are not scientifically proven and state that people should seek the advice of a vet before using alternative techniques.

Crystal healing proponents and 5G conspiracy theorists have falsely claimed that shungite may promote health by absorbing 5G radiation.

== See also ==
- Color healing
- Energy medicine
- Magnet therapy
