= Shunga, Republic of Karelia =

Village in Russia's Republic of Karelia

Shunga Шуньга
- Selo
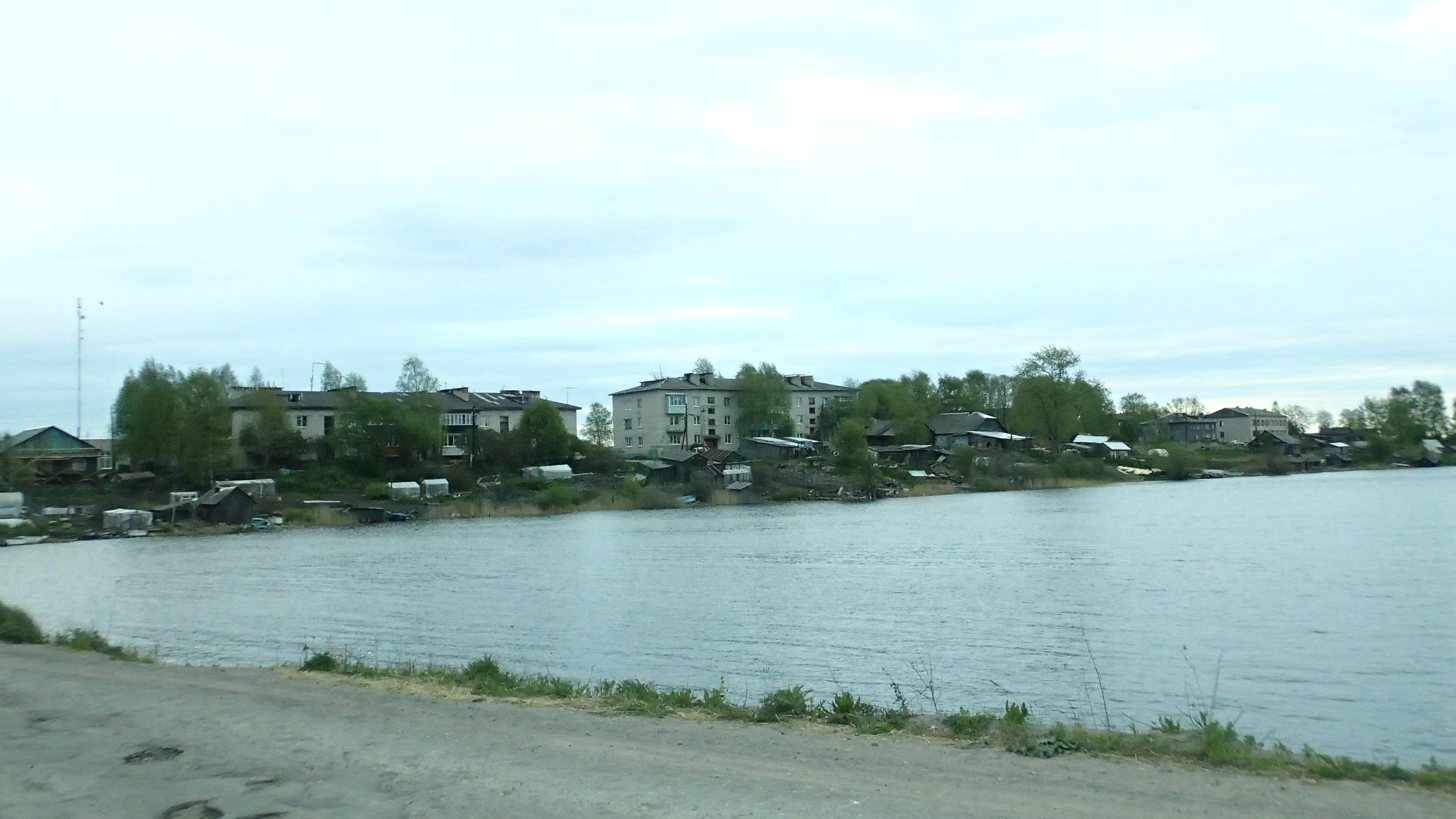
- Shunga village, Republic of Karelia. View from the side of the Putkozero
- Interactive map of Shunga
- Location of Shunga Shunga (Karelia)
- Coordinates: 62°35′N 34°56′E
- Country: Russia
- Federal subject: Republic of Karelia
- Administrative district: Medvezhyegorsky District

Population (2010 Census)
  - Total: 596
  - Estimate (2021): 510 (−14.4%)

Municipal status
  - Municipal district: Medvezhyegorsky Municipal District
  - Rural settlement: Shungskoye Rural Settlement
  - Capital of: Shungskoye Rural Settlement
- Time zone: UTC+3 (UTC+03:00)
- Postal code: 186304
- OKTMO ID: 86624470101

Shunga (Russian: Шуньга; Karelian: Šun’ga; Finnish: Sunku) is a large village in the Zaonezhye peninsula by Lake Putkozero in Russia's Republic of Karelia. It is part of Medvezhyegorsky District and is located around 50 km from the district capital, Medvezhyegorsk. The mineraloid shungite is named after this village as it was first described based on deposits found nearby.

== History ==
The first mention of the Shunga churchyard is contained in the list of the Chelmuzhsky bypass charter of 1375. In the 15th century, the village was a transshipment point on the way of transporting salt from the White Sea coast. Since the 18th century, the Shunga Fair, the largest in the Russian North, has become widely known. It was the main point of wholesale trade in food and industrial goods and was held four times a year — Epiphany (Epiphany) from January 6 to 18, the National Team from the first Sunday of Lent for 6 days, the Annunciation from March 25 to April 2, and Nikolskaya from December 6 to 12. Due to the construction of the Povenetsko—Shunga tract in 1880 and the Murmansk Railway in 1914, when salt, fish and game began to follow directly from the White Sea to St. Petersburg, the importance of fairs declined and by the 1930s fairs ceased to be held.

Between 1900-1908, at the expense of the merchant and philanthropist I. I. Krylov, who lived in Shunga, the Church of the Holy Virgin was restored after a fire, and the Shunga Nikolskaya almshouse of the spouses I. I. and P. Y. Krylov was built and equipped. In 1911, a bust of Tsar Alexander II was unveiled in Shunga due to the 50th anniversary of the emancipation reform of 1861 which had liberated the serfs. At the beginning of the 20th century, Shunga Hospital with 30 beds was opened.

In the 1910s and 1920s, a credit partnership, a cheese-making artel, and a consumer society operated in Shunga.

From 1927-1930 Shunga was the center of Shungsky district, and from 1930-1944 the center of Zaonezhsky district.

At the end of the 19th century, the products of zaonezhsky embroiderers became famous. In 1907, a Manual Labor Assistance Society was organized in the village, uniting 300 home-based embroiderers. In 1929, the Zaonezhskaya Embroidery artel was established, since the 2000s - the Karelian Patterns factory, specializing in the production of products made of natural fabrics decorated with traditional Zaonezhskaya embroidery.
