= Shungite =

Type of solid bitumen, or rock containing solid bitumen

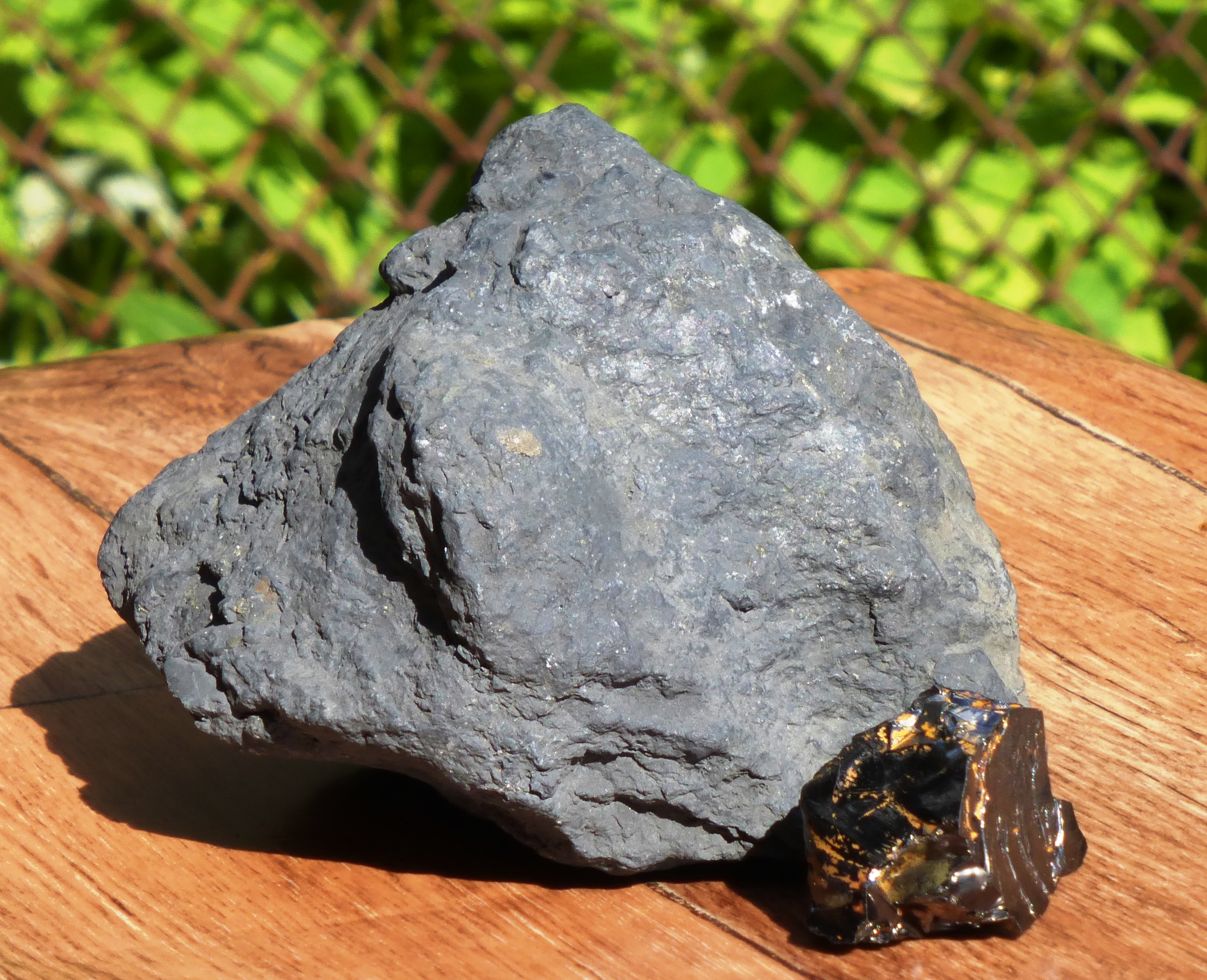
A shungite-bearing rock (left) and solid bitumen shungite (right)

Shungite is either a diverse group of metamorphosed Precambrian rocks all of which contain pyrobitumen, or the pyrobitumen within those rocks. Shungite was first discovered in Karelia, Russia, in a rock deposit near Shunga village (from where it gets its name).

Shungite, in recent times, has developed a reputation for a preponderance of pseudoscientific and quack claims about its uses in medicine and technology, where it is claimed to have properties ranging from nebulous health benefits to blocking 5G radiation.

== Occurrence ==
Shungite has mainly been found in Russia. The main deposit is in the Lake Onega area of Karelia, at Zazhoginskoye, near Shunga, with another occurrence at Vozhmozero. Two other much smaller occurrences have been reported in Russia, one in Kamchatka in volcanic rocks and the other formed by the burning of spoil from a coal mine at high temperature in Chelyabinsk. Other occurrences have been described from Austria, India, Democratic Republic of Congo and Kazakhstan.

== Terminology ==
The term "shungite" has evolved substantially since was originally used in 1879 to describe a black substance with more than 98% carbon found in veins near its type locality of Shunga. More recently the term has also been used to describe a wide variety of rocks containing similar carbon layers, leading to some confusion. In scientific usage, shungite refers to a mineraloid which contains >98% carbon, and is used as a modifier to the host-rock's name, i.e. "shungite-bearing dolostone". In popular usage, shungite-bearing rocks are sometimes themselves referred to as shungite. Shungite is subdivided into bright, semi-bright, semi-dull and dull on the basis of its lustre.

Shungite has two main modes of occurrence, disseminated within the host rock and as apparently mobilised material. Migrated shungite, which is bright (lustrous) shungite, has been interpreted to represent migrated hydrocarbons and is found as either layer shungite, layers or lenses near conformable with the host rock layering, or vein shungite, which is found as cross-cutting veins. Shungite may also occur as clasts within younger sedimentary rocks.

== Formation and structure ==
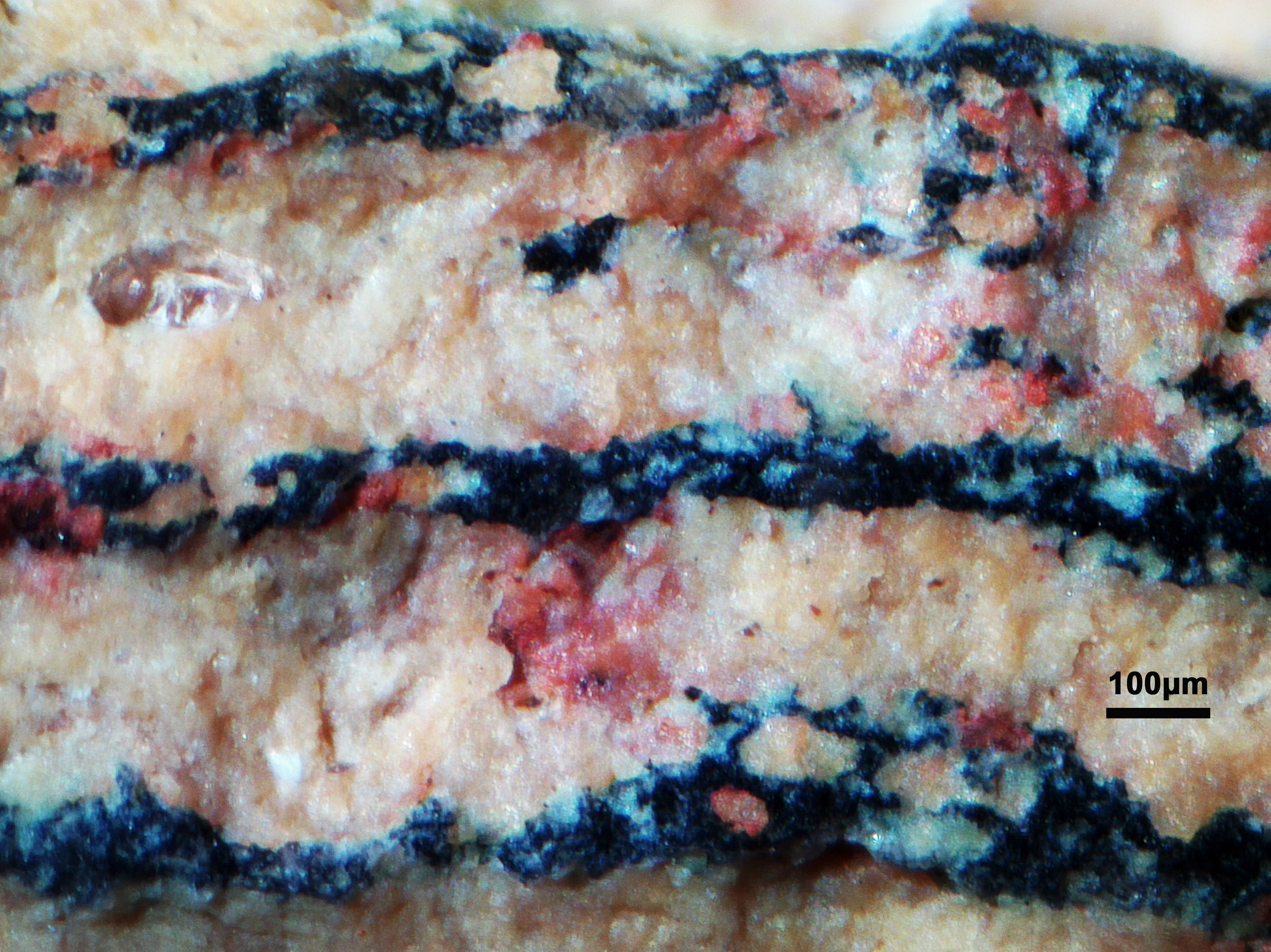
Dark layers made of shungite in a stromatolite, Franceville Basin, Gabon, Central Africa

Shungite had historically been regarded as an example of abiogenic petroleum formation, but its biological origin has now been confirmed. Non-migrated shungite is found directly stratigraphically above deposits that were formed in a shallow water carbonate shelf to non-marine evaporitic environment. The shungite-bearing sequence is thought to have been deposited during active rifting, consistent with the alkaline volcanic rocks that are found within the sequence. The organic-rich sediments were likely deposited in a brackish lagoon. The concentration of carbon indicates elevated biological productivity levels, possibly due to high levels of nutrients available from volcanic material.

Shungite-bearing deposits that retain sedimentary structures are interpreted as metamorphosed oil source rocks. Some mushroom shaped structures have been interpreted as possible mud volcanoes. Layer and vein shungite varieties, and shungite filling cavities and forming the matrix of breccias, are interpreted as migrated petroleum, now in the form of metamorphosed bitumen. Solid-bitumen shungite is predominantly amorphous, though as with many carbon deposits it contains trace amounts of carbon allotropes such as graphene sheets and fullerenes.

== Shunga deposit ==
The Shunga deposit contains an estimated total carbon reserve of more than 250 gigatonnes. It is found within a sequence of Palaeoproterozoic meta-sedimentary and meta-volcanic rocks that are preserved in a synform. The sequence has been dated by a gabbro intrusion, which gives a date of 1980±27 Ma, and the underlying dolomites, which give an age of 2090±70 Ma. There are nine shungite-bearing layers within the Zaonezhskaya Formation, from the middle of the preserved sequence. Of these the thickest is layer six, which is also known as the "Productive horizon", due to its concentration of shungite deposits. Four main deposits are known from the area, the Shungskoe, Maksovo, Zazhogino and Nigozero deposits. The Shungskoe deposit is the most studied and is largely depleted.

== Uses and pseudoscientific claims ==
Shungite has been used since the middle of the 18th century as a pigment for paint, and is currently sold under the names "carbon black" or "shungite natural black". In the 1970s, shungite was exploited in the production of an insulating material, known as shungisite. Shungisite is prepared by heating rocks with low shungite concentrations to 1,090–1,130 °C (1,990–2,070 °F) and is used as a low density filler. Shungite has applications in construction technologies. The presence of fullerenes has resulted in shungite being of interest to researchers as a natural reservoir, though shungite is not uniquely enriched in fullerenes compared to other carbon-rich rocks.

Shungite has been used as a folk medical treatment since the early 18th century. Peter the Great set up Russia's first spa in Karelia to make use of the purported water purifying properties of shungite. He also instigated its use in providing purified water for the Russian army. Crystal healing pseudoscience proponents and 5G conspiracy theorists have erroneously claimed that shungite may remove 5G radiation from their vicinity more efficiently than any material of similar electrical conductivity would do. Many of these claims frequently focus on the reputed benefits of fullerenes contained in shungite, which are found in concentrations of 1 to 10 parts per million. Despite its purported health benefits, shungite contains toxic heavy metals such as lead and cadmium and can pose a health risk when used as an alternative medicine.

== See also ==
- Hydrocarbon
- Oil shale
