= Diploma Bertha Lutz =

Award for gender equality and women's rights

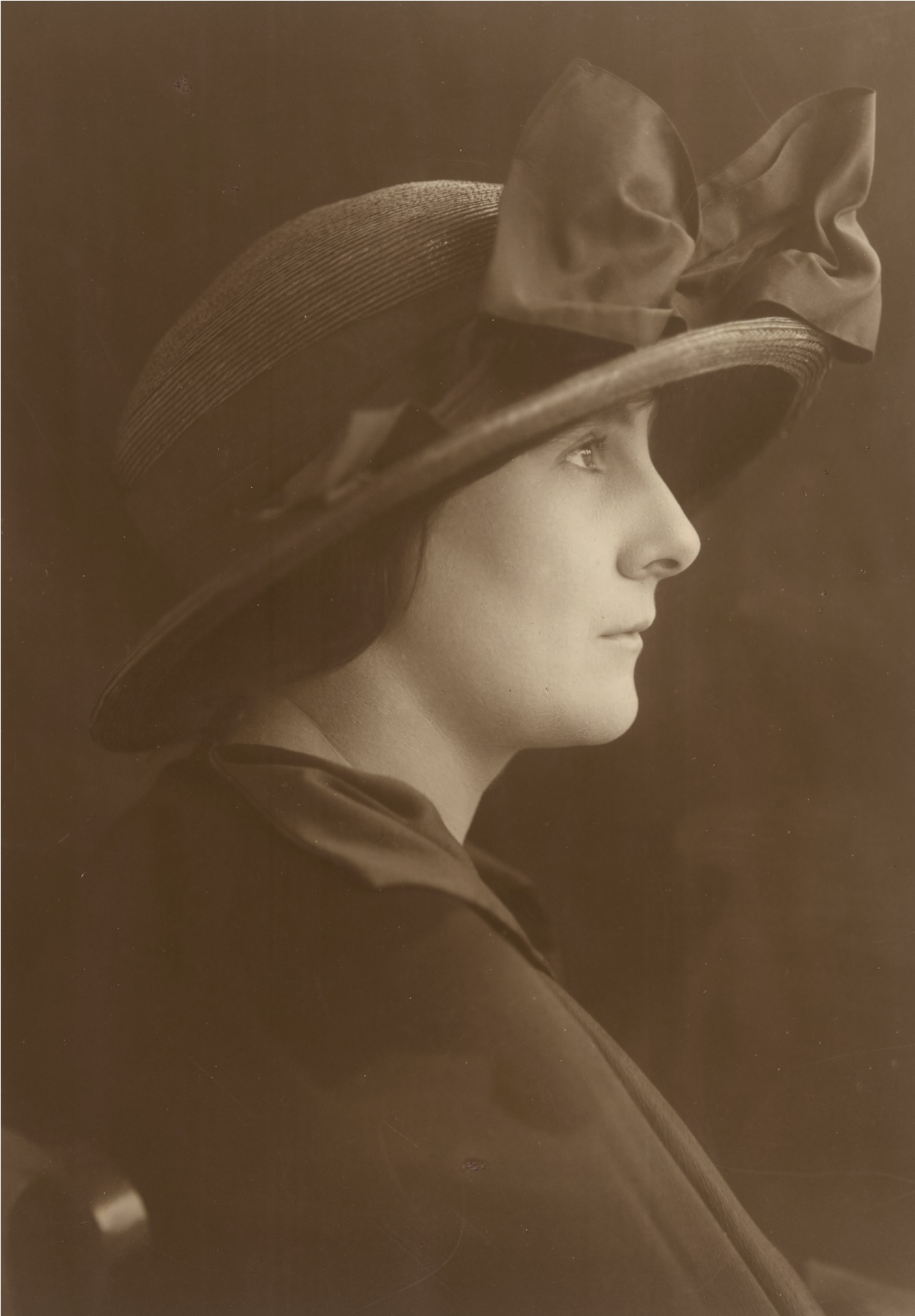
Bertha Lutz in her youth.

The Diploma Bertha Lutz (Bertha Lutz Diploma), also known as the Prêmio Bertha Lutz (Bertha Lutz Prize), was established by the Federal Senate of Brazil to recognize women who have made contributions to the defense of women's rights and gender issues in Brazil. It is named in honor of the Brazilian biologist and feminist leader Bertha Lutz.

The award was established by a 2001 resolution, based on an initial 1998 draft resolution presented by Senator Emília Fernandes. It is given annually during a special session of the Federal Senate as part of events for International Women's Day on March 8. Government entities or nongovernmental organizations can nominate candidates for the Diploma, and the nominations pass through the Board of the Federal Senate. The winners are selected by the Diploma Bertha Luz Council, composed of one representative from each political party within the Senate. The award traditionally recognized five women from different areas of expertise, although that number has increased in recent years.

== Honorees ==
=== 2002 ===
- Luiza Erundina, federal deputy (PSB-SP);
- Maria Berenice Dias, judge in Rio Grande do Sul;
- Maria Isabel Lopes, municipal secretary of Fortaleza;
- Heleieth Saffioti, sociologist and professor from São Paulo;
- Herilda Balduíno de Sousa, lawyer from the Federal District

=== 2003 ===
- Emília Fernandes, Minister of the Special Secretariat of Policy for Women;
- Raimunda Gomes da Silva, babassu nut breaker from Tocantins;
- Nair Jane de Castro Lima, domestic worker in Rio de Janeiro and founder of one of the first workers' associations in her field;
- Nazaré Gadelha, human rights lawyer in Acre;
- Sueli Carneiro, Afro-Brazilian and feminist activist in São Paulo.

=== 2004 ===
- Eva Sopher, president of the São Pedro Theatre in Porto Alegre;
- Maria Gleyde Martins Costa, of the State Council for the Defense of Women's Rights in Roraima;
- Mônica Maria de Paula Barroso, who works as a public defender in Fortaleza;
- Maria Aparecida Schumaher, of the Movement to Defend Women's Rights, in Rio de Janeiro;
- Zuleika Alambert, feminist, writer, and politician active in Santos, São Paulo

=== 2005 ===
- Clara Charf, of the National Council for the Rights of Women;
- Maria da Penha Maia Fernandes, pharmacist who fought for the conviction of her husband who tried to kill her, and who inspired the Lei Maria da Penha;
- Palmerinda Donato, journalist;
- Rozeli da Silva, street-sweeper, creator of the do Centro Infantil Renascer da Esperança to support children in need in Porto Alegre;
- Zilda Arns, coordinator of Pastoral da Criança (Pastoral Care for Children)

=== 2006 ===
- Elizabeth Altino Teixeira, member of the peasant leagues in Paraíba;
- Geraldina Pereira de Oliveira, rural worker from Pará;
- Rosmary Corrêa, lawyer and state deputy from São Paulo;
- Jupyra Barbosa Ghedini, federal civil servant;
- Raimunda Putani, Indigenous pajé healer from Acre

=== 2007 ===
- Mãe Beata de Iemanjá, ialorixá from Rio de Janeiro;
- Suely Batista dos Santos from Mato Grosso;
- Moema Libera Viezzer (Paraná);
- Maria Yvone Loureiro Ribeiro (Alagoas);
- Ivana Farina Navarrete Pena (Goiás)

=== 2008 ===
- Alice Editha Klausz;
- Maria dos Prazeres de Souza;
- Jandira Feghali;
- Mayana Zatz;
- Rose Marie Muraro

=== 2009 ===
- Lily Marinho;
- Sônia Maria Amaral Fernandes Ribeiro;
- Elisa Lucinda Campos Gomes;
- Neide Viana Castanha;
- Cléa Anna Maria Carpi da Rocha;
- Ruth Cardoso (in memoriam)

=== 2010 ===
- Leci Brandão da Silva;
- Maria Augusta Tibiriçá Miranda;
- Cleuza Pereira do Nascimento;
- Andréa Maciel Pachá;
- Clara Perelberg Steinberg;
- Fani Lerner (in memoriam);
- Maria Lygia de Borges Garcia (special honor)

=== 2011 ===
- Maria Liège Santos Rocha
- Chloris Casagrande Justen, educator, participant in the State Council of Education of Paraná, and affiliate with the NGO Soroptimista, which aims to provide services to improve the lives of women. Vice president of the Academia Brasileira de Letras' Paraná branch;
- Maria José da Silva, created the Residents Association of Conjunto Bento Ribeiro Dantas in Maré, in Rio de Janeiro, which works on socially inclusive recycling;
- Maria Ruth Barreto Cavalcante, psychopedagogue who studied pedagogy in Cologne, Germany, in the 1960s and was imprisoned by the military for training groups of university students to teach children literacy skills;
- Carmen Helena Ferreira Foro, first woman to become a manager in a trade union center in Brazil, as vice president of the Central Única dos Trabalhadores;
- Ana Maria Pacheco de Vasconcelos (in memoriam)

=== 2012 ===
- Dilma Rousseff, first woman president of Brazil;
- Maria Prestes, activist and widow of the communist leader Luís Carlos Prestes;
- Eunice Michiles, first woman elected as a senator in the history of Brazil;
- Rosali Scalabrin, representative of the Pastoral Land Commission;
- Ana Alice da Costa, professor associated with the political science department of the Federal University of Bahia, creator of an interdisciplinary postgraduate program on women's studies known as NEIM

=== 2013 ===
- Jô Moraes, federal deputy;
- Adélia Pessoa, educator;
- Amabília Almeida and Telma Ayres, activists;
- Luzia Santiago, missionary

=== 2014 ===
- Cristina Buarque, women's secretary of Pernambuco;
- Delaíde Arantes, minister of the Superior Labour Court;
- Magnólia Rocha, president of the Roraima League to Combat Cancer;
- Zezé Rocha, former state deputy of Bahia;
- Maria Lygia Maynard, president of the Associação de Pais e Amigos dos Deficientes Auditivos de Sergipe, an organization for supporters of the hearing impaired

=== 2015 ===
- Creuza Maria Oliveira
- Cármen Lúcia
- Clara Araújo
- Mary Garcia Castro
- Ivanilda Pinheiro Salucci
- Maria Elizabeth Teixeira Rocha
- Débora Martins Bonafé dos Santos (in memoriam)

=== 2016 ===
This was the first year the award was given to a man, Marco Aurélio Mello.

- Ellen Gracie Northfleet
- Lucia Regina Antony
- Luiza Helena de Bairros
- Lya Luft
- Marco Aurélio Mello

=== 2017 ===
- Denice Santiago
- Diza Gonzaga
- Isabel Cristina de Azevedo Heyvaert
- Raimunda Luzia de Brito
- Tatiane Bernardi Teixeira Pinto

=== 2018 ===
The 26 female deputies who from 1987 and 1988 participated in the process that concluded in the Constitution of Brazil were honored.

- Abigail Feitosa, in memoriam
- Anna Maria Rattes
- Benedita da Silva
- Bete Mendes
- Beth Azize
- Cristina Tavares, in memoriam
- Dirce Tutu Quadros, in memoriam
- Eunice Michiles
- Irma Passoni
- Lídice da Mata
- Lúcia Braga
- Lúcia Vânia
- Márcia Kubitschek, in memoriam
- Maria de Lourdes Abadia
- Maria Lúcia Melo de Araújo
- Marluce Pinto
- Moema São Thiago
- Myriam Portella
- Raquel Cândido
- Raquel Capiberibe
- Rita Camata
- Rita Furtado, in memoriam
- Rose de Freitas
- Sadie Hauache
- Sandra Cavalcanti
- Wilma de Faria, in memoriam

=== 2019 ===
There were 23 honorees this year, including judges, artists, artisans, activists, politicians, and professors:

- Alzira Soriano, in memoriam
- Ana Benedita de Serqueira e Silva
- Bibi Ferreira, in memoriam
- Delanira Pereira Gonçalves
- Eudésia Vieira, in memoriam
- Fabiane Maria de Jesus, in memoriam
- Gabriela Manssur
- Helena Heluy
- Helena Meirelles, in memoriam
- Heley de Abreu Silva Batista, in memoriam
- Hermínia Maria Silveira Azoury
- Iolanda Ferreira Lima
- Iracy Ribeiro Mangueira Marques
- Jaceguara Dantas da Silva
- Laélia de Alcântara, in memoriam
- Laissa Guerreira
- Leide Moreira, in memoriam
- Leiliane Silva
- Marcia Abrahão Moura
- Margarida Lemos Gonçalves, in memoriam
- Maria Esther Bueno, in memoriam
- Maria Lucia Fattorelli
- Marielle Franco, in memoriam

=== 2022 ===
In the Diploma Bertha Lutz's 20th anniversary year, after two years of interruption due to the COVID-19 pandemic, the award was given to 21 honorees:

- Ana Lara Camargo de Castro
- Andrea Gadelha
- Angela Salazar
- Eva Evangelista
- Filomena Camilo do Vale
- Flávia Arruda
- Flávia Cintra
- Heloísa Starling
- Ilda Peliz
- Inês Santiago
- Jocilene Barbosa
- Jurema Werneck
- Luiza Trajano
- Margareth Dalcolmo
- Michelle Bolsonaro
- Miracy Barbosa de Souza Gustin
- Mônica Sifuentes
- Renata Gil Alcantara
- Rosa Geane
- Ruth Almeida
- Wilma de Faria, in memoriam

=== 2023 ===
- Ilona Szabó de Carvalho
- Ilana Trombka
- Nilza Valéria Zacarias
- Rosa Weber
- Rosângela Silva
- Clara Filipa Camarão, in memoriam
- Glória Maria, in memoriam
