= Mãe Beata de Iyemanjá =

Brazilian Candomblé priestess and artist

Mãe Beata de Iemanjá
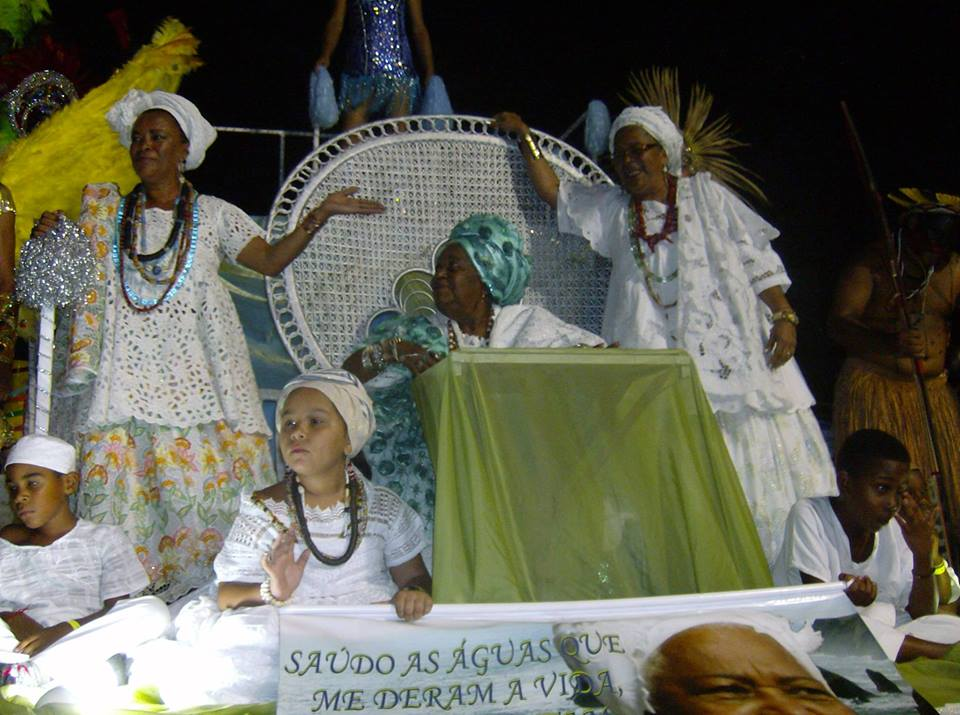
- Madre Beata de Yemayá on a GRES Garras do Tigre Carnival Float, 2014.
- Born: January 20, 1931; Cachoeira, Bahia
- Died: May 27, 2017 (aged 86); Nova Iguaçu, Rio de Janeiro
- Other name: Beatriz Moreira Costa

Beatriz Moreira Costa, known as Mãe Beata de Iemanjá (Cachoeira, Bahia 20 January 1931 – Nova Iguaçu, Rio de Janeiro 27 May 2017) was a Brazilian Candomblé priestess (mãe-de-santo), author, and artist who created works focusing on the defense and preservation of the environment, human rights, education, health, and the importance of combatting sexism and racism. She was the president of Criola, an Afro-Brazililan women's organization that worked to fight racism, sexism, and violence against women.

In 2010, the Brazilian Ministry of Human Rights and Citizenship recognized Mãe Beata for her work for racial equality, awarding her the government's highest prize for Human Rights contributions.

== Biography ==
Beatriz was born in Cachoeira, a town in the Bahian Recôncavo, in 1931. Her parents were Maria do Carmo and Oscar Moreira, a carpenter. From early childhood she was known as "Beata."

In the 1950s, Beata and her mother moved to the state capital Salvador to live with her Aunt Feliíssima and Uncle Anísio Agra Pereira. Living in the capital also gave Beata the opportunity to take theater courses and participate in folkloric groups, although her father discouraged her reading and writing. In 1956, Beata was initiated into the Candomblé community Ilê Maroiá Ladié, led by Olga de Alaketu.

While living in Salvador, Beata married Apolinário Costa. The couple had four children: Ivete, Maria das Dores, Adailton e Aderbal.

In 1969, Beata separated from her husband and moved with her children to Rio de Janeiro. To support her children Beata worked as a domestic servant, seamstress, manicurist, hairstylist, painter, and artisan. She also had a small role in the telenovela “Verão Vermelho” on the Rede Globo TV network.

On 20 April 1985, Beata founded the terreiro Ilê Omiojuarô in the Miguel Couto neighborhood of Nova Iguaçu.

Mãe Beata died at home on 27 May 2017, at 86 years of age, the day before she was to have received the Medalha Tiradentes (Tiradentes Medal), the highest honor from Rio de Janeiro's State Assembly (Portuguese, Alerj). Reflecting on this recognition just before her death, Mãe Beata said, "In the moment we're living through, this recognition of a woman who is Black, Northeastern, and a Ialorixá (the title for a supreme female leader in Candomblé) is truly meaningful. I appreciate it very much, but I cannot feel content amidst so much bad news about my community. This medal is not mine. It belongs to every gay, lesbian, every woman who has suffered violence, or who weeps in the hospital after her son has been shot, it belongs to my people, who do not have a voice or opportunities."

== Recognition for Human Rights Work ==
In 2007, the Brazilian Senate awarded Mãe Beata the Bertha Luz Prize for her work advocating for women's rights.

In 2014, Mãe Beata was honored by the samba school Garras do Tigre, in their carnival performance in Nova Iguaçu.

== Published Works ==
Although Beata's formal education only lasted until fourth grade, she was an avid reader and writer who emphasized the importance of preserving Afro-Brazilian oral knowledge.

- Caroço de dendê: a sabedoria dos terreiros: como ialorixás e babalorixás passam conhecimentos a seus filhos. Rio de Janeiro: Pallas, 2008.
- Histórias que a minha avó contava. São Paulo: Terceira Margem, 2004.
