= Pastor Sargento Isidório =

Brazilian politician and pastor (born 1962)

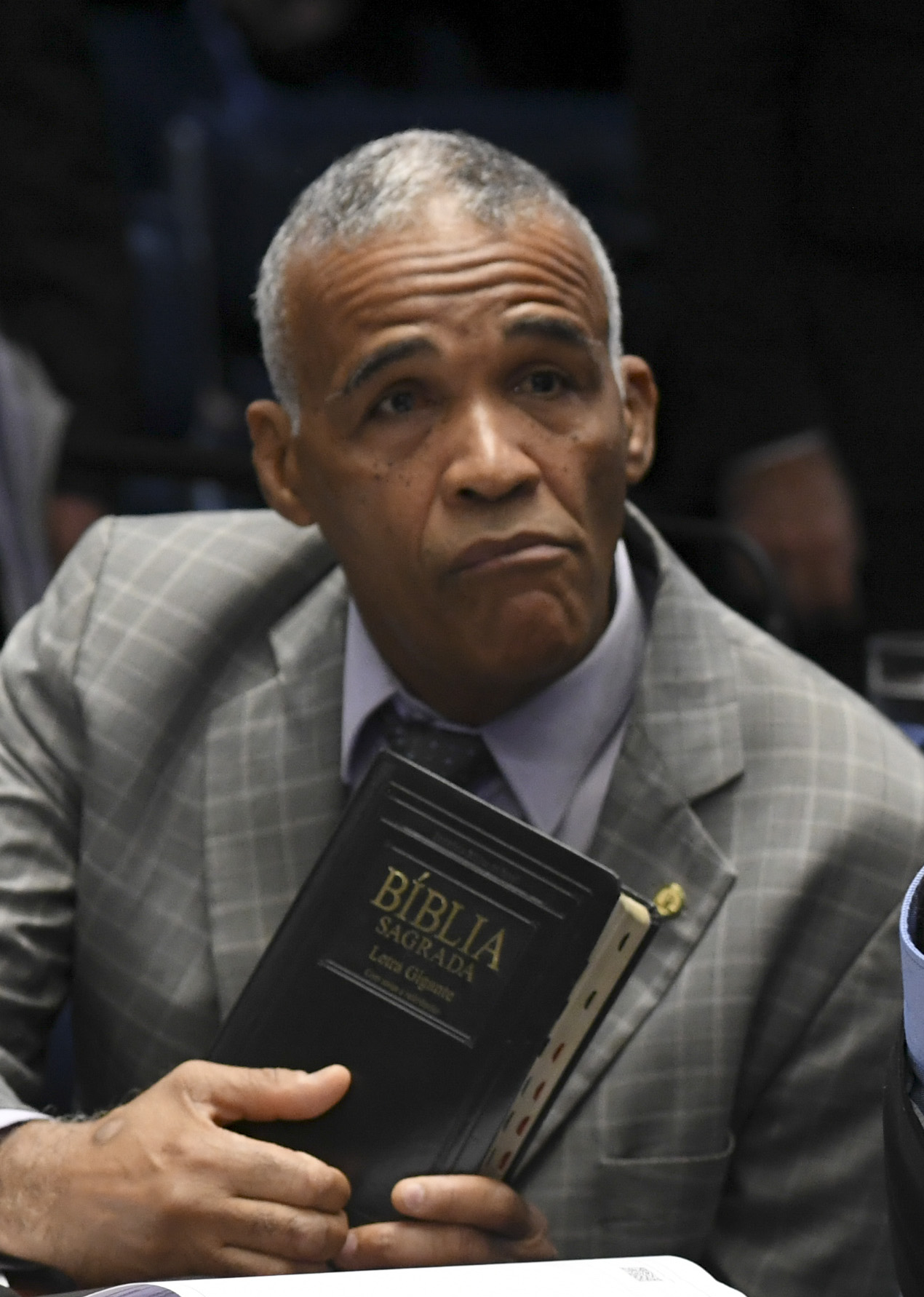
- Isidório in 2019

Member of the Chamber of Deputies
- Incumbent
- Assumed office 1 February 2019
- Constituency: Bahia

Member of the Legislative Assembly of Bahia
- In office 1 February 2003 – 1 February 2007
- Constituency: At-large
- In office 1 February 2011 – 1 February 2019
- Constituency: At-large

Personal details
- Born: Manoel Isidório de Santana Júnior; 28 July 1962 (age 64) Salvador, Bahia, Brazil
- Party: Avante (2018–present)
- Other political affiliations: PMDB (1998–1999); PT (1999–2005); PSC (2005–2009, 2013–2016); PSB (2009–2013); PDT (2016–2017)
- Children: 7, including João

Military service
- Allegiance: Brazil
- Branch/service: Military Police of Bahia State
- Years of service: 1981–2002
- Rank: Captain

Manoel Isidório de Santana Júnior (born 28 July 1962), also known as Isidório de Santana Júnior, Sargento Isidório, and Pastor Sargento Isidório, is a retired military police officer, Evangelical pastor, and politician. He has been a federal deputy from the state of Bahia since 2019, after having previously been a state deputy. He is currently affiliated with Avante.

== Biography ==
Isidório was born on 28 July 1962 in Salvador. His mother, Maria José dos Santos, was abandoned by his father, Manoel Isidório de Santana, also known as Seu Maneca, who worked at Petrobras. From 6 to 12 years old, he was abused by his cousin, an army corporal. Isidório began work at a young age, working initially as a trader at markets, and later being hired, in 1978, by Viação Auto Expresso Ipiranga to work as a fare collector on buses. He would later work as a professor of Afro-Brazilian folklore and dances. He completed technical nursing courses at the Instituto Municipal Luiz Viana Filho, in the city of São Francisco do Conde.

Isidório abandoned the Baptist church he had attended and began drinking and smoking. He also had relationships with various men while also having two wives simultaneously, with whom he had seven children. In 1981, he became a member of the Military Police of the State of Bahia, where he became a first sergeant, as well as a capoeira instructor. In 1991, after his conversion to pentecostalism and the Assemblies of God, Isidório created, in the city of Candeias, the Fundação Dr. Jesus, a social assistance organization to aid people addicted to drugs and alcohol.

While as a police officer, he came into the public conscious when he became known as one of the principal leaders of a strike by the military police of Bahia, which occurred in 2001 and is considered one of the largest strikes made by the military police in Bahia's history. As a consequence, he would be imprisoned for 14 days. In 2022, Isidório was promoted to captain, with a retroactive request made in January 2019 due to his length of service.

=== Political career ===
In 1998, then Sargento Isidório began his political career when he ran in the Bahian state elections that year to become a state deputy for the Brazilian Democratic Movement Party (PMDB), but was not elected. In 2000, he became a candidate for the Workers' Party (PT) for the mayoralty of Candeias, but again was not elected, earning 3rd place, or 20.21% of the vote.

While imprisoned during the protest, Isidório was left next to a dumping ground for chemical products that caused him to poisoned. He was taken to emergency care at a hospital, and the poisoning injured his vocal cords. The conditions of his imprisonment gained him considerable visibility and led to him being elected for the first time as a state deputy for the PT in 2002, going under the name Sargento Isidório. He became known during his time in office for being a deputy with a "folkloric" posture, including instances of him going to legislative sessions carrying a cylinder full of gas, referencing his campaign promises to lower the price of petroleum gas.

During the 2004 elections, while as a state deputy, Isidório became a candidate again for the mayoralty of Candeias, but lost the election with 10.52% of the vote. In 2006, he ran for reelection as part of the Social Christian Party (PSC), but was not reelected.

During the 2010 elections, he began to run as Pastor Sargento Isidório and was again elected as a state deputy to the Legislative Assembly of Bahia as part of the Brazilian Socialist Party. In 2012, he ran again to be the mayor of Candeias, coming in 5th place, with 4.85% of the vote.

He was reelected as state deputy in 2014 after he rejoined the PSC, a position he would stay in until 2019. During the 2016 municipal elections, Isidório ran to become mayor of Salvador for the Democratic Labour Party (PDT), coming in third place with 8.61% of the vote.

Having already retired from being a sergeant of the military police and now a pastor of the "Fundação Doutor Jesus", he ran for and became the most voted for federal deputy candidate from the state of Bahia in 2018 as part of Avante. He had also helped his son, João Isidório, be elected as a state deputy in Bahia. However, he drowned on 11 November 2021 while on a beach in Madre de Deus.

In 2020, Isidório ran again for the mayoralty of Salvador as part of Avante, but lost again, coming in third place with 5.33% of the vote, behind Denice Santiago of the PT and the winner, incumbent Bruno Soares Reis of DEM.

== Controversies ==
=== Views on prostate exams ===
In 2005, Isidório, then a deputy for the PT in the Bahia state assembly, was accused by fellow state deputy Targino Machado, who is a doctor, of having espoused rhetoric against prostate cancer prevention during his pronouncement in the legislative gallery. He had specifically spoke out against rectal examinations, a method routinely used by medical professionals during a prostate exam. Isidório denied these claims in a local newspaper in 2013, saying he was never against rectal examinations as a preventive procedure, and that his statements had been distorted by the local media.

=== Accusations of violations of human rights in care work ===
In 2012, a series of reports driven by Rádio Metrópole FM, based out of Salvador, accused an entity coordinated by Isidório, Fundação Dr. Jesus, of practices in violation of human rights to those under their care, particularly those with drug addiction, such as cutting access to food and corporal punishment against patients. These claims have been denied by the organization and by Pastor Sargento Isidório himself.

=== Views on LGBTQIA+ people ===
On 5 October 2013, while as a state deputy, Isidório announced his departure from the PSB after they rejected his proposal for a "Center for Straight People" within the party when he stated his personal "incompatibility" with the LGBTQIA+ activism within the PSB. The party had, at that time, already had established internal disciplinary processes against him for homophobic statements. He would join the PSC afterwards.

During the 2016 elections, as he was running for mayor, he declared himself to be ex-gay. In 2018, Isidório declared his vote for the PT candidate for president, Fernando Haddad, but had previously contemplated voting against him because he thought Haddad was gay, assumptions that were dispelled by Bahia's then governor Rui Costa (PT).

Singer Daniela Mercury, in November 2018, filed a lawsuit against Isidório for injuries after he had published a video on social media in which he harshly criticized her.
