= João Isidório =

Brazilian singer and politician (1992–2021)

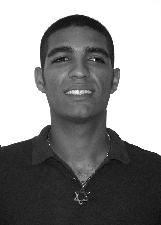

Member of the Legislative Assembly of Bahia
- In office 1 February 2019 – 11 November 2021

Personal details
- Born: João Paulo Santos de Santana; 26 January 1992; Candeias, Brazil
- Died: 11 November 2021 (aged 29); Madre de Deus, Brazil
- Political party: PCB (2011–2013); PSC (2013–2016); PROS (2016–2018); Avante (2018–2021)

João Paulo Santos de Santana (26 January 1992 – 11 November 2021) was a Brazilian singer and politician. A member of multiple political parties, most recently Avante, he served in the Legislative Assembly of Bahia from 2019 to 2021. His father is federal deputy Pastor Sargento Isidório. He drowned on 11 November 2021 while on a beach in Madre de Deus.
