= Candeias Oil Well (C-1) =

Oil well in Bahia, Brazil

- Poço de Petróleo de Candeias
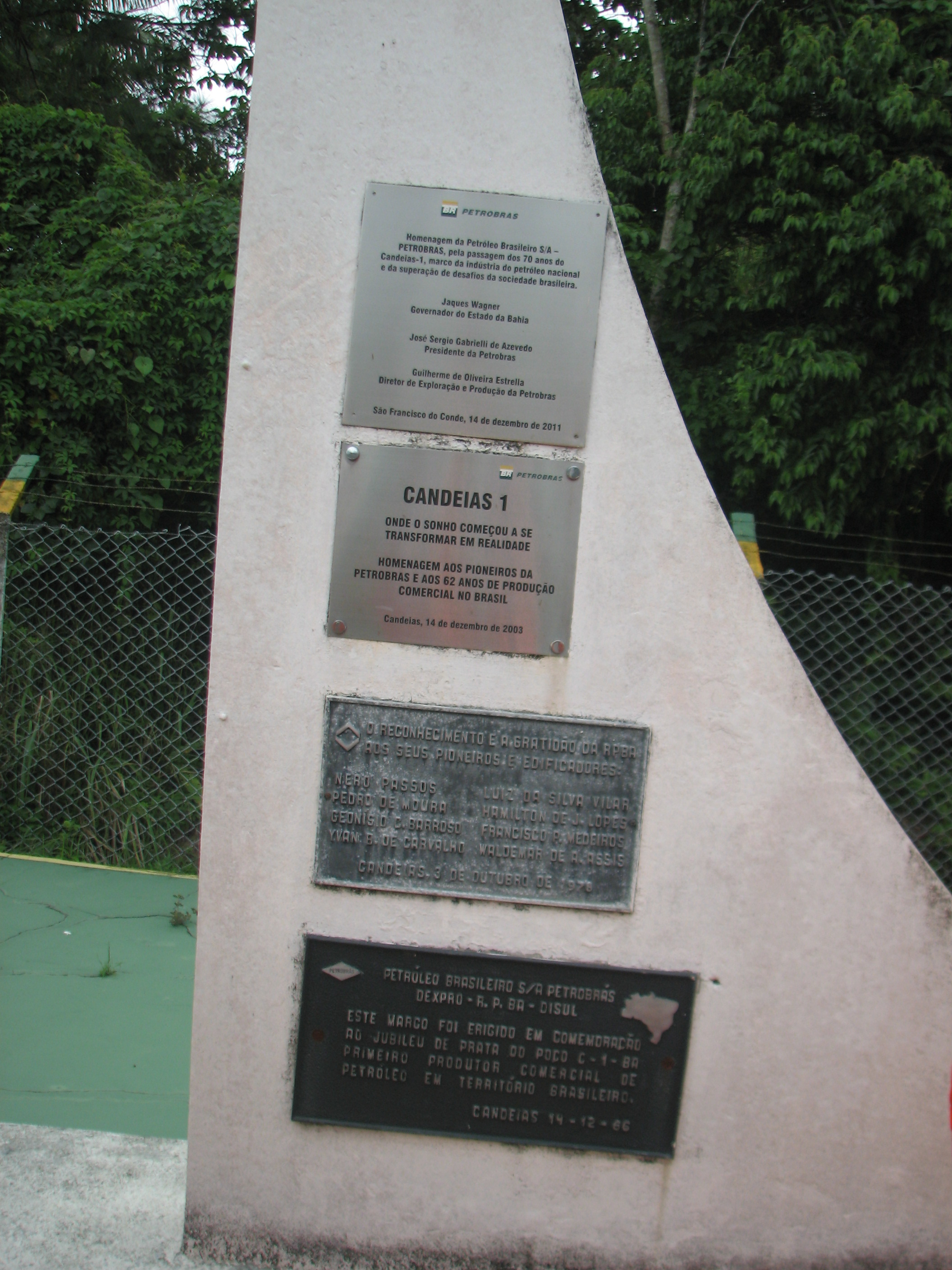
- Monument in honor of the Candeias Oil Well C-1
- Interactive map of the Candeias Oil Well area

General information
- Location: Candeias, Bahia; Brazil
- Coordinates: 12°42′18″S 38°34′00″W

The Candeias Oil Well (C-1), discovered on December 13, 1941, is located in the municipality of Candeias, in the interior of the state of Bahia.

== Context and discovery ==
Drilled on June 30, 1941, the Candeias Oil Well 1 (C-1) was the first commercial exploration well and the first oil field in Brazil. Previously, on January 21, 1939, a well had been discovered in Lobato, a district of Salvador, but it was not commercially exploited. Both used the same drilling machine. Work began on April 2, 1941, but drilling only took place in June and was completed on December 31, 1941.

The exploration of oil in Brazil dates back to the government of Pedro II, when he granted permission to the Englishman Thomas Denny Sargent to extract oil and other minerals in the south of Bahia. In 1892, drilling was carried out by Eugênio Camargo, who only managed to extract clayey sand. In 1907, the Mineralogical Service of Brazil joined the research and increased the areas under analysis.

== Landulpho Alves Refinery ==
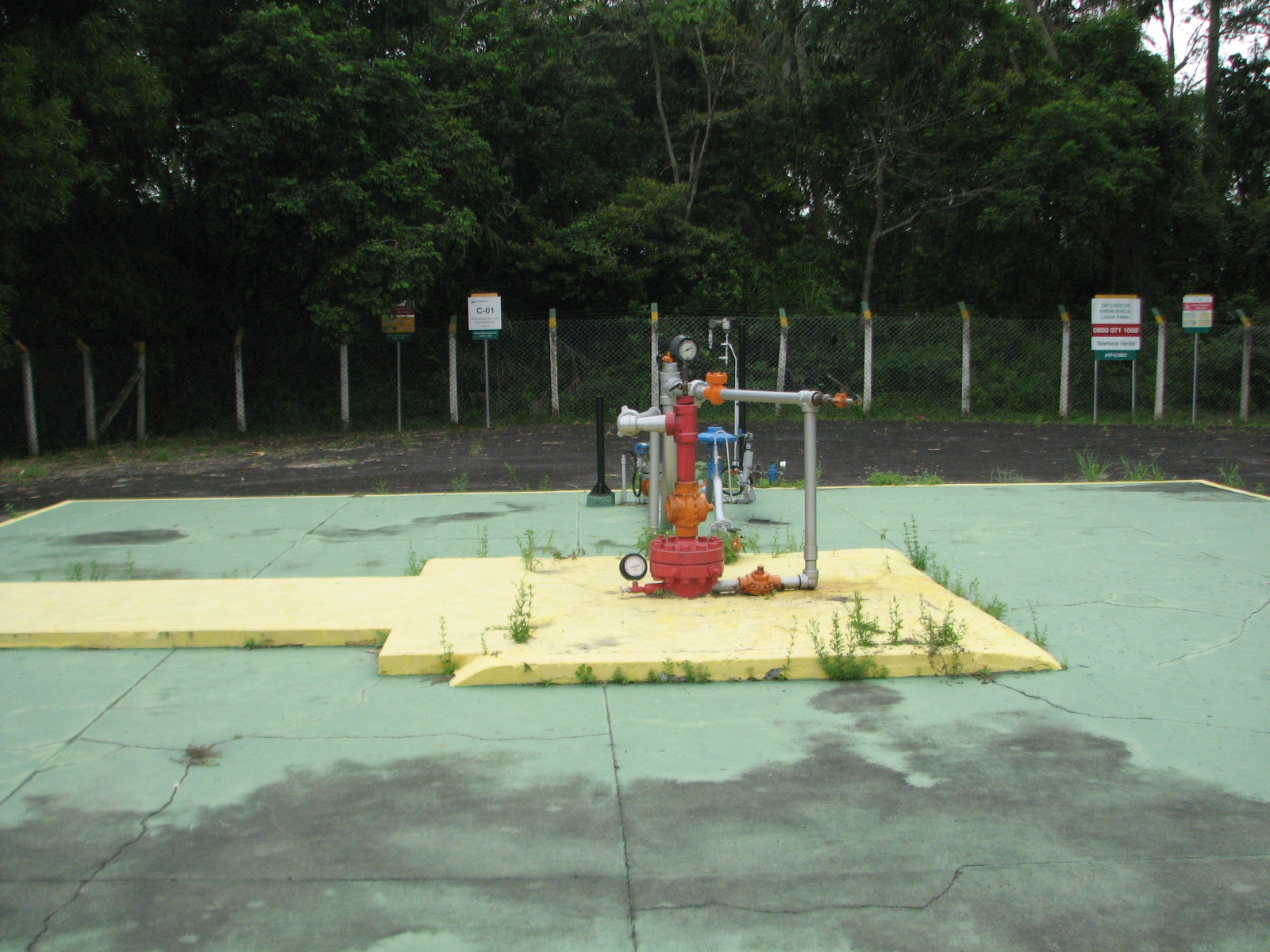
Well drilling site.

In the 1940s, the Bahia Oil Workers' Union (Sindipetro) reported that the discovery and development of oil in Candeias sparked the creation of a refinery. In 1950, the Landulpho Alves Refinery (now Mataripe Refinary), was set up in the municipality of São Francisco do Conde, near Candeias.

The increase in oil production led to the creation of the state-owned company Petrobras in 1953 by then president Getúlio Vargas, established after a popular campaign called "O Petróleo é Nosso" (English: Oil is Ours). Until 1965, Bahia was the only state in the country to produce oil. After the discovery of the first well, others were found in and around Candeias. C-2, found two months after C-1, produced up to 80 barrels a day, and by 1951, it had produced 22,768.03 barrels of oil and 75.515 barrels of gas. On June 23, 1952, President Getúlio Vargas visited Candeias, where he made his official speech in defense of the state oil monopoly and the creation of Petrobras.

== Monument ==
The well was listed as a historical landmark by the Artistic and Cultural Heritage Institute of Bahia (IPAC), the organization responsible for preserving Bahia's memory and culture, given its importance for the construction of Petrobras. Next to the well, Petrobras built a monument to commemorate and honor the first oil workers.

== See also ==
- Petrobras
