= Targino Machado =

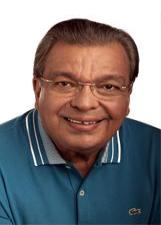

State deputy of Bahia
- In office 1 February 1995 – 1 February 2007
- In office 1 February 2011 – 28 October 2020

Mayor of São Gonçalo dos Campos
- In office 1989–1992

Personal details
- Born: Targino Machado Pedreira Filho; 4 September 1952 (age 72); Salvador, Bahia, Brazil
- Political party: PDT (1988–1998); PMDB (1998–2006); PSC (2010–2013); DEM (2013–2016); PPS (2016–2019); DEM (2019–2021)

Targino Machado Pedreira Filho (born 4 September 1952) is a Brazilian doctor, businessman, and politician. He was a state deputy from the state of Bahia from 1995 to 2007, and again from 2011 to 2020. Prior to this, he served as the mayor of São Gonçalo dos Campos from 1989 to 1992.

In 2005, Machado accused fellow state deputy Pastor Sargento Isidório, then a member of the Workers' Party (PT), of having espoused rhetoric against prostate cancer prevention during his pronouncement in the legislative gallery. He had specifically spoke out against rectal examinations, a method routinely used by medical professionals during a prostate exam. Isidório denied these claims in a local newspaper in 2013, saying he was never against rectal examinations as a preventive procedure, and that his statements had been distorted by the local media.

He was reelected in 2018 as part of the Democratas (DEM) with 67,164 votes. His mandate, however, was revoked by TSE on 6 October 2020 due to having still performed medical appointments during the 2018 elections, and as a result his votes were annulled.
