= Denice Santiago =

Brazilian police officer

Denice Santiago Santos do Rosário
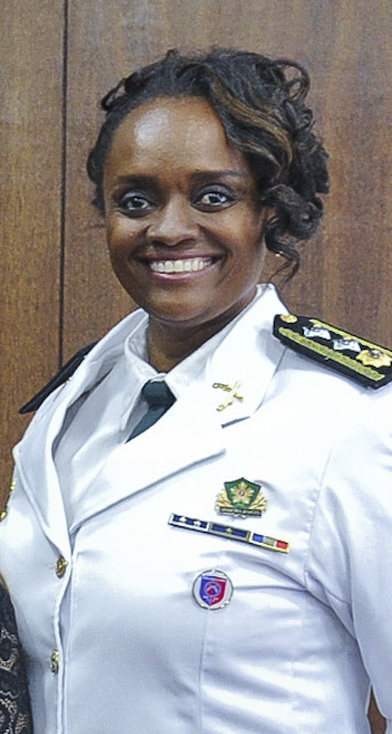
- Denice Santiago when she received the Diploma Bertha Lutz in 2017
- Born: 17 April 1971 (age 55); Salvador, Bahia, Brazil
- Education: Federal University of Bahia (UFBA)
- Occupation: Military police officer
- Employer: Military Police of Bahia
- Known for: Support to women facing domestic violence
- Title: Lieutenant-Colonel

Denice Santiago Santos do Rosário (born 1971) is a Lieutenant-Colonel in the Brazilian military police force. She was the creator of Ronda Maria da Penha, a programme of the Military Police of Bahia (PMBA) aimed at combatting domestic violence. An active opponent of racism, she has also run unsuccessfully for elections as a representative of the Workers' Party. In 2017 she was one of the five recipients of the Diploma Bertha Lutz, named after Bertha Lutz a prominent Brazilian feminist. The award was given for her role in defending women's rights.

== Early life and education ==
Santiago was born in Salvador, Bahia on 17 April 1971 to a low-income family, the third of five children. Her parents were Doberval Antônio do Rosário and Cleonice Santiago Santos do Rosário. She was encouraged by her father to enter the military police after completing high school in 1990, because it would provide her with a reliable income. She began her career in the PMBA at the age of 18, part of the first group of women to be admitted. She obtained a bachelor's degree in public security at the military police academy in 1995. Santiago later graduated in psychology and then obtained a master's degree in territorial development and social management from the Federal University of Bahia (UFBA). She also took a number of other courses, such as on cognitive behavioural therapy at the Federal University of São Paulo (UNIFESP) and on assistance to women victims of violence, at the National Secretariat of Public Security (SENASP).

== Career ==
Among Santiago's activities have been helping to transform underprivileged boys into traffic educators, establishing the Ronda da Maria da Penha in Bahia and creating a project that takes police officers to talk to men in communities with a high rate of violence against women. She also created Espelho, a board game for women to understand the violence they suffer on a daily basis. Santiago was promoted to the rank of major in 2016, being the only black woman holding such a rank, and to Lieutenant-Colonel in May 2023.

The Ronda da Maria da Penha was created by Santiago in 2015 and she became its commander. Becoming known as the Salvadoras de Maria, it was inspired by a similar organization in Rio Grande do Sul, Brazil. This multidisciplinary team aims to protect women victims of domestic and family violence; monitor compliance with court orders granted by judges; and make periodic, weekly, or monthly visits to monitor the situation of the women. As of March 2021, more than 5,700 women had been assisted and around 200 arrests had been made. Most police officers participating in this group are women. Since the establishment of the Ronda da Maria da Penha, Santiago has also trained officers from other states in Brazil on how to carry out similar activities.

== Politics ==
In 2020 she left the PMBA to run for mayor of Salvador as a candidate of the Workers' Party. She was chosen as the party's candidate by defeating former minister Juca Ferreira and sociologist Vilma Reis. She was unsuccessful in the election for mayor, coming second, ahead of Pastor Sargento Isidório of Avante, but losing to incumbent Bruno Soares Reis of DEM. In the 2022 General Elections, she ran for election to the Federal Chamber of Deputies but was not elected.

Santiago has also been active in addressing sexism within the military police force, which had tended to assign women more menial roles that were seen as traditional for women, even though their qualifications were the same as those of their male counterparts. She has noted that the structure of the military institution is not set up to receive women. In 2006 she created the Maria Felipa Reference Centre to improve the working conditions of women in the police.

== Awards and honours ==
Santiago's awards have included:

- Maria Quitéria Commendation, 2017
- Bertha Lutz Diploma, 2017
- Commendation July 2, 2018
