= Maria Aparecida Schumaher =

Brazilian pedagogue and feminist

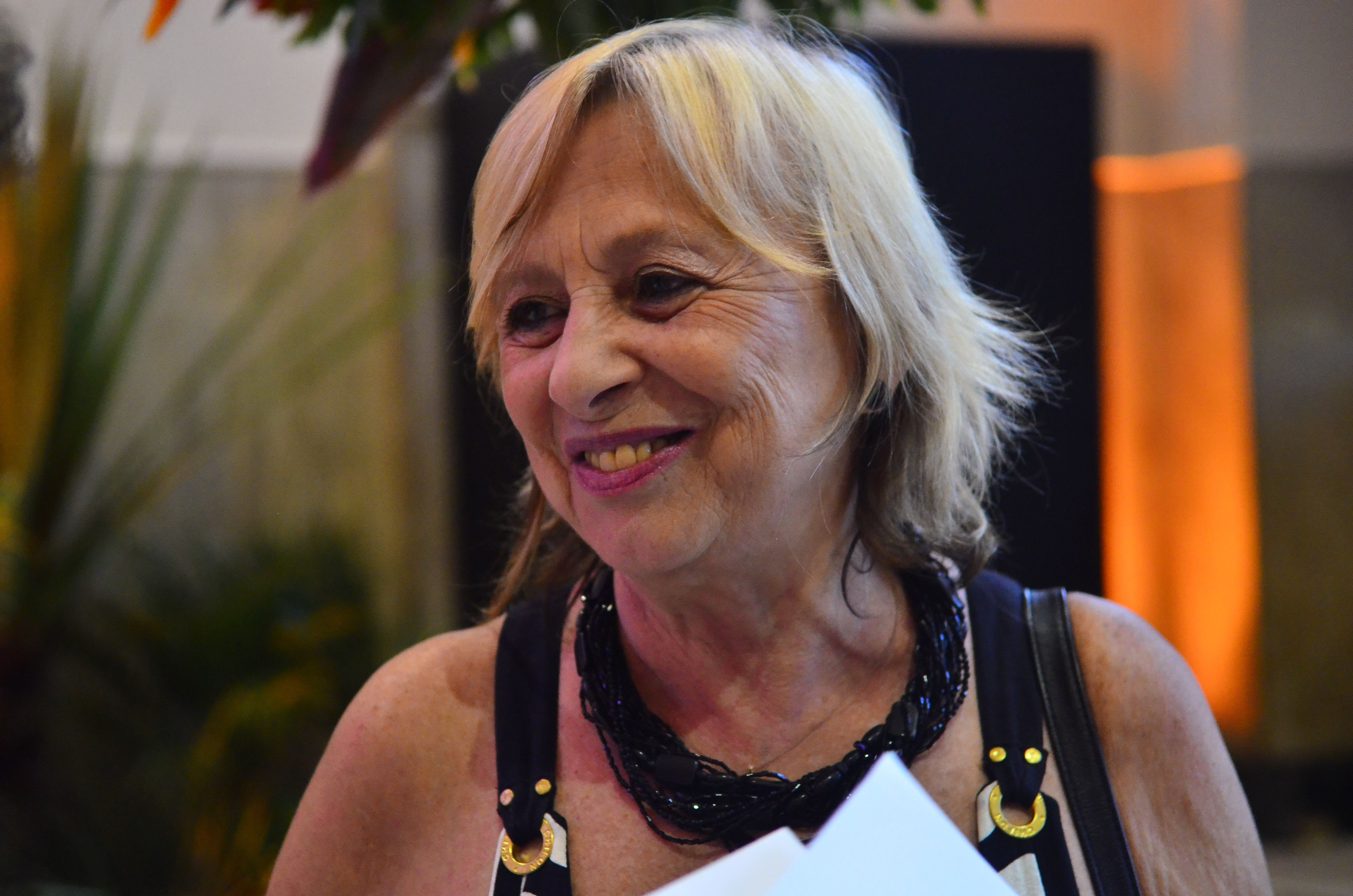
Schuma Schumaher (Credit: Tomaz Silva/Agência Brasil)

Maria Aparecida Schumaher,, known as Schuma, is a Brazilian pedagogue and feminist.

== Biography ==
Shuma participated of the women's rights movement since the 1970 decade. As coordinator for the NGO Redeh (Rede de Desenvolvimento Humano - Human Development Network), she organized the Dicionário Mulheres do Brasil (Dictionary of Brazilian Women), collecting entries about 900 women who impacted Brazilian history. She also coordinated the campaign "Quem ama abraça - Fazendo escola", denouncing the violence against women. She was also director of the Articulação de Mulheres Brasileiras (AMB).

In 2004, Shuma was awarded the Bertha Lutz Diploma, bestowed by the Brazilian Senate.

== Works ==
- 2000 - Dicionário mulheres do Brasil (with Erico Teixeira Vital Brazil) - Zahar
- 2004 - Gogó de Emas: a participação das mulheres na história do Estado de Alagoas - Imprensa Oficial (São Paulo)
- 2006 - Mulheres negras do Brasil (with Erico Teixeira Vital Brazil) - Senac
- 2015- Mulheres no Poder- trajetórias na política a partir da luta das sufragistas (with Antonia Ceva)-Edições de Janeiro
