= Clara Charf =

Brazilian women's rights activist (1925–2025)

Clara Charf (July 17, 1925 – November 3, 2025) was a Brazilian political activist.

== Life and career ==
Charf was born in Maceió on July 17, 1925. She joined the Brazilian Communist Party at the age of 21. In 1946, she moved to Rio de Janeiro, where she intended to become an airline pilot; however, as there were no female pilots, she became a stewardess at Aerovias Brasil.

During the 1940s, she met Carlos Marighella, and she left her job to work in the Chamber of Deputies. She began a romantic relationship with Marighella; however, her father forced her to return home, burned her documents, and caused her to flee, taking refuge in the house of Congresswoman Adalgisa Rodrigues Cavalcanti.

In 1948, she married Marighella, and they went to live in Méier, before relocating to São Paulo where she began working with the São Paulo Women's Movement. When Marighella travelled to China in 1952, Charf was imprisoned for communist activities, but was shortly thereafter released due to habeas corpus judging that having communist material was not a crime.

Marighella was killed in 1969, causing Charf to leave Brazil in 1970, exiling herself in Cuba, where she remained under a false identity working as a translator for nine years, also volunteering in the field on weekends. With the enactment of the Amnesty Law in 1979, Charf returned to Brazil.

In 2005, Charf received the Diploma Bertha Lutz. In 2019, the Municipal Chamber of São Paulo granted Charf the title of citizen of São Paulo.

Clara Charf was portrayed by Adriana Esteves in the 2019 biographical film Marighella.

Charf died on November 3, 2025, at the age of 100.
