= Vilma Reis =

Afro-Brazilian academic and activist

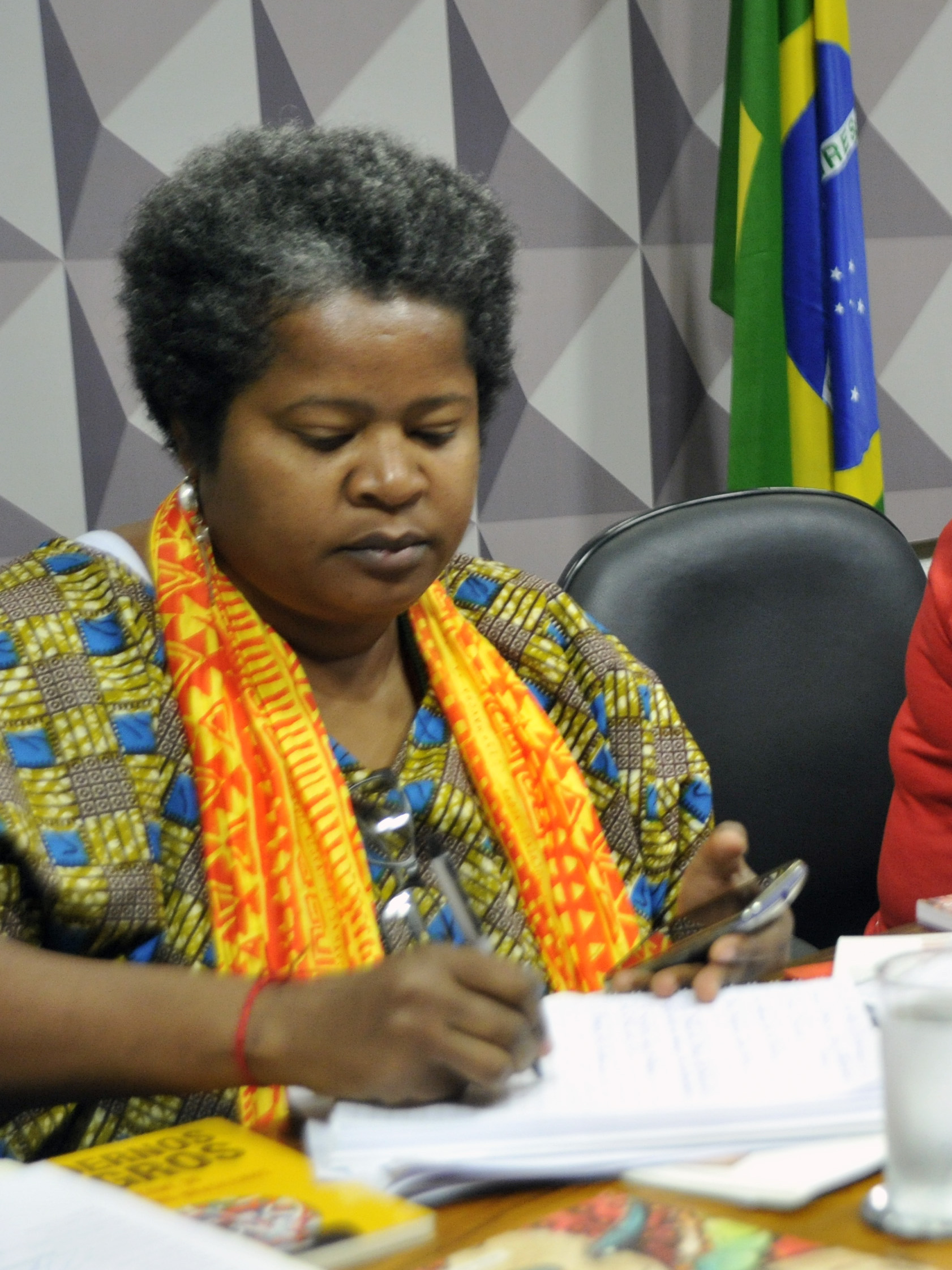
- Born: 28 October 1969 (age 56); Salvador, Bahia, Brazil
- Occupation: Sociologist
- Employer: Federal University of Bahia (UFBA)
- Known for: Campaigning for rights of women and black youth

Vilma Maria dos Santos Reis (born 1969) is a Brazilian sociologist and activist. She is a defender of human, women's, black, youth and LGBT rights. She is a teacher at the Federal University of Bahia (UFBA) and from 2015 to 2019 she held the position of General Ombudsman of the Public Defender's Office of the State of Bahia. Reis is also a member of the editorial board of Brasil 247, a website and TV station, which describes itself as an independent and progressive news source.

== Early life and education ==
Reis was born in Salvador, Bahia on 28 October 1969, the daughter of Wilson Ramiro dos Reis and Aurelina dos Santos Reis. She spent her childhood with her grandmother, Mariola Reis, in the city of Nazaré das Farinhas, near to Salvador. At the age of 13, she moved to Salvador to study at the Colégio Central da Bahia and to help her father, who worked as a stall holder at street festivals. She worked as a maid while studying. As a student, she became actively involved with the student movement at UFBA. She obtained a bachelor's degree in sociology, a master's degrees in social sciences and a doctorate in ethnic and African studies, all from the Faculty of Philosophy and Human Sciences of UFBA.

== Career ==
Reis has worked as a teacher and researcher, initially at the University of the State of Bahia (UNEB) and then in projects at the UFBA Human Resources Centre (CRH) and in the programmes A Cor da Bahia (UFBA) and CEAFRO, an education program for racial and gender equality created in 1995 by the Centre for Afro-Oriental Studies (CEAO) at UFBA, for which she served as executive coordinator between 2005 and 2010. As a researcher at CRH, she participates in the Race and Democracy project in the Americas, which promotes academic exchange between Brazilian and American researchers. In her academic research, she addresses violence, focusing on the debate on public security and racism and violence in police action in Salvador, where a high proportion of murders are of black men.

== Activism ==
In the early 1990s, Reis joined the Collective of Black Women of Bahia and has since remained close to black movement organizations, such as the Union of Blacks for Equality (UNEGRO) and the National Coordination of Black Entities (CONEN). She acted as coordinator of the Salvador Women's Forum between 1996 and 1999, and was a member of the organizing committee of the 12th National Feminist Meeting, held in Salvador in 1997. She was selected to participate in the Afro-Brazilian Community Development Women's Training Project program, held in 1998 in Washington, D.C. She was involved with the preparation of the National Policy Plan for Women by the federal Secretariat of Policies for Women, between 2009 and 2011. In 2020 she contributed to the founding of Coletivo Mahin – Organization of Black Women, which calls itself an anti-capitalist, anti-racist, anti-colonial, popular and left-wing movement.

Reis was involved with the Public Defender's Office of the state of Bahia from its creation in 2009. She initially participated in the legal assistance advisory board. In 2015, she was elected general ombudsman of the body, a position she held until 2019. She has contributed to the "popular-defenders" course of the Public Defender's Office, which updates women on topics such as rights of women and human rights. She also served as president of the National Council of Ombudsmen for Public Defenders.

== Politics ==
In December 2019, she was one of three candidates seeking the nomination of the Workers' Party to be the party's candidate for the 2020 election for mayor of Salvador. However, the candidate chosen by the party was Denice Santiago, who went on to lose the election to Bruno Soares Reis, candidate of the Brazil Union party (União). In 2022, in the general elections, she ran for election as a Federal Deputy and was again unsuccessful.
