= São Pedro Theatre =

Coordinates: 30°1′55.34″S 51°13′49.28″W

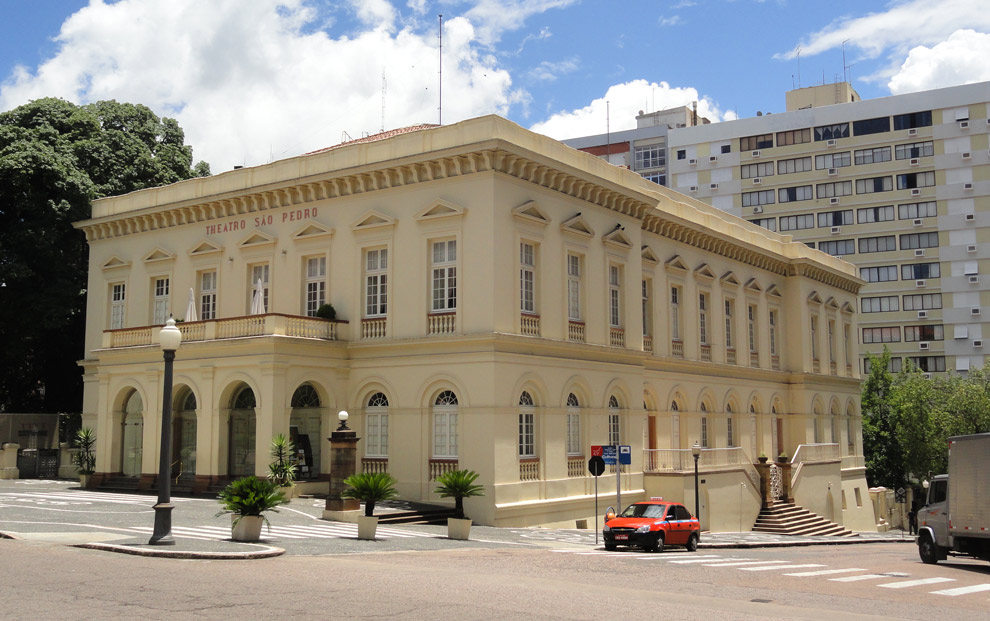
- São Pedro Theatre
- Interactive map of São Pedro Theatre
- Current use: Theatre

Construction
- Opened: 1858
- Reopened: 1984

The São Pedro Theatre (Theatro São Pedro in Portuguese) is the oldest theatre in the city of Porto Alegre, the state capital of Rio Grande do Sul, Brazil.

== History ==
Founded in 1858, the theatre quickly became an artistic, social, and political center in the country.

In the 1970s it was realised that the theatre was in need of a major renovation. Eva Sopher who had run many artistic endeavours in Porto Alegre for the organisation PROARTE was chosen by the government to lead the project. The renovation was to take nine years and became Soper's life's work. The theatre reopened in 1984.

Soper was to run the theatre for 41 years (the rest of her life). In 1991 there was a challenge to her leadership but admirers including the Brazilian director and actor Bete Coelho gathered to hold hands around the theatre to show their support.

Further extensions to the theatre's facilities had been started by Soper with a budget of R$20m but the estimated costs rose to R$50m. Although still not complete in 2018 the project had delivered a car park, rooms for administration, a new restaurant and a music salon.

Soper died in 2018. José Ivo Sartori who was Governor of Rio Grande do Sul declared three days of mourning.

An 18,000 square metre community complex was named after Eva Soper.
