= Eunice Michiles =

Brazilian politician (born 1929)

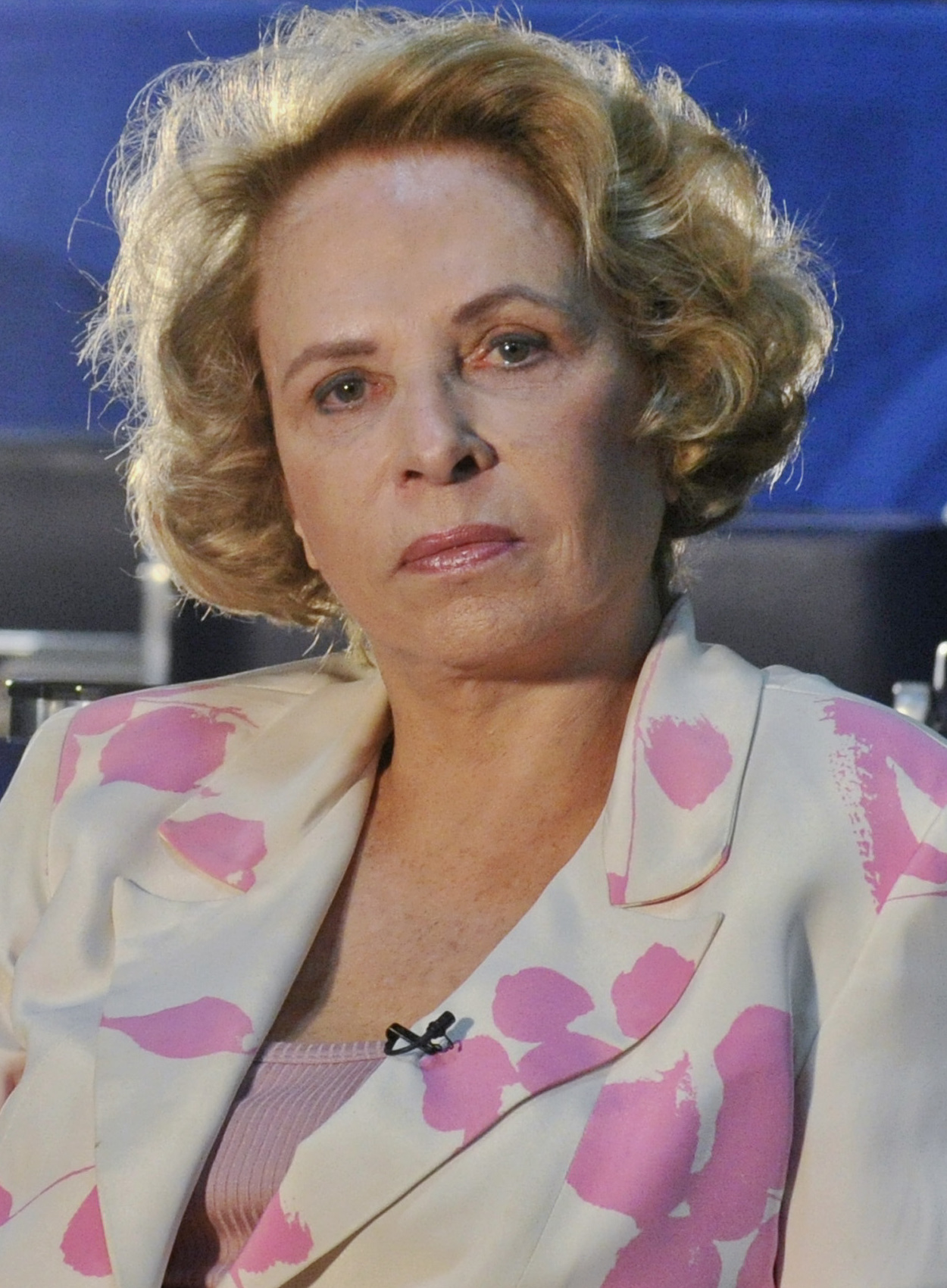
- Eunice Michiles in 2015

Federal Deputy for Amazonas
- In office 1 February 1987 – 31 January 1991

Senator for Amazonas
- In office 12 May 1979 – 31 January 1987

State Deputy of Amazonas
- In office 1 February 1975 – 31 January 1979

Personal details
- Born: June 10, 1929 (age 97) São Paulo, São Paulo, Brazil
- Party: ARENA (1974-1979); PDS (1980-1986); DEM (1986-1990); PDC (1990-1991); PL (1991-present)
- Children: Darcy Humberto Michiles

Eunice Mafalda Michiles (born June 10, 1929) is a Brazilian writer, teacher and politician. In 1979, she took office as Senator for Amazonas, being the first woman to take office in the Federal Senate after Princess Isabel of Brazil.

She was Federal Deputy for Amazonas between 1987 and 1991 by Liberal Front Party (PFL), participating of the 1988 Constituent Assembly.

== Personal life ==
Michiles is a member of the Seventh-day Adventist Church. Darcy Humberto Michiles (PL) is her son.
