= Olga de Alaketu =

Brazilian Candomblé high priestess

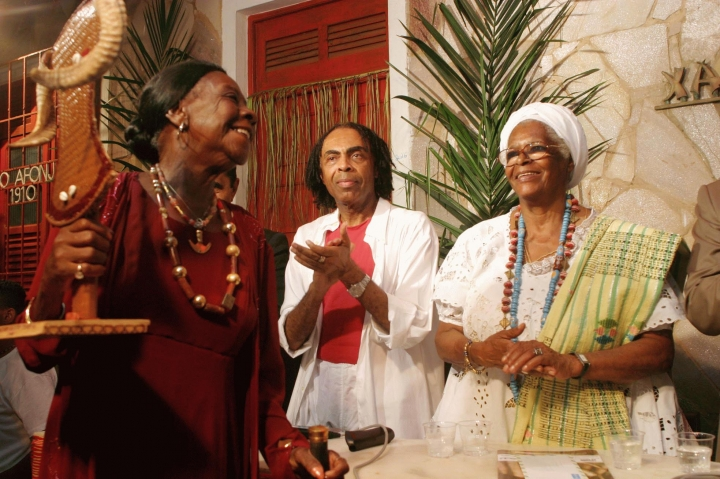
- Mother Olga de Alaketu, Gilberto Gil, Brazil's Minister of Culture, Mother Stella de Oxóssi
- Born: 1925; Salvador de Bahia, Brazil
- Died: 29 September 2005 (aged 80); Salvador de Bahia, Brazil
- Occupations: Iyalorisha, Spiritual and Community Leader
- Title: High Priestess of Candomblé

Olga de Alaketu or Mother Olga (c.1925 – September 29, 2005) was a prominent Candomblé high priestess, who was influential in promoting the African diasporic religion Candomblé and distancing it from Catholicism.

== Early life and career ==
Iya Olga de Alaqueto was born in Salvador de Bahia in 1925, a descendant of the Aro royal family of the city of Ketu in West Africa.

Iya Olga was designated as spiritual leader of the Alaqueto Candomblé community (one of the oldest Candomblé traditional houses in Salvador de Bahia) at the age of 24, a duty which she kept as beloved, knowledgeable and respected spiritual Mother during her whole life.

Iya Olga epitomised and perpetuated the customs and traditions of Yoruba culture, while actively participating in the Brazilian society.

=== Ancestry, early life and career ===
Iya Olga descended from a princess of the royal house Aro of Ketu (in modern Benin), who had been kidnapped and abducted to Bahia between c. 1636 and the end of the 18th century.

Iya Olga was appointed as the spiritual leader of the Ile Maroia Laji Candomblé temple in Salvador da Bahia, Brazil, one of the oldest Candomblé temples in the country. This temple attracted many prominent people including the writer Jorge Amado, and the French anthropologist ger.

When the Ile Maroia Laji temple was declared a national heritage site, Cultural Minister Gilberto Gil said of Alaketu, "In the last forty years, we can consider Mother Olga as the greatest proponent of the religion of the Orishas in all Brazil."

== Ketu Nation and Olga ==
The Ketu nation (localisation of cultural origin) into which Olga de Alaketu was born has a long history of religious oral tradition. Alaketu refers to an Afro-Brazilian spiritual centre, known as Ilê Maroiá Laji, in the Matatu district of Salvador de Bahia, one of the oldest of its kind. It was founded by Otampê Ojaró in the early 1600s. Anthropologist Vivaldo da Costa Lima, the first scholar to take interest in the history of the temple, supports this. “Lima gave credence to the memory of Otampê Ojaró's ethnic origin, showing that the temple's nickname, Alaketu, is probably a variant of the Yoruba Ara Ketu (people from Ketu), also noting that the surname Ojaró is a variant of Aro, one of Ketu's royal lineages”. One notable characteristic of the religious tradition of the Ketu is its separation from the Catholic traditions of European colonizers. Olga da Alaketu was actually born into this Afro-Brazilian religious tradition in 1925. She died from complications caused by diabetes on September 29, 2005, and was buried in the Bosque da Paz Cemetery. She was succeeded by her eldest daughter Jocelina Barbosa Bispo ("Jojó").
