= Dirce Tutu Quadros =

Brazilian politician (1943–2014)

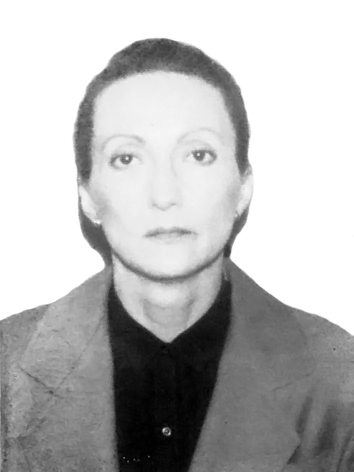

Federal Deputy from São Paulo
- In office 1 February 1987 – 1 February 1991

Personal details
- Born: 28 December 1943 São Paulo, Brazil
- Died: 28 August 2014 (aged 70) Los Angeles, California, United States
- Profession: Politician

Dirce Maria do Valle Quadros (28 December 1943 — 28 August 2014), better known as Dirce Tutu Quadros, was a Brazilian politician.

Quadros was the only child of the former president Jânio Quadros and Eloá do Valle Quadros. She got married at the age of sixteen to journalist Alaor José Gomes, who worked in the office of their father, then governor, and the couple had three daughters. Later, after separating, she remarried and moved to the United States, having a son named John Jânio.

== Political career ==
In 1986, Quadros ran for constituent federal deputy, but she had problems with her candidacy, which forced her to join the Social Christian Party after her membership records disappeared. After her election in 1986, shortly before her inauguration, she left the PSC and joined the PTB (Brazilian Labor Party) and served until 1991.

In 1987, she spoke in the Chamber of Deputies, defending parliamentarism and the popular vote for the election of Presidents of the Republic and members of the National Congress. Quadros was against the 5-year term of José Sarney, and against presidentialism. After a period at the PTB, she inscribed her name as one of the founders of the Brazilian Social Democracy Party (PSDB) in 1988. In the second half of that same year, Leonel Júlio asked for the annulment of Tutu Quadros' mandate, saying that because she was an American naturalized, she could not continue in the Brazilian parliament. The case was filed by José Fernando Eichenberg, at the time, acting justice minister.

Leaving the PSDB, she ran for re-election by the PMDB in 1990, without success. She then retired from politics and took up residence in the United States.
