= Eva Sopher =

Brazilian theatre manager

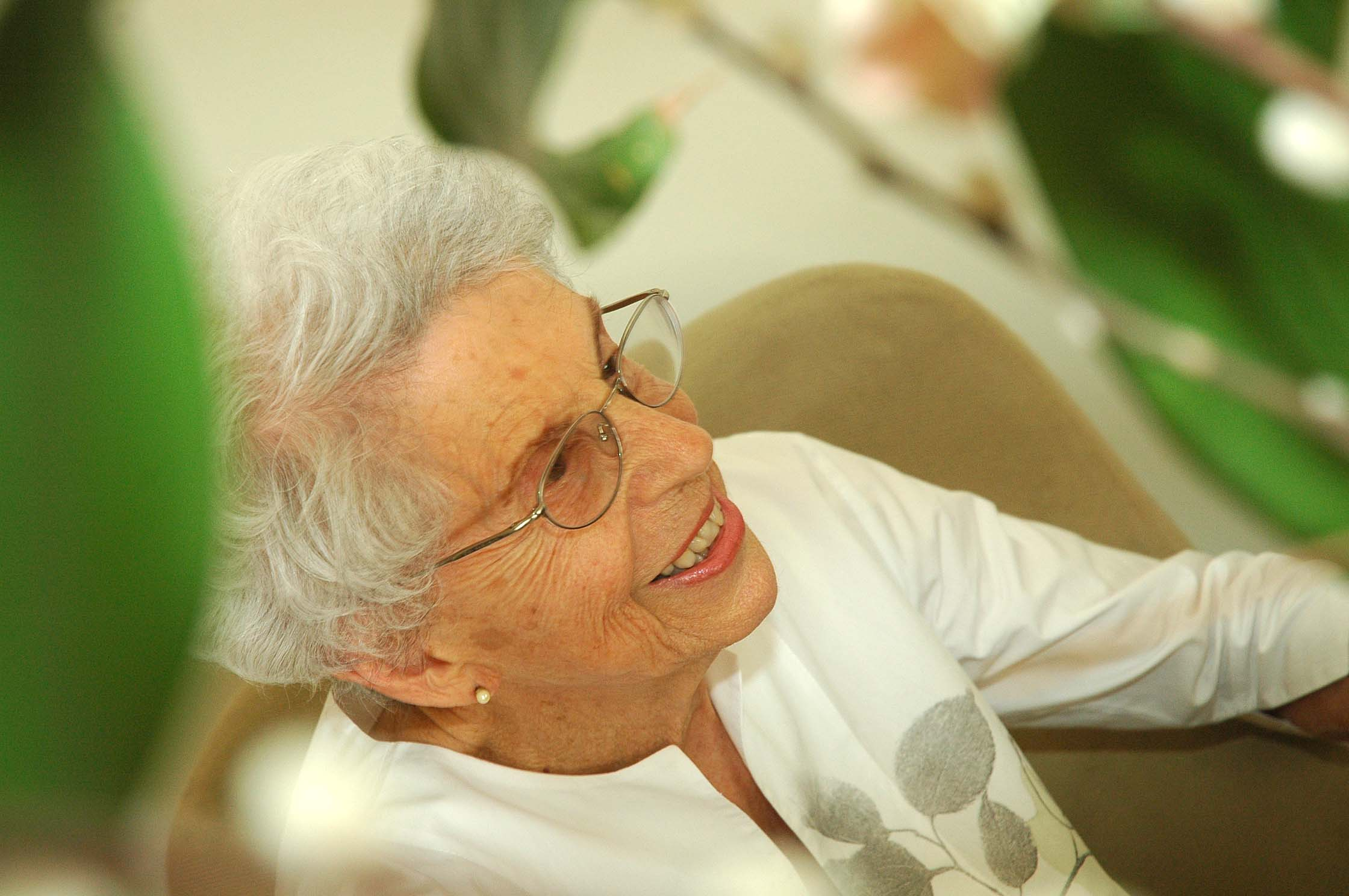
- "Dona Eva"
- Born: Eva Margarete Plaut; June 18, 1923; Frankfurt am Main
- Died: February 7, 2018 (aged 94); Porto Alegre
- Occupation: theatre manager
- Known for: renovating the São Pedro Theatre and ran it
- Spouse: Wolfgang Klaus Sopher
- Children: two daughters

Eva Sopher (June 18, 1923 – February 7, 2018) was a Brazilian theatre manager in Porto Alegre. She renovated the São Pedro Theatre and ran it for 41 years.

== Life ==
Sopher was born in 1923 in Frankfurt am Main in Germany. She was born Eva Margarete Plaut; her parents Max and Marie were Jewish and, like many, her family left Germany to avoid the rise of Nazism in 1936. She was educated in São Paulo and when she was 16 she met Theodor Heuberger, who gave her work at his art gallery. Heuberger was the founder of the non-profit organization named Pro-Arte to create cultural events involving Brazil and Germany. Heuberger was supported by the composer Pedro Sinzig and the pianist Maria Amélia Rezende Martins.

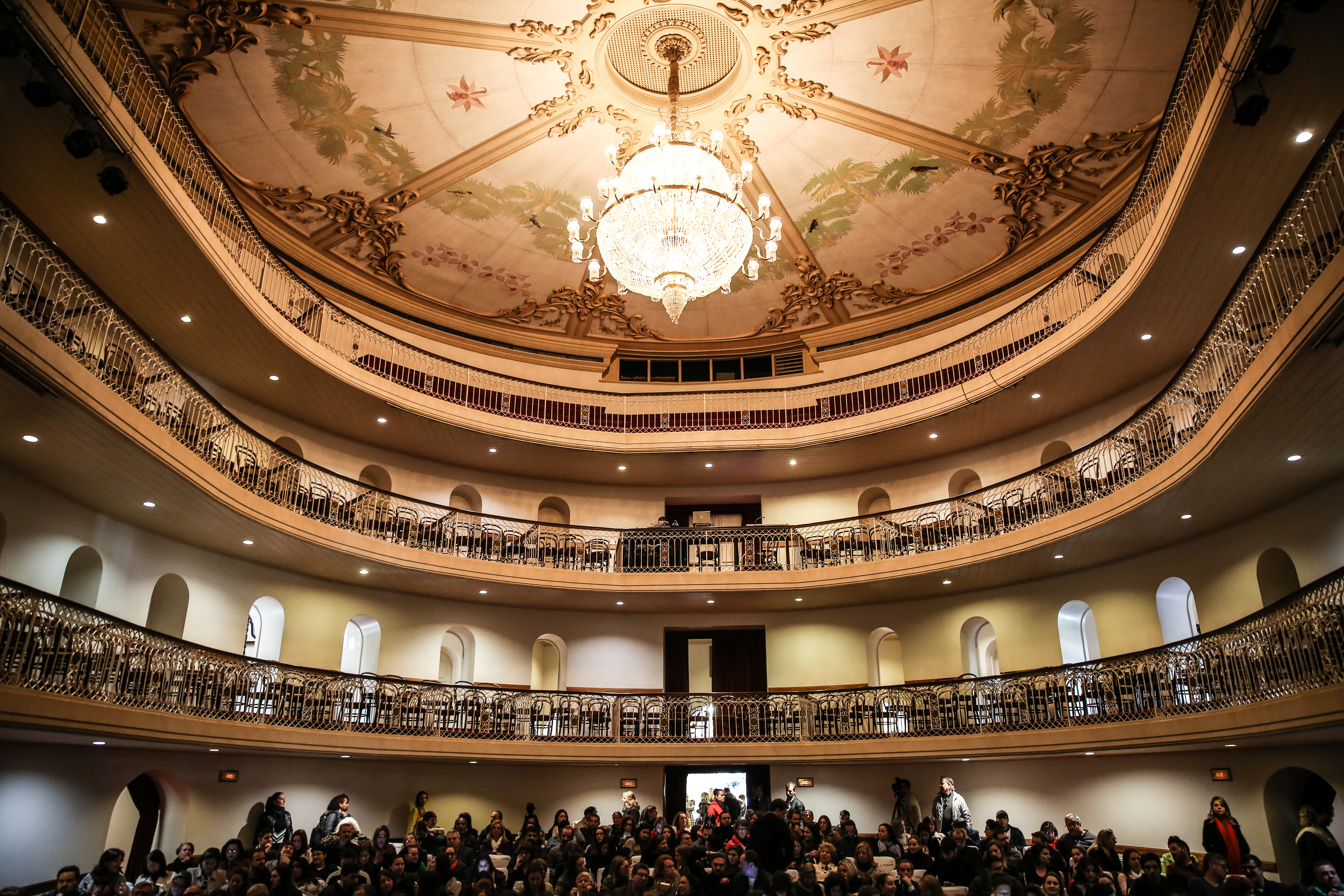
Theatro São Pedro in 2018

Sopher ran many artistic endeavours in Porto Alegre for the organisation Pro-Arte.

In the 1970s the São Pedro Theatre was in need of a major renovation. The theatre dated from 1858. Sopher was chosen by the government to lead the project. The renovation was to take nine years and the theatre became Sopher's life's work. The theatre reopened in 1984. To achieve this she had created the Theatro São Pedro Foundation in 1982 and she became its president.

The theatre quickly became an artistic, social, and political centre in the country. Sopher was to run the theatre for 41 years (the rest of her life). In 1991 there was a challenge to her leadership but admirers including the Brazilian director and actor Bete Coelho gathered to hold hands around the theatre to show their support.

In 2015 she was awarded the Goethe Medal to recognise her work in improving cultural exchange. The organisers noted how she and her theatre were the hosts to different cultures. Given her background they particularly noted that this list includes the culture of Germany.

Further extensions to the theatre's facilities had been started by Sopher with a budget of R$20m but as the work was started the estimated costs rose to R$50m. Although still not complete in 2018 the project had delivered a car park, rooms for administration, a new restaurant, and a music salon.

== Death and legacy ==
Sopher died in Porto Alegre in 2018. The mayor Nelson Marchezan Júnior and José Ivo Sartori, who was Governor of Rio Grande do Sul declared three days of mourning. Sopher left two daughters, four grandchildren and seven great-grandchildren.

An 18,000 square metre community complex at the São Pedro Theatre was named after Eva Sopher.
