= Ile Maroia Laji =

Ilê Maroiá Lájié
- Location of Ilê Maroiá Lájié in Brazil

Religion
- Affiliation: Candomblé
- Sect: Ketu
- Year consecrated: 1867

Location
- Municipality: Salvador
- State: Bahia
- Country: Brazil
- Interactive map of Ilê Maroiá Lájié
- Coordinates: 12.975712°S 38.490220°W

National Historic Heritage of Brazil
- Designated: 2001
- Reference no.: 1481

Ile Maroia Laji is one of the oldest Candomblé temples in Salvador, Brazil, in the neighborhood of Matatu de Brotas. It was designated a National Heritage Site in 2005. The temple was influential in the promotion of Candomblé and in distancing the religion from Catholicism under the leadership of High Priestess Olga de Alaketu in the late 20th and early 21st centuries.

== History ==
The oral tradition maintained by the temple claims that the temple was founded in 1636 by a princess brought from the Yoruba Kingdom of Ketu, in present-day Republic of Benin. Otherwise the historical account tells us that surrounding areas of the Royal City of Ketu was raided by Dahomean army only in 1789, when possibly they captured some royals who were sold to slave-traders. Ile Maroia Laji's tradition corroborates this account, providing a succession of seven leaders to the temple since its foundation that hardly couldn't cover the claimed 350 years of its existence.

The temple's account tells that nine years old twin sisters princesses captured in Ketu by Dahomean army and were sold to slave-traders and sent to Salvador, Bahia. The twins belonged to the Aro or Ọja Aro Clan, and their namer were Otampe Oja-Aro (or Ojaro) and Gogorixá. They were miraculously freed when they just arrived in Salvador. Whenceforth they worked for nine years as food sellers and maidservants in order to buy a ticket to get back to their homeland. Otampe Ojaro, initiated to the orisha Oxumarê (the serpent-rainbow), back in Dahomey, married a cousin called Alaji, and gave birth to a daughter called Akobi-Odé. The family went to Salvador and achieved a farm in the neighborhood of Matatu de Brotas, where they made a shrine to orisha Oxossi, the family's mythical ancestor. And named the shrine Ilé Ọmọ-Aro Alají (House of Alaji, son of Aro[Clan]), abbreviated as Ile Moroialaji or Maroialaji and nowadays recorded as Ile Maroia Laji. The shrine became a temple where Otampe Ojaro was the high-priestess.

The couple adopted Brazilian Portuguese names: Otampe Ojaro became Maria do Rosário Régis, Alaji was Porfírio Régis and Akobi-Odé was Maria Francisca Régis, their chosen family name, Régis, meaning "regal", "from the kings". After Otampe Ojaro death the leadership passed to her daughter Akobi-Odé/Maria Francisca Régis. The later's last will is the oldest document preserved in the temple examined by the anthropologist Vivaldo da Costa Lima, and dates from 1867. Akobi-Odé left the high-priesthood to her grandson, José Gonçalo Régis (Babá Aboré), initiated to the orisha Oshala. José's niece, Dionísia Francisca Régis (Obá Oindá), initiated to orisha Xangô, succeeded him in the late 19th century.

After a long period in the leadership, Mother Dionísia died in 1948, and left her grand-niece, Olga Francisca Régis (Oiá-funmi), a 23 years old young woman initiated to the orisha Oya-Iansan, in the leadership of the temple. So then the temple, also known as Terreiro do Alaketu, reminding the leading family origins, gain national and international-wide notoriety, and the new high priestess, nicknamed Olga de Alaketu, became an important figure in the Candomblé, ruling over her temple and respective community with her strong personality over 57 years, dying victimized by diabetes on 28 September 2005 just after the old temple's official recognition as National (Brazilian) Heritage by the Ministry of Culture. Mother Olga's successor is her eldest daughter, Jocelina Barbosa Bispo, Mother Jojó, initiated to Nanã Buruku.
