= Jurema Werneck =

Brazilian feminist and activist, lead for Amnesty international in Brazil

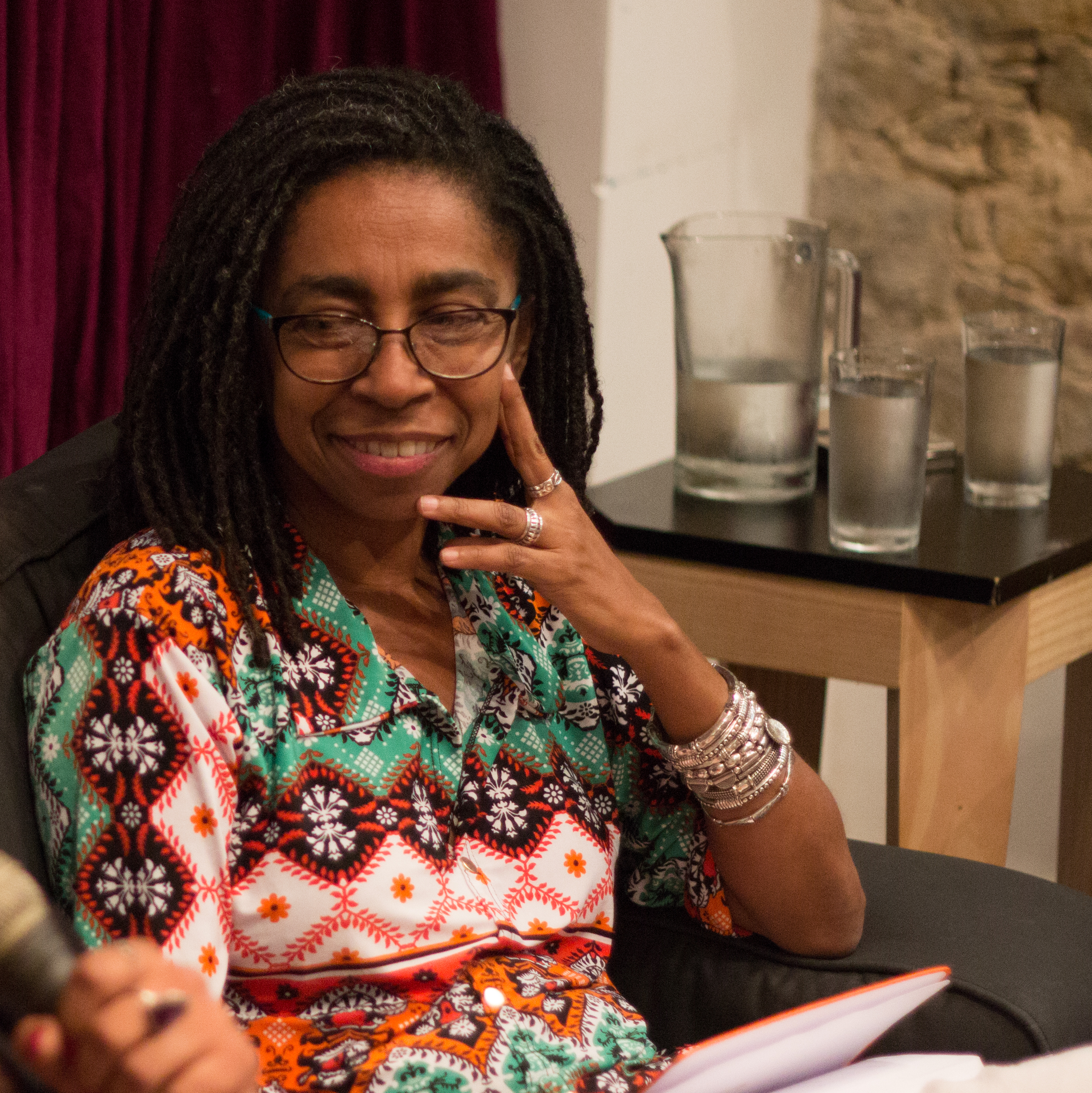
- by Safira Moreira in 2018
- Born: Jurema Werneck; Morro dos Cabritos, Rio de Janeiro
- Education: Universidade Federal Fluminense
- Occupation: Physician

Jurema Pinto Werneck is the Brazilian director for Amnesty International in Brazil. She is a black feminist, physician, author, and doctor in Communication and Culture from the Federal University of Rio de Janeiro. She is also a board member of the Global Fund for Women. Her works include, "Estelizacao de mulheres um desafio para a bioetica?", "Saúde da população negra", "O Livro Da Saude Das Mulheres Negras", and "Black Women's Health: Our Steps Come Away".

== Life ==
Werneck was born in the poor area known as Morro dos Cabritos in Rio de Janeiro. After high school, Jurema attended medicine at Fluminense Federal University as the only black student on the course, this being the case for several years.

After graduating, she worked at the Rio de Janeiro Municipal Secretariat for Social Assistance and the Center for Articulation of Marginalized Populations.

In 1992, she was one of the founders of the NGO "Criola" which promotes black women's rights.

An activist for the Brazilian black women and human rights movement, she published the book "Black Women's Health: Our Steps Come Away" in 2006.

Werneck became the Executive Director of Amnesty International Brazil in February 2017. Amnesty has had an office in Brazil since 2012. Werneck is a board member of the Global Fund for Women and the United Nations Population Fund.

== Selected works ==
- "Estelizacao de mulheres um desafio para a bioetica?", 1995
- "Saúde da população negra", 2012
- "O Livro Da Saude Das Mulheres Negras"
- "Black Women's Health: Our Steps Come Away", 2006
