= Madre de Deus, Bahia =

Municipality of Bahia, Brazil

Municipality of Madre de Deus Madre de Deus
- Municipality
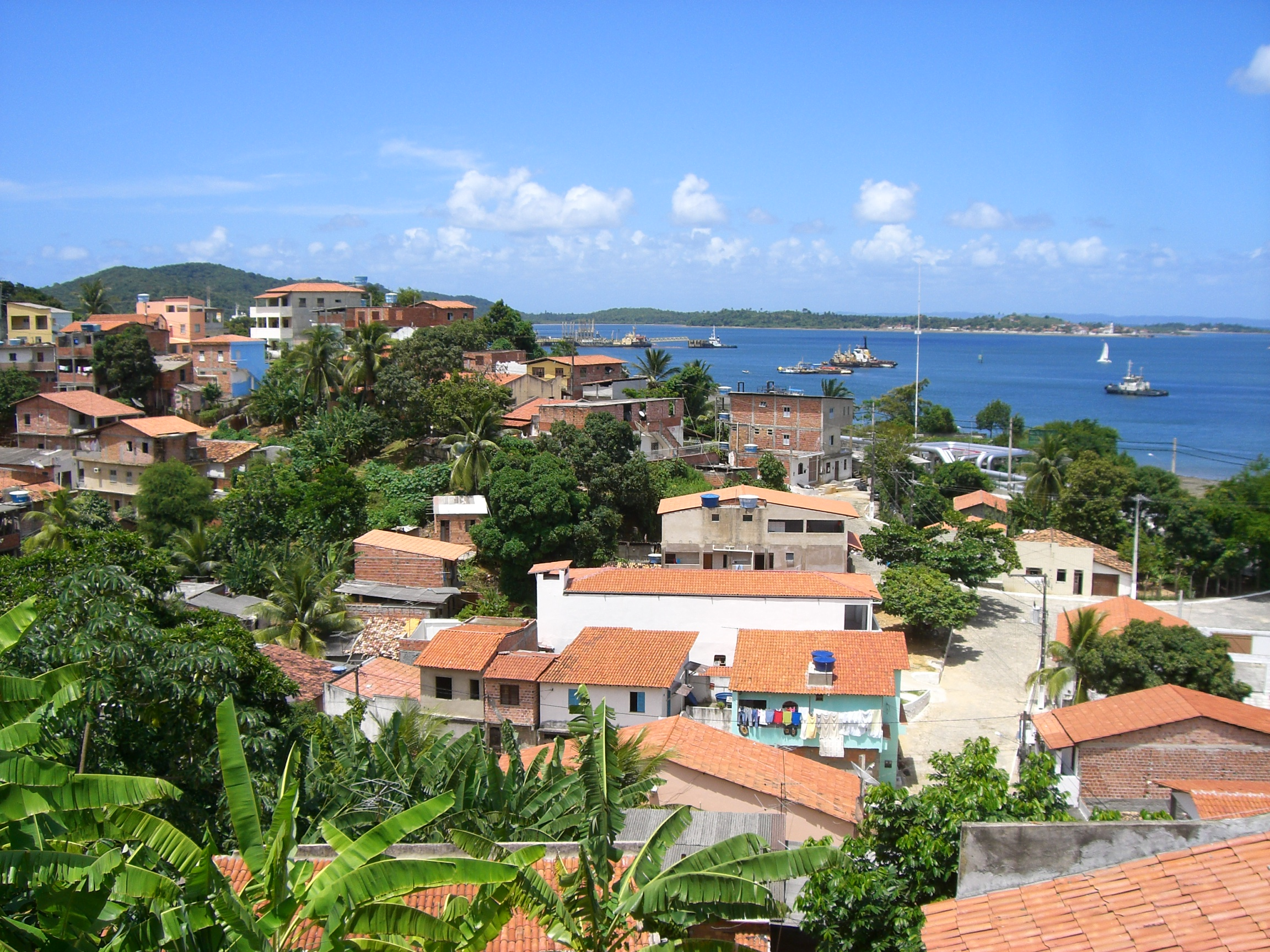
- Sight at a Church in Madre de Deus.

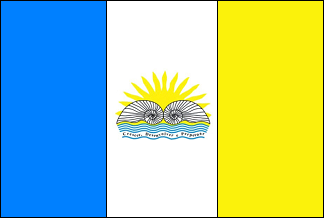
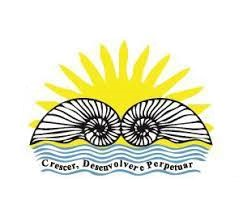
- Flag Coat of arms

- Location of Madre de Deus in Bahia and Brazil
- Coordinates: 12°44′27″S 38°37′15″W
- Country: Brazil
- Region: Nordeste
- State: Bahia
- Founded: 1990

Government
  - Mayor: Jeferson Andrade Batista (PR)

Area
  - Total: 4.302 sq mi (11.141 km^{2})

Population (2020)
  - Total: 21,432
- Time zone: UTC−3 (BRT)
- HDI (2000): 0.740 – medium
- Website: Official website

Madre de Deus is a municipality in the state of Bahia in the North-East region of Brazil. The municipality is located on a small archipelago in the Bay of All Saints; it both the smallest municipality by land mass in Bahia and the Northeastern region of Brazil. Madre de Deus is spread across two islands, the Ilha de Madre de Deus and the much smaller Ilha de Maria Guarda. It sits in close proximity to two others islands, the Ilha do Bom Jesus dos Passos and Ilha dos Frades, both part of the city of Salvador. The Ilha de Madre de Deus is further subdivided into the neighborhoods of Centro, Suape, Cação, Marezinha, Mirim, Alto do Paraíso, Apicum, Nova Madre de Deus e Quitéria, Alto da Matriz, Alto do Santo Antônio, Alto da Boa Vista, Cururupeba, Malvinas, and Nova Brasília.

Carnival in Madre de Deus is noted for costumes called caretas.

== History ==
Madre de Deus was originally settled by Tupinambá people. The Portuguese established a settlement called Madre de Deus do Boqueirão on the island in 1696; the name was shortened to Madre de Deus in 1938. It remained part of the city of Salvador until 1990. Its economy centers on the Petrobras maritime terminal; artisanal fishing and tourism are secondary industries. Madre de Deus has suffered ecological degradation due to the petroleum industry. Major oil spills occurred in the municipality in 1992 and 1999.

== Access ==
Madre de Deus is connected to the mainland via the municipalities of Candeias and São Francisco do Conde. The municipality is located only 100 metres (330 ft) from the mainland, and can be crossed by foot at low tide. A bridge was connected to Madre de Deus in 1950 with the establishment of the Petrobras TEMADRE maritime terminal.

== See also ==
- List of municipalities in Bahia
