= Candeias, Bahia =

Municipality of Bahia State, Brazil

Candeias
- Municipality of Bahia, Brazil
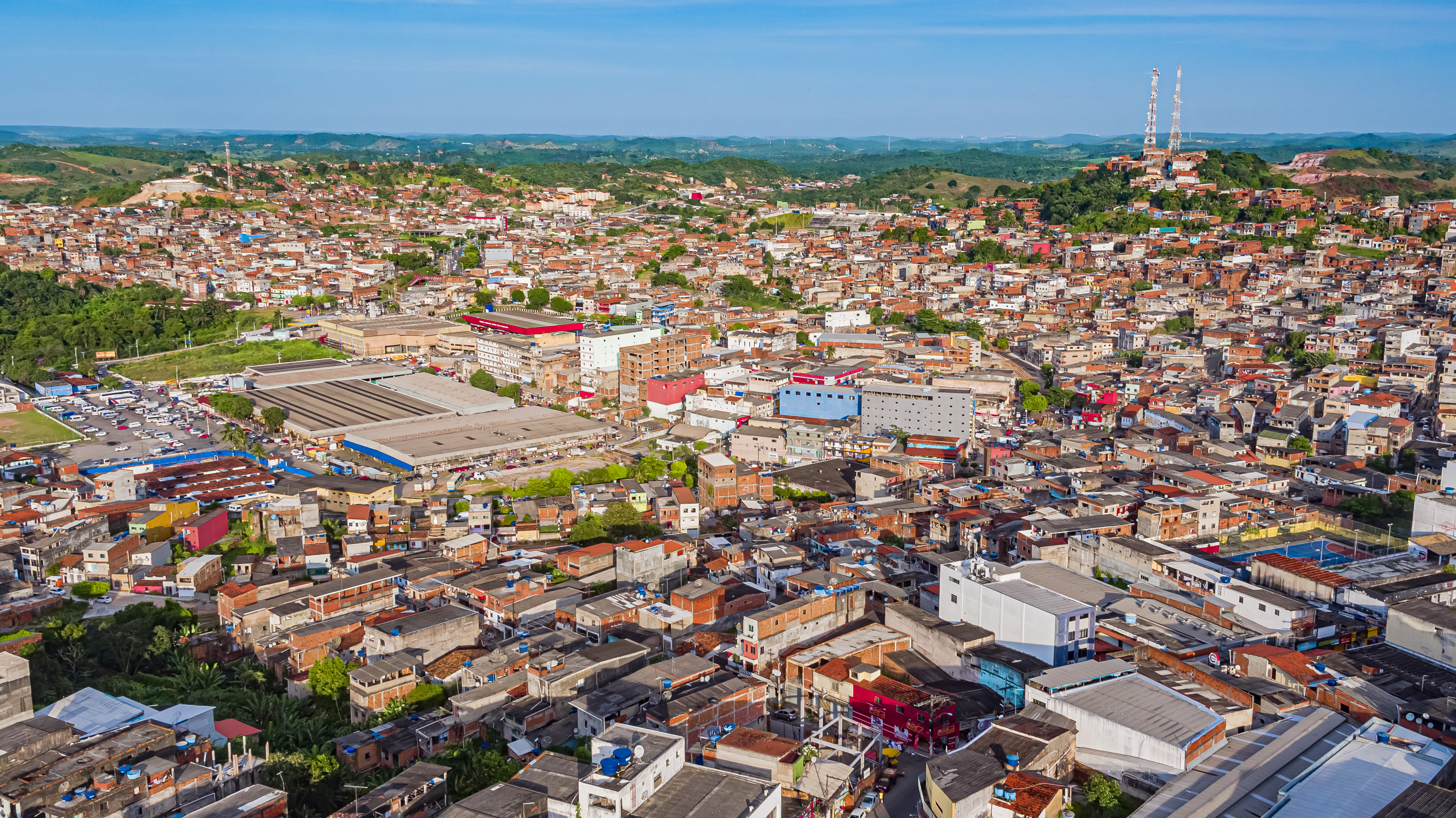
- Aerial view of Candeias

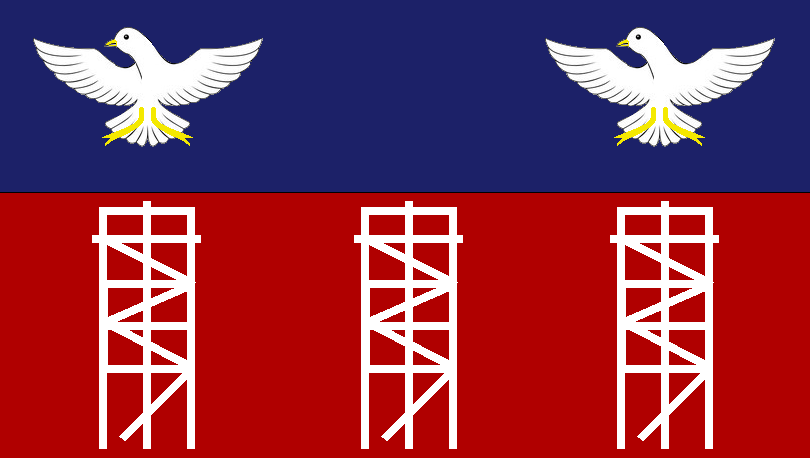
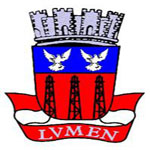
- Flag Coat of arms
- Etymology: In English "Candles", symbolizing light
- Motto: Latin: Lumen; English: Light
- Location of Candeias in Bahia

- Location within Brazil Location within South America
- Coordinates: 12°40′04″S 38°33′03″W
- Country: Brazil
- Region: Northeast
- State: Bahia
- Founded: 14 August 1958

Government
  - Mayor: Eriton dos Santos Ramos (PP) (2025-2028)
  - Vice Mayor: Washington Paraguaçu do Nascimento Silva (PRD) (2025-2028)

Area
  - Total: 251.808 km^{2} (97.224 sq mi)
- Elevation: 97 m (318 ft)

Population (2022)
  - Total: 72,382
  - Density: 287.45/km^{2} (744.5/sq mi)
- Demonym: Candeense (Brazilian Portuguese)
- Time zone: UTC-03:00 (Brasília Time)
- Postal code: 43840-000, 43841-000, 43843-000, 43844-000, 43845-000, 43846-000
- HDI (2010): 0.691 – medium
- Website: prefeitura.candeias.ba.gov.br

Candeias is a municipality in Brazil, in the state of Bahia. It is located 46 kilometres (29 mi) to the north of Salvador, the capital of Bahia. The town is near the BR-324 motorway. The town has a current population of 87,458 (2020 estimate).

With the 6th-highest GDP in Bahia, its major economics activities are the port of Aratu which is one of the most important of the country. The town is based next to the second-biggest oil refinery of the country, Landulfo Alves refinery.

Its GDP is R$ 1,698,526,384 (US$ 1,081,863,939) and its HDI is 0.719.

== Historic heritage sites ==
Candeias is home to four historic heritage sites, protected at either the federal or state level:

- Freguesia Plantation (Portuguese: Engenho da Freguesia), which now functions as the Wanderley Pinho Museum of the Recôncavo
- Matoim Plantation (Portuguese: Engenho Matoim)
- Church of Our Lady of the Incarnation of Passé (Portuguese: Igreja da Nossa Senhora da Encarnação de Passé)
- Candeias Oil Well (C-1) (Portuguese: Poço de Petróleo de Candeias (C-1))
- Wanderley Pinho Museum (Portuguese: Museu Wanderley Pinho)

In the heart of the Recôncavo Baiano, the Wanderley Pinho Museum is home to a collection of over 200 artifacts dating back to the 17th century, including clothing, artwork, ceramics, and furniture. Recently restored by the Government of Bahia, the museum's restoration project also encompassed the chapel and sugar mill, adding to the authenticity of the site.

While not under federal or state protection, the following sites are recognized by the Calouste Gulbenkian Foundation as part of the Património de Influência Portuguesa.

- Chapel of Saint Antony of Pindobas (Portuguese: Capela de Santo António de Pindobas)
- House of the São João Sugar Mill (Portuguese: Casa do Engenho São João)

== See also ==
- List of municipalities in Bahia
