= Omiero =

In the Cuban religion of Santería, omiero, also known as purificacíon de santo, is a liquid used in various ritual acts.

== Uses ==
The term omiero derives from the Lucumi language which is used for ritual purposes in Santería. This liquid is also known by the Spanish language term purificacíon de santo. It primarily consists of a mix of herbs and water.

The otanes, which are stones deemed to be the physical representation of the oricha, are "fed" by pouring both omiero and the blood of sacrificed animals onto them. Practitioners believe that through this, the oricha consume the aché, a type of spiritual energy, from these liquids. Both omiero and animal blood are also poured onto the cowry shells which are used for the dilogún form of divination, again to "feed" them. Omiero is again used to wash the drums employed during ritual drumming sessions as part of the ritual to consecrate them.

Omiero is also used during initiation ceremonies for the purpose of purifying the initiate. In Santería initiation ceremonies, the iyawó (initiate) ingests omiero on each of the seven days of initiation.
