= Initiation in Santería =

Religion

In the Caribbean religion of Santería, individuals are required to go through an initiation process to become a full practitioner, known as a santero (male) or santera (female).

== Terminology and costs ==
Being initiated is known as kariocha, "making ocha", or "making santo". A charge is usually levied for initiation; this varies depending on the status of the practitioner and the wealth of the client but is typically seen as expensive. In Cuba, it is often the equivalent of a year's wage, or more. In the 1990s, an initiation in Cuba cost roughly US$500 for Cuban nationals and between US$2,000–3,000 for foreigners. In the United States, an initiation was reported as costing as much as $10,000 in 1989, and between $15,000 and $20,000 in 2001, again being close to the average annual wage. This is in keeping with the broader place of financial exchange within the religion; Hagedorn noted that "everything in Santería costs money".

Santería initiation ceremonies derive from those in Yoruba traditional religion but is almost always carried out for adults, whereas among the Yoruba, initiation can also involve children. Each initiation varies in its details, although practitioners often try to ensure a veil of secrecy around the process, ensuring that the precise details are not discovered by non-initiates. The initiate is known as an iyabó or iyawó, a term meaning both "slave of the orisha" and "bride of the orisha". As well as the santero or santera overseeing the initiation ceremony, the event may be attended by an oyubona ("one who witnesses"), who acts as a secondary godparent to the new initiate.

== Stages of initiation ==
The process of initiation takes place over seven days, with an additional two days of preparatory rituals. Before the main seven-day ceremony, usually two days before, a misa espiritual will often take place to gain the blessings of the ancestral egun. During this ritual, it is common for the egun to be invited to possess the initiate. One day before the main events, an ebó de entrada ("opening sacrifice") often takes place, with sacrifices being made to either the oricha or the egun. Next comes the ceremonia del río (ceremony of the initiate), which involves the oyubona and the initiate. It entails honey and the ochinchín omelette being offered to the oricha Ochún, with the oyubona then engaging in divination to determine if Ochún has accepted the sacrifice. In the rompimiento (breaking), the oyubona then takes the initiate to a river. There, the initiate has their clothing ripped off of them before they are washed in the river water, used both as a purification and to gain Ochún's blessing.

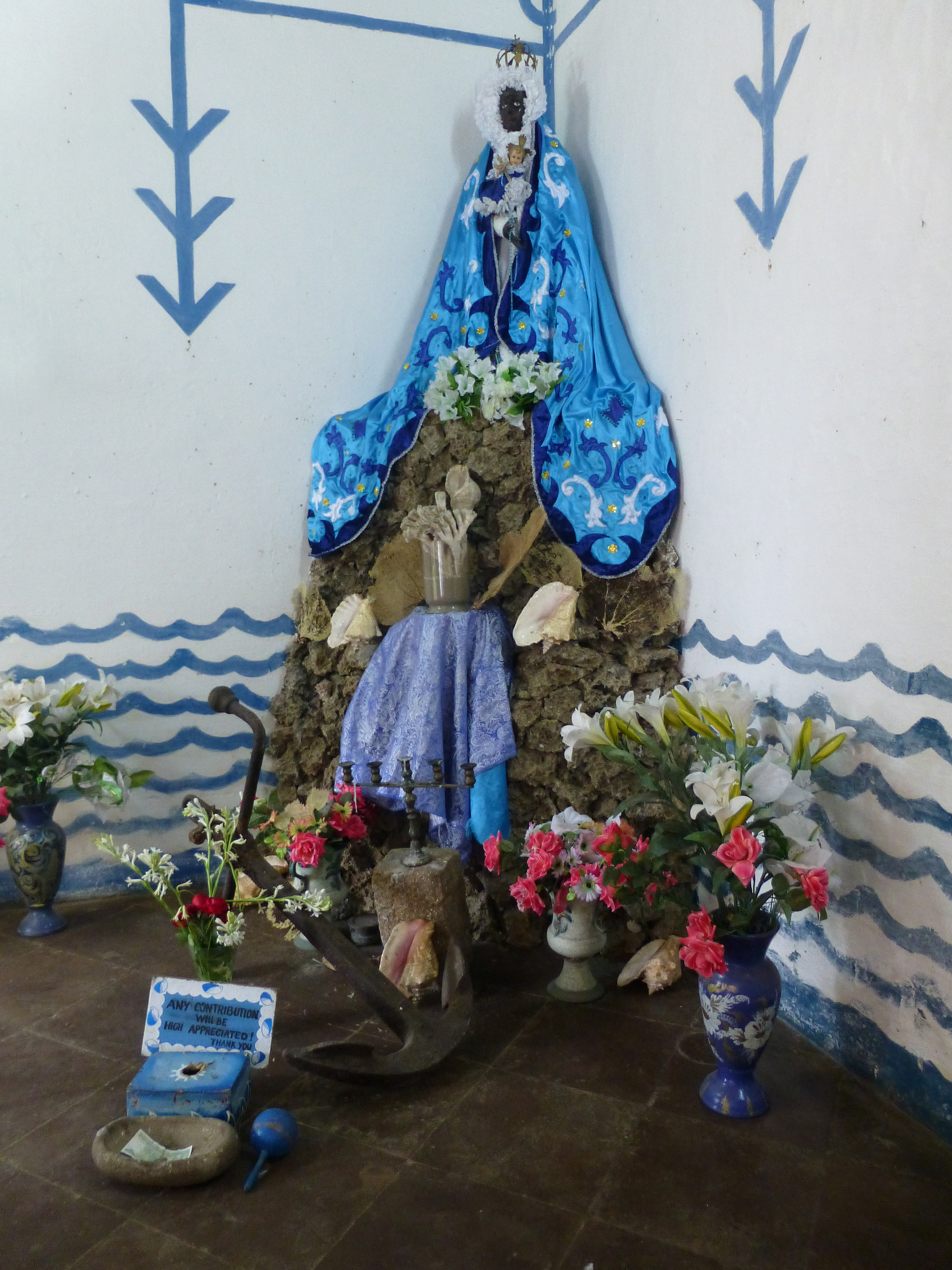
A Santería shrine in Trinidad, Cuba

The rest of the initiation takes place in the igbodu, or inner sanctum of the casa. The igbodu would have been ritually cleansed for the ceremony, having palm fronds hung from the door frame to deter bad influences and a white sheet stretched across the threshold. For the rest of the seven days, the initiate is expected to remain here, sleeping upon a mat on the floor. No one who is not directly involved in the initiation ceremonies is permitted entry. During the prendición (pinning) ritual, a heavy necklace known as the collar de mazo is placed on the initiate. Also taking place here is the lavatorio ("washing"); the santero/santera overseeing the procedure washes the initiate in omiero, a type of sacred water that has been infused with various herbs. This is done to rid the initiate of malevolent or harmful spirits of the dead which might have attached themselves. The initiate's head usually receives most attention in this washing; often, their hair will be shaved off. This cleansing of the head is known as the rogación de cabeza.

The new initiate is given beaded necklaces, known as elekes, ilekes, or collares. Historically, many casas maintained that only women should be involved in making the elekes, although this is not universally observed. The necklace will be consecrated using a mix of herbal waters and the blood of sacrificed animals and after that it will be placed around the initiate' neck, at which they will again have their head bathed. Initiates often receive the necklaces of the five most powerful and popular oricha. Each of these necklaces is given a different color associated with a specific deity; those associated with Eleguá are for instance often black and red. As a santero/santera undergoes further initiations within the Santería system, they receive additional collares. Along with the collares, the religion also features colored bracelets known as idés. The wearing of beaded jewellery is seen as keeping the protective power of the oricha close to the practitioner's body. The elekes serve as the sacred banners for the oricha and act as a sign of their presence and protection; however, it must never be worn during a woman's menstruation period, nor during sex, nor when bathing.

As well as the necklaces, the initiate will also receive their own sacred stones. An additional ritual, known as "receiving the warriors", is a ritual where the initiated receives objects from their padrino that represents the warriors: iron tools to represent Ogún; an iron bow and arrow to represent Ochosi; and an iron or silver chalice surmounted by a rooster to represent Osún. At some point during the week, and usually on the third day, the initiate will undergo the itá, a session with a diviner in which the latter will inform them about their strengths, weaknesses, and taboos that they should observe. This is known as the día del itá ("day of history"). At this point, the initiate's Lucumí ritual name will be revealed by the diviner; this is a praise name of the oricha which rules their head. It will often incorporate elements which indicate the initiate's tutelary oricha; devotees of Yemajá for instance usually include omí ("water") in their name, while those of Changó often have obá ("king"). The diviner's predictions are transcribed in a book, la libreta de itá, which the initiate is expected to keep for the rest of their life. This day also involves the nangareo, an offering of food to Olorun the creator deity.

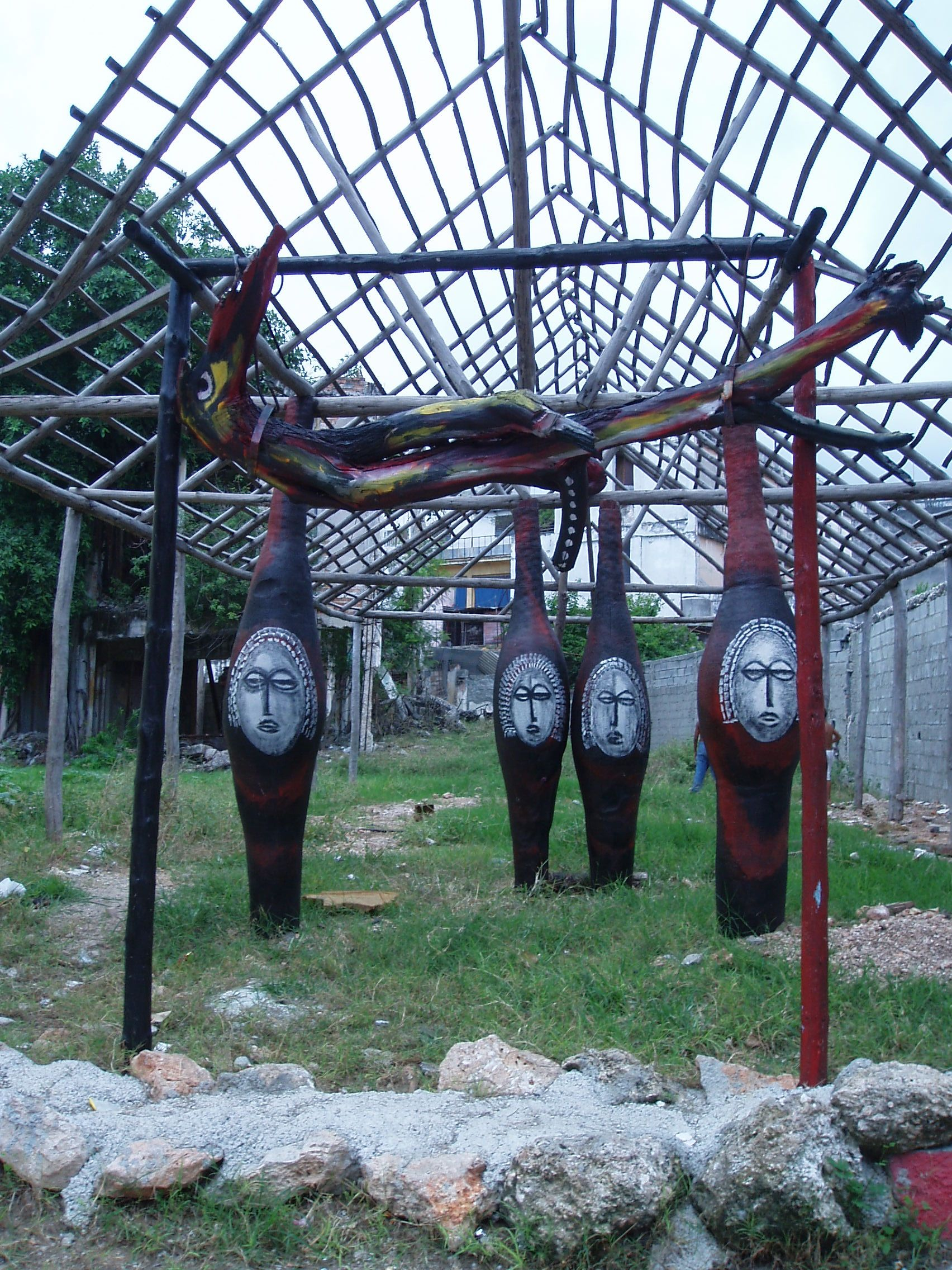
A cult space for Santería ceremonies in Havana

This next ritual is known as the asiento (seating), or the coronación (coronation), and it is believed that it marks the point when the aché of the tutelary oricha which "rules their head" is literally placed inside the initiate's cranium. The otánes of various oricha are placed to the head of the initiate, culminating in those of their own tutelary oricha. Sometimes, the initiate then feels that they are being possessed by the latter oricha at this point. Some practitioners will make a cruciform incision into the crown of the initiate's head to better facilitate the oricha's penetration; in some cases, small incisions will also have been made on the initiate's tongue to ensure that the oricha will descend into them with the "gift of speech". After this point, practitioners believe that the oricha literally lives within the initiate's head, forming a binding relationship between the two.

A matanza animal sacrifice usually follows, designed to feed all of the major oricha. At least five four-legged animals are usually killed at this point, often accompanied by 25 birds. The initiator may wipe a live chicken over the body of the initiate before killing it. A series of additional birds may then be brought out and killed in the same manner, their carcasses placed next to images of the oricha. The initiate then performs the moforiba by lying on the ground as a sign of respect to the oricha that they have received. Then they rise and are welcomed by their godparent, reflecting that they are now part of their casa. At this point, their relationship becomes that of a godfather/mother to a godson/daughter.

The following day is el Día del Medio ("the middle day") and is one of public celebration at the initiation. The initiate is dressed in clothing of the colors associated with their tutelary oricha; this clothing will only ever be worn again when the initiate is buried. They then sit on a throne adjacent to the tureens containing the otánes of their oricha. Guests, who may include the initiate's family and friends, visit them to pay homage. A drumming ceremony takes place, after which the assembled individuals feast on meat from animals killed the day before; it is believed this food is full of aché. On the seventh day of the initiation, which is usually a market or church day in Cuba, the new initiate leaves the casa, dressed in white and with their head covered. The oyugboda takes them to the marketplace, or (if outside Cuba) sometimes to a store run by a sympathizer. There, the oyugboda makes small offerings of food to Eleguá in the four corners of the market. The new initiate is expected to steal something small, which will also be an offering to Eleguá. The duo should then proceed to a Roman Catholic church, where they will light a candle for the new initiate.

== Post-initiation ==
The new initiate can finally take their tureen containing their otanes back to their home. They may then undergo a year-long period known as the iyaworaje ("journey of the iyawo") during which they are expected to observe various restrictions. The nature of these restrictions depends on the initiate's tutelary oricha. For instance, Hagedorn related that after her initiation into a Cuban casa, her initiator required her to sleep and eat on the floor for three months, abstain from sexual intercourse for 16 days, and both wear only white and not cut her hair for a year. These actions help to display the initiate's commitment to the religion and demarcate them from non-initiates. At the end of the year, the initiate conducts a ceremony known as ebó del año. It is only once this is done that they are allowed to lead many rituals and to be involved in the initiation of new converts.

The annual celebration of one's initiation into the religion is known as the cumpleaños de santo ("birthday in the saint"). As an initiate becomes more deeply involved in the religion, they learn about each of the different deities and make offerings to each of them in exchange for spiritual blessings and aché. They are expected to familiarise themselves with various herbs and their different associations and uses. Santeros and santeras often emphasise this teaching in a non-verbal manner, encouraging their initiate to learn through taking part in the ritual activities. As they gain more knowledge, the initiate is referred to as a serio ("serious"), indicating their greater commitment to the religion.
