= Chapa de costas =

Back push kick in capoeira

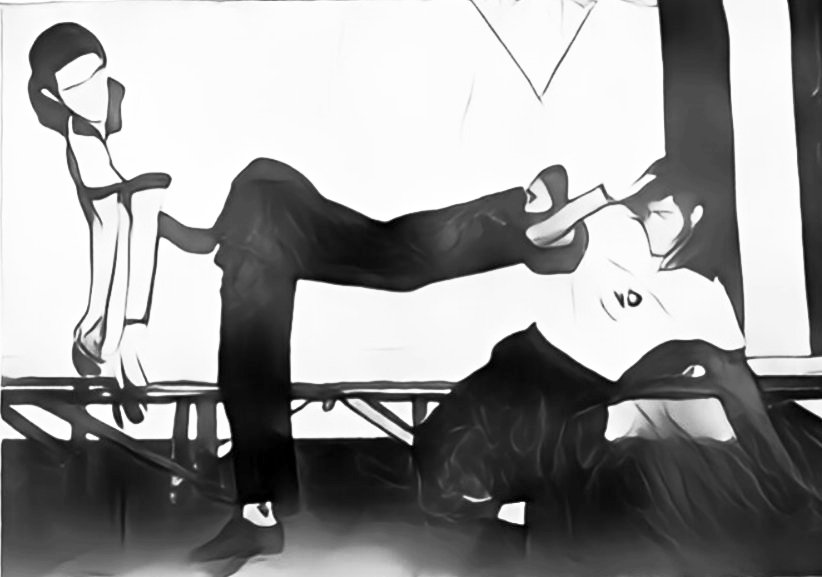
- Capoeira kick chapa de costas.
- Name: Chapa de costas
- Meaning: back plate
- Type: kick
- Parent style: capoeira Angola
- Parent technique: engolo back kick
- Child technique(s): mule kick double mule kick
- Escapes: resistençia
- Counters: rasteira

Chapa de costas (back plate) is a back push kick in capoeira, and one of the few principal capoeira's kicks. It is also basic kick in African martial art engolo, the forerunner of capoeira.

Chapa de costas is typical kick of capoeira Angola. This "malicious" kick is similar to chapa de frente, applied from the back to the opponent.

== Origin ==
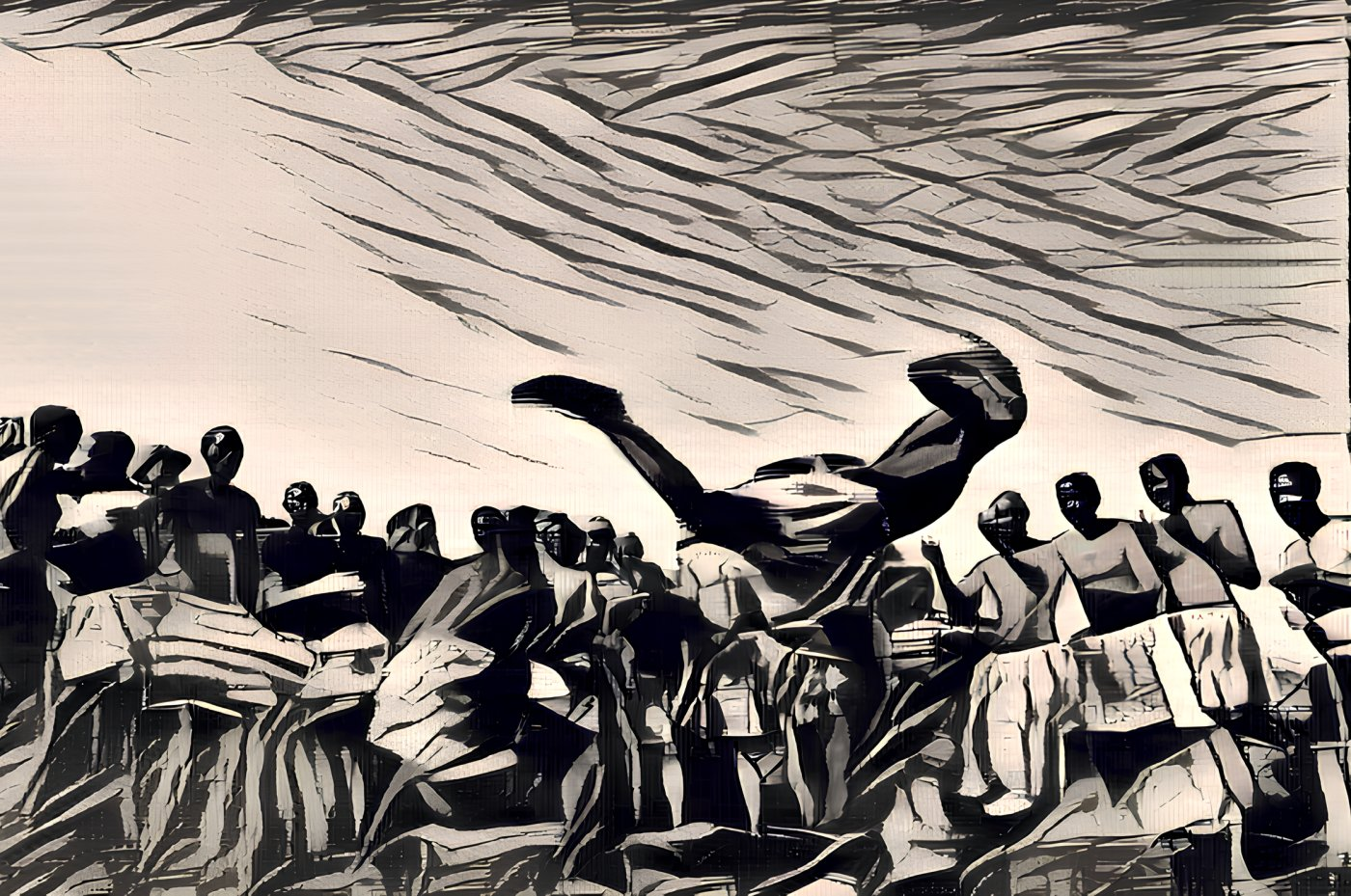
Zebra kick in ngolo

Various back push kicks are common in engolo, an Angolan martial art considered the ancestor of capoeira. Engolo players often do a rotation with a back push kick, with or without jumping. Another variation is a hooking kick executed from behind, resembling the capoeira kick gancho de costas. This particular kick is employed when the adversary's upper torso is in close proximity to one's own body.

Ngolo mimics the animal behavior, and the base techniques of engolo seems to be derived from the specific way of zebra fighting. A defining feature of engolo is the "zebra kick", back kick executed with the palms touching the ground.

== Technique ==
Chapa de costas usually aims at the opponent's face or groin area.

According to mestre Pastinha, chapa de costas is a "treacherous strike when used against someone unfamiliar with capoeira", as the opponent is violently struck when they believe the attacker is withdrawing. So Pastinha warns that a cautious capoeirista is "suspicious" and does not allow to be fooled by the apparent withdrawal of a potential aggressor.

== Variations ==
=== Mule kick (coice de mula) ===
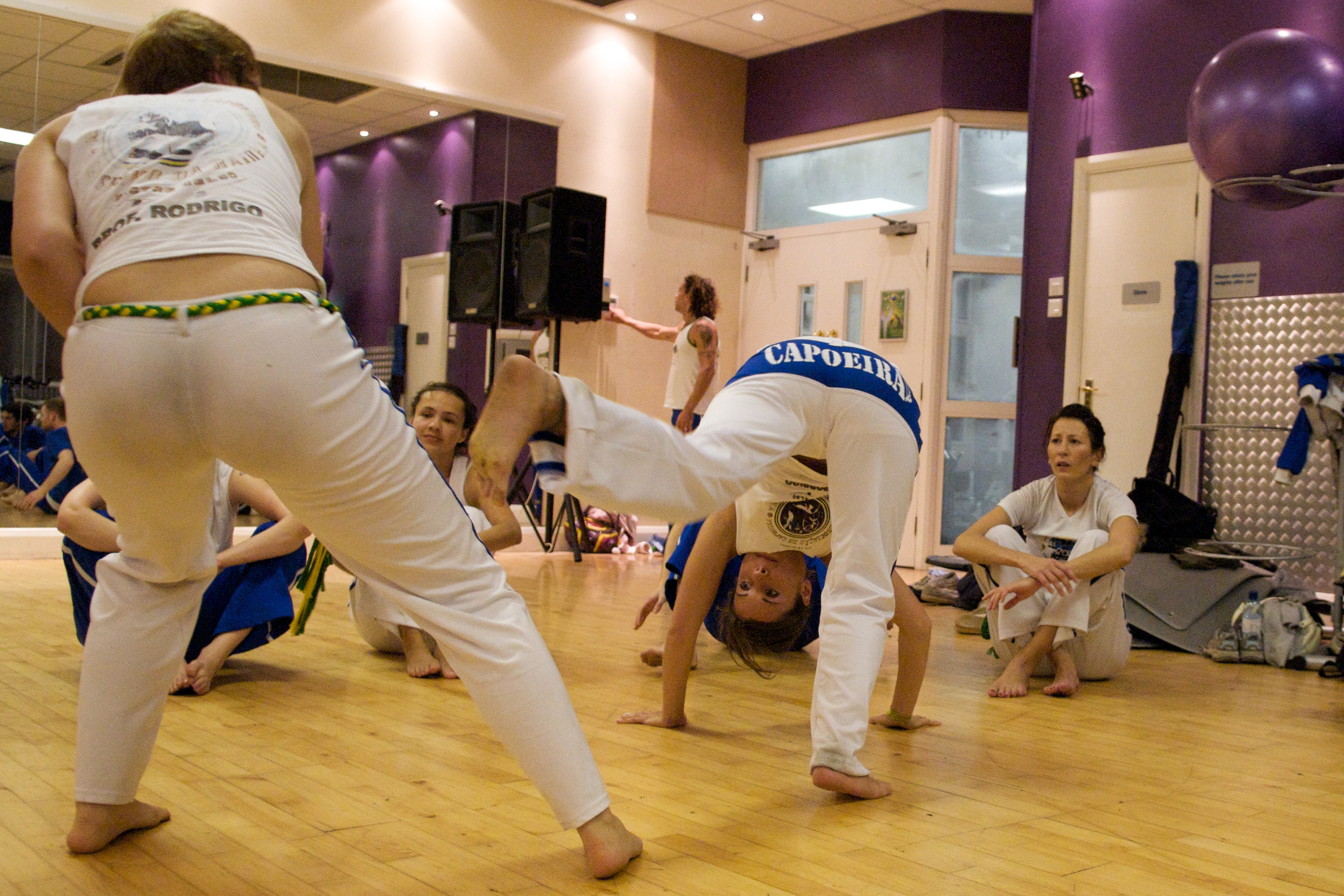
Chapa de costas with hands on ground, aka mule kick

There is a low variation of chapa de costas, performed with both hands on the ground while one of the legs is pushed towards the other player. In this variant, chapa de costas resembles a mule kick.

Mule kick is a direct kick delivered to the back, while looking through the arms to the opponent. This kick starts with a bent knee and then thrusts directly towards the target. The sole of the foot is the striking surface.

Low chapa de costas has the unique aspect of having a foundation of three limbs on the ground instead of one, which creates an exceptionally stable base for kicking.

To gain momentum, the mule kick may arise from negativa. After the spin, when the body balances on the feet and hands, one leg thrusts toward the opponent with the heel leading.

=== Double mule kick (coice duplo) ===
As the name suggests, coice duplo is a strike delivered with both feet to the chest or stomach. To execute a kick, the capoeirista, starting from a position facing the opponent, turns their body while supporting their hands on the ground, facing away from the opponent. Suddenly, by bending and lifting the legs, they launch both feet together toward the chosen target.

The double mule kick is a dangerous attack movement that can be used when escaping under armada, queixada, or meia-lua-de-compasso. To perform the double mule kick, the capoeirista should evade the attack and get near the attacker by doing a "half" rolê. Then, the capoeirista should forcefully kick the attacker under the chin with both feet.

== Defenses ==
Defense against the standing chapa de costas can be applied with a quick descent and the application of a takedown (rasteira).

== See also ==
- List of capoeira techniques

== Literature ==
- Da Costa, Lamartine Pereira (1961). Capoeiragem, a arte da defesa pessoal brasileira. Rio de Janeiro: Oficial da Marinha.
- Pastinha, Mestre (1988). Capoeira Angola. Fundação Cultural do Estado da Bahia.
- Capoeira, Nestor (2002). Capoeira: Roots of the Dance-Fight-Game. Blue Snake Books. ISBN 978-1-58394-637-4.
- Assunção, Matthias Röhrig (2002). Capoeira: The History of an Afro-Brazilian Martial Art. Routledge. ISBN 978-0-7146-8086-6.
- Capoeira, Nestor (2007). The Little Capoeira Book. Blue Snake Books. ISBN 9781583941980.
- Desch-Obi, M. Thomas J. (2008). Fighting for Honor: The History of African Martial Art Traditions in the Atlantic World. Columbia: University of South Carolina Press. ISBN 978-1-57003-718-4.
- Taylor, Gerard (2012). Capoeira 100: an Illustrated Guide to the Essential Movements and Techniques. Columbia: Blue Snake Books. ISBN 9781583941768.
