= Cartwheel kick =

Aú batido
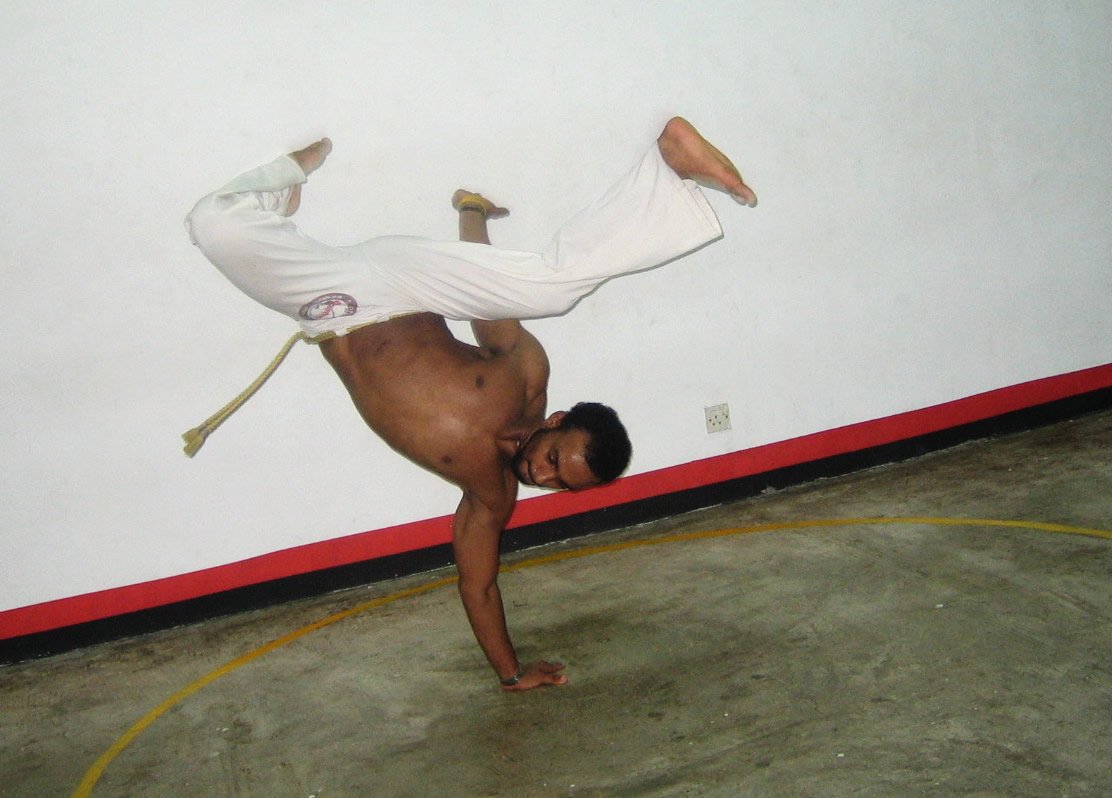
- The cartwheel kick (aú batido) in capoeira
- Name: Aú batido
- Meaning: cartwheel kick
- AKA: aú quebrado, aú malandro, beija flor, bico de papagaio, aú Amazonas
- Type: kick, floreio
- Parent style: capoeira Angola
- Parent technique: Aú
- Child technique(s): Aú batido fechado; Aú batido duplo; L-kick

Aú batido (cartwheel kick) is a traditional capoeira cartwheel kick, known under various names in breakdancing, MMA and other disciplines.

The cartwheel kick originated as a combat kick, but has become very popular as an acrobatic decoration (floreio). This is likely the most photographed capoeira move.

Like many other core techniques of capoeira, aú batido originates from engolo.

== Names ==
The Buntu name for this technique in engolo is okusana omaulo-ese (cartwheel or handstand kick down).

In capoeira, this kick has many names, including aú batido (cartwheel kick), aú quebrado (broken cartwheel), aú malandro, beija flor (hummingbird), bico de papagaio (parrot's beak) or aú Amazonas.

In breakdancing, a showcase version of the cartwheel kick is known as the L-kick.

== History ==
Engolo, an Angolan martial art considered as ancestor art of capoeira, using multiple cartwheel kicks, including aú batido, as part of its offensive repertoire. One of Neves e Sousa’s drawings clearly shows this technique.

Many inverted positions of engolo and capoeira, including the handstand, aú, rabo de arraia, and others, are believed to have originated from the use of handstand by Bantu shamans imitating their ancestors, who walked on their hands in the spirit world.

The aú batido was introduced successfully in mixed martial arts by Anthony Pettis, who has a capoeira background and showed the move against Shane Roller in WEC 50.

== Technique ==
One arm is used to support the body in the air while one leg performs a high kick directed at the opponent's head or torso.

The cartwheel kick is executed by throwing the body into a cartwheel motion, but rather than completing the wheel, the body flexes, while supported by one hand on the ground. One leg is brought downwards and forwards in a kicking motion, while the other remains in the air (giving rise to the name).

A common mistake when performing aú quebrado is trying to kick the leg sideways. Instead, the leg should kick forward and inward; otherwise, the joint where your thigh meets your hip will restrict the motion.

== Application ==
This movement can be used as both offensively and defensively, the latter usually when attempting to perform a cartwheel and the opponent attacks. The cartwheel kick can be also used for downward strikes against a low opponent. Finally, it can be used in the game as a floreio, to showcase physical dexterity and agility.

== Variations ==
There are many variants of this kick, including:

- double cartwheel kick (aú batido duplo), performed with both legs.
- closed cartwheel kick (aú batido fechado), where both legs are bent into a squat.
- L-kick, where both legs are straight, forming a right angle.

=== L-kick ===
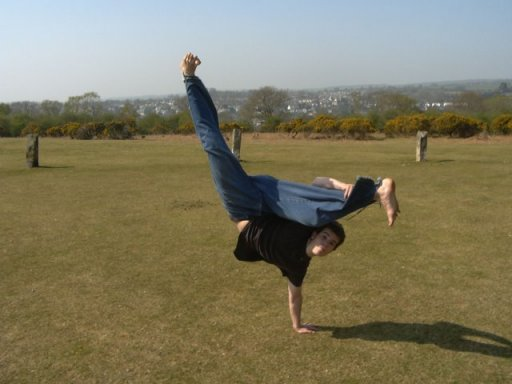
An L-kick.

In breakdancing, The L-kick is usually considered a freeze before returning to standing. Variations include a pike freeze, in which the non-kicking leg is bent dramatically towards the body so that the legs resemble a shotgun shape, an elbow L-kick where the kick is supported by the elbow and forearm placed on the ground rather than just a hand, and a capoeira switch where L-kicks are performed with first one leg then the other, in different directions and without landing the cartwheel motion.

== Literature ==
- Desch-Obi, M. Thomas J. (2008). Fighting for Honor: The History of African Martial Art Traditions in the Atlantic World. Columbia: University of South Carolina Press. ISBN 978-1-57003-718-4.
- Taylor, Gerard (2012). Capoeira 100: An Illustrated Guide to the Essential Movements and Techniques. Blue Snake Books. ISBN 9781583941768.
