= Bencao =

Bencao may refer to:

- Xinxiu bencao, Chinese pharmacopoeia
- Bênção, capoeira kick
