= Scorpion kick (capoeira) =

Kick from an inverted position in capoeira

Rabo de arraia
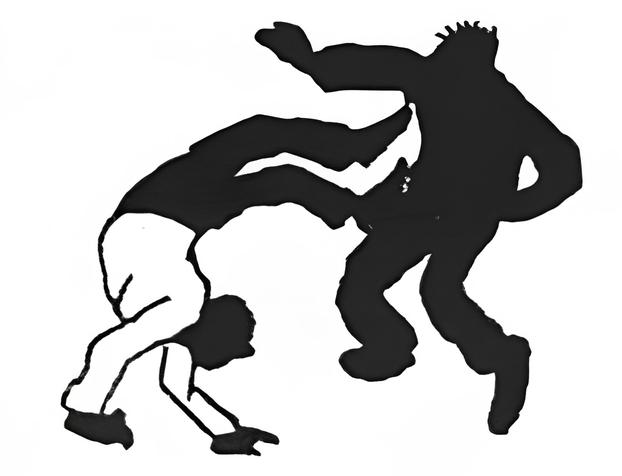
- Drawing by Raul Pederneiras, Revista da Semana, 1926
- Name: Rabo de arraia
- Meaning: stingray tail
- AKA: scorpion
- Type: kick
- Parent style: capoeira Angola capoeira carioca
- Parent technique: rabo de arraia, engolo scorpion kick
- Child technique(s): with both legs kicking; with one leg kicking; with one leg grabbed by the opponent; from a kidney fall
- Escapes: various esquivas

In capoeira, escorpião (scorpion), originally known as rabo de arraia (stingray tail), is a distinct inverted kick over the head, resembling the stingray's or scorpion strike.

Rabo-de-arraia with both legs is one of the most dangerous capoeira technique, both for the person who executes it and for the one who receives it. If executed properly, it can have fatal consequences for the opponent. Capoeiristas rarely use this move today, except as a last resort, as it goes against one of the basic principles of capoeira: to always avoid close combat. The kick was successfully used in a famous match against jujutsu champion in 1909.

Rabo de arraia is very old capoeira technique, which was very popular in capoeira carioca and capoeira Angola. The same technique is found in African martial art engolo, the ancestral art of capoeira.

The position is similar to the scorpion pose in yoga, but in capoeira it primarily serves as a kick.

== Names ==
Rabo de arraia (stingray tail) is the oldest name for this technique, which is still used in literature. However, rabo de arraia is also a generic capoeira term for inverted kicks over the head, including meia lua de compasso, with all its variations.

Other names for this kick include pantana (swamp), which is no longer commonly used, and escorpião (scorpion), which is the current name for some variations of the technique.

== Origin ==
Scorpion kick is one of the distinct engolo kicks, first documented in drawings from 1950s. It is not common among today's old practitioners, but some of them known how to execute it when asked.

Many inverted positions of engolo and capoeira, are believed to have originated from the use of handstand by nganga imitating their ancestors, who walked on their hands in the spirit world.

== History ==
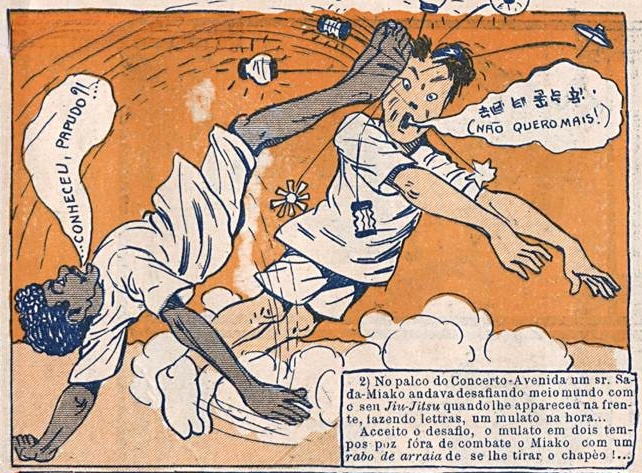
Panel by Alfredo Storni featuring capoeirista Francisco da Silva Ciríaco defeating jiu-jitsu fighter Sada Miyako with a rabo de arraia kick, O Malho, 1909.

In the 19th century, the rabo de arraia was a popular kick in Rio's capoeira carioca. It was also known as pantana in Rio.

In 1909, there was a famous match when a capoeirista Francisco da Silva Ciríaco defeated a Japanese jujitsu champion Sada Miyako with the double legged rabo de arraia kick. Japanese martial arts champions visiting Brazil frequently challenged locals to free-style contests. In 1909, Sada Miyako was challenged by Ciríaco da Silva, a black docker and capoeira mestre. The match drew a sizable crowd in a specially erected pavilion on Avenida Central. After the victory, Ciríaco was carried out on the shoulders and hailed as a national hero in Rio.

== Technique ==
The capoeirista starts the rabo de arraia by placing the palms of their hands on the ground. The capoeirista then kicks backward over their head at a target in front of them. Instead of looking forward like in a regular handstand, the player extends their neck and whips one leg out in a backflip kick.

The height of the kick depends on the target. The escorpião is very hard to see and is extremely dangerous in the hands of a master.

== Application ==
To someone who does not know capoeira, this blow may seem absurd. The player stands on his hands in front of his opponent and hits the opponent's head with his heel. But those who have had the chance to use it on the proper occasion know its effectiveness and its destructive power, given the element of surprise as well as the enormous force of the kick.

— Nestor Capoeira

This technique allows a player to go under the opponent's kick, such as armada, queixada, meia-lua-de-compasso, etc., and then attack unexpectedly and with an extremely powerful and devastating blow.

The value of the scorpion kick lies in its unexpected delivery angle. When someone is in a crouched position on all fours and facing their opponent, akin to a cat, the opponent is not anticipating a kick arriving directly over the top of the head.

== Variations ==
There are different versions of this inverted kicking technique in capoeira. The variants include:

- escorpião em pé (scorpion on foot), where one foot remains on the ground while other is kicking.
- escorpião na queda de rins (scorpion in kidney fall), ground version of the kick, from queda de rins position.
- escorpião de cotovelo (scorpion on elbow), with the elbow as a support.

=== With both legs kicking ===
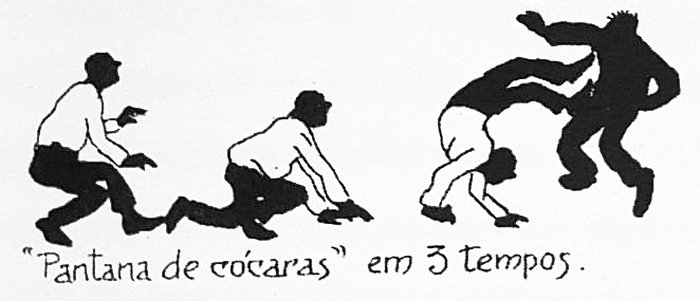
Raul Pederneiras, pantana de cócoras (squatting swamp), Revista da Semana, 1926.

The capoeirista approaches the opponent and suddenly throws their body into a somersault, supporting themselves with their hands on the ground while kicking both feet towards the opponent's head.

The initial position resembles a handstand, but with an arched back, chin in, head forward, chest thrust out, and legs arched back, mimicking a scorpion's tail. The player should descend quickly and, while rapidly supporting both hands on the ground, kick with both feet to the opponent's face or chest. The result of this move is almost always, even when successful, falling on top of the opponent.

The contemporary name for this technique is double scorpion (escorpião duplo) or just scorpion. It was also known as patana de frente (front swamp) or pantana de cócoras (squatting swamp) in 1920s.

In capoeira carioca, there also existed a side version of this kick called patana de lado (side swamp).

=== With one leg kicking ===
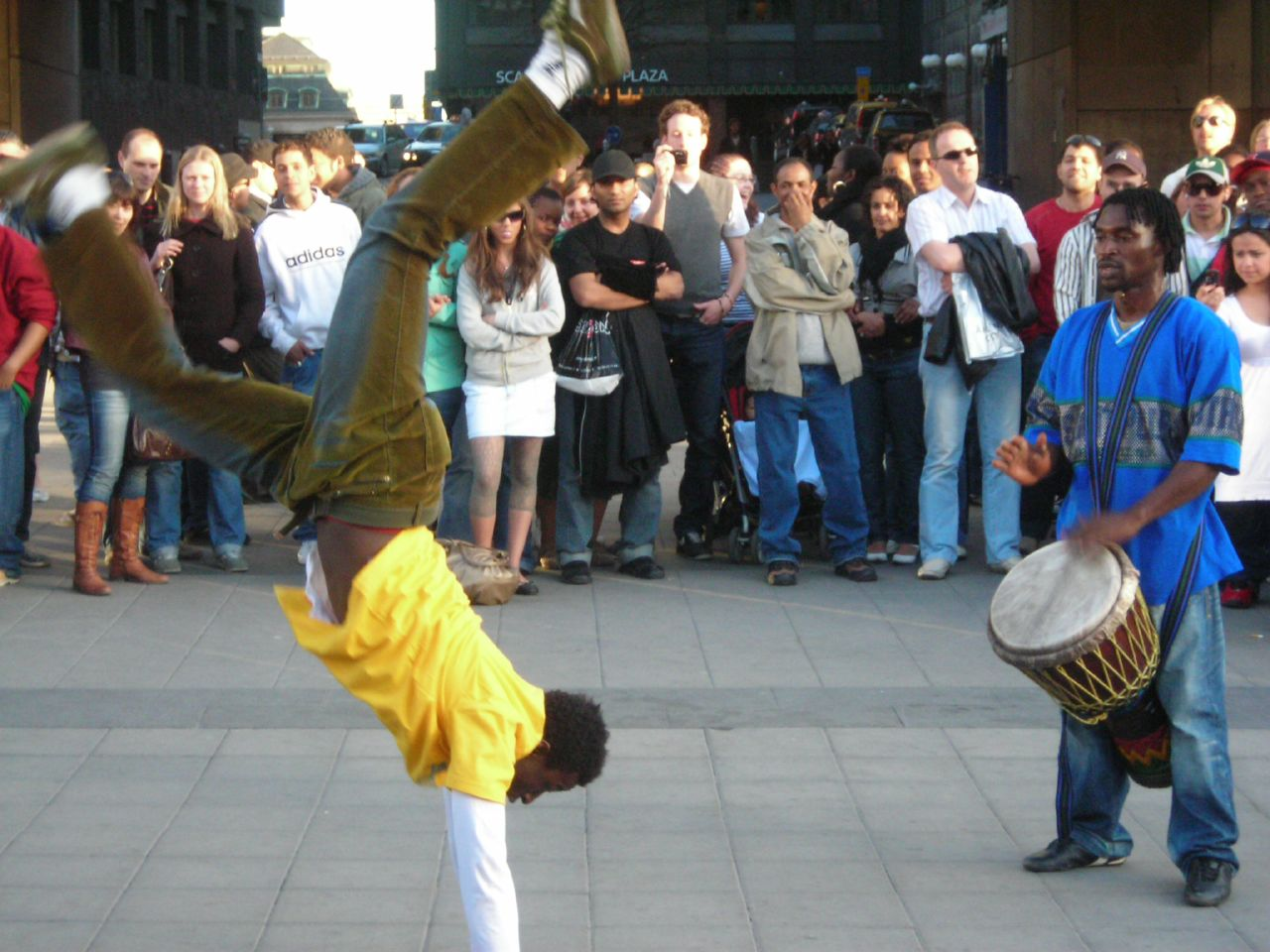
Scorpion kick on the streets of Stockholm.

This rabo di arraia version is performed by kicking up into a handstand. The kick is done with the heel aimed at the opponent's head. After completing it the capoerista returns to its position. It is common to first contact with one heel and then kick with another, or to alternate both legs before returning to the original position.

=== With one leg grabbed by the opponent ===
Rabo de arraia amarrado (tied stingray tail) is one of the great traps of capoeira for novices. If an opponent grabs a capoeirista's leg in a fight, the capoeirista can throw themselves sideways to the ground while supporting themselves with both hands. Having three points of support, the capoeirista can move their leg back and deliver a powerful blow to the opponent's head. Some Capoeira players will even cunningly offer their foot to the opponent so that they can grab it and provide the necessary support for the technique.

Burlamaqui describes the use of this technique to outsmarting the opponent. First, the opponent is given a tapping coup. After they grabbing it, the capoeirista rotates in a way that the hands firmly plant on the ground, and the other foot kicks the opponent horribly in the face or ears, which almost always has serious consequences. According to Burlamaqui, "this is a beautiful blow due to its style, because it depends solely on intelligence".

=== From a headstand ===
The name of this variant is escorpião de cabeça (scorpion on head) or escorpião cabeça no chão (scorpion with head on the ground), and it serves as an acrobatic demonstration.

In this movement, the player is in a headstand, balancing on their two outstretched hands. From the headstand, they lower their legs towards the ground, creating a scorpion-like shape by bending at the base of the spine.

=== Escape version ===
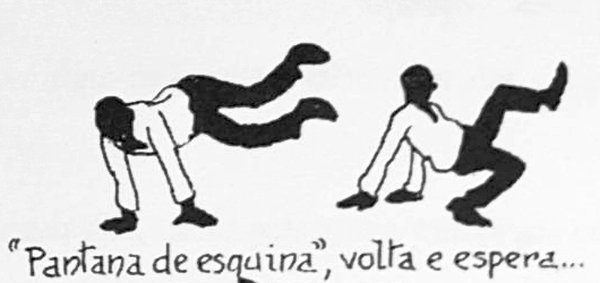
Raul Pederneiras, pantana de esquiva, Revista da Semana, 1926.

Patana de esquiva (escape swamp) is an evasive exit for patana kick, regularly used if the capoeirista misses the target. So, after a miss of the pantana part, the player continues into the queda de tres position.

== Literature ==
- Burlamaqui, Anibal (1928). Gymnástica nacional (capoeiragem), methodisada e regrada. Rio de Janeiro.
- Da Costa, Lamartine Pereira (1961). Capoeiragem, a arte da defesa pessoal brasileira. Rio de Janeiro: Oficial da Marinha.
- Assunção, Matthias Röhrig (2002). Capoeira: The History of an Afro-Brazilian Martial Art. Routledge. ISBN 978-0-7146-8086-6.
- Capoeira, Nestor (2002). Capoeira: Roots of the Dance-Fight-Game. Blue Snake Books. ISBN 978-1-58394-637-4.
- Capoeira, Nestor (2007). The Little Capoeira Book. Blue Snake Books. ISBN 9781583941980.
- Desch-Obi, M. Thomas J. (2008). Fighting for Honor: The History of African Martial Art Traditions in the Atlantic World. Columbia: University of South Carolina Press. ISBN 978-1-57003-718-4.
- Taylor, Gerard (2012). Capoeira 100: An Illustrated Guide to the Essential Movements and Techniques. Blue Snake Books. ISBN 9781583941768.

== See also ==
- Rabo de arraia
- Scorpion pose
- List of capoeira techniques
