= Kandeka =

Martial art tradition

Kandeka (also Khandeka) was a martial art tradition of Kunene people in Angola, and could refer to stick-fighting, slapboxing, or a war dance. According to Desch-Obi, primary among these was stick fighting.

Kandeka stick fighting was linked to cattle, and the male were expected to dominate and defend their herds. Sticks serve as essential tools for both pastoral subsistence activities and upholding social respect. The stick was a primary form of self-defense against surprise raids, wild animals, or own bulls. Kandeka could be a communal event, a personal pastime, a harmless sparring session, or a violent conflict over livestock or honor.

The kandeka slap fighting provided younger boys with a chance to participate in combat games before the more earnest engolo matches commenced.

== Name ==
The term kandeka is clearly related to okukandeka, meaning “to avoid or prevent”.

== History ==
The Kunene people were renowned for their exceptional martial skills. In the 1840s, British observer George Tams noted that caravans passing through their territory often carried a wide array of weapons due to the dangerous nature of trade. However, he was particularly impressed by a group that used only clubs in their conflicts with the Giagas, who were skilled in archery. Tams describes the deadly combat stick:

They never exceed two feet in length, and are seldom above an inch in diameter at the butt-end, while the thickest part is only double the circumference; but as they are made of heavy wood, generally guajak, this circumstance renders them doubly dangerous, by the facility with which they are handled, and apparently it does not require much strength to inflict a fatal blow.

One Portuguese observer also noted in the 1840s:

They are the people most certainly known for the game of stick fighting, by this they are most respected. There are Negroes so experienced that [when throwing the stick] and wanting it to hit with the head of the stick or the butt end, can do so when hitting a little target at the distance of sixty to eighty feet!

In Kunene society, the skill in stick fighting held significant importance, with fighters highly valuing their sticks. Tams described the “butt end is usually oblong, and is cut into sharp angles and edges, and the whole club is covered with carved figures.” António Nogueira, who lived among the Humbe people in the 1850s, described the kandeka stick duel as a form of conflict resolution:

The duel among them has an original form that is worthy of mention. When two men become infuriated to the point of seeking aggression, however rare, the relatives or friends of both give them a stick prepared in the moment from any tree, remove any [other] weapons that they may carry, and invite them to fight in order to remove the fury from their hearts. Then both champions cudgel each other until one of them or both feel satisfied, and usually end up the combat by mutual reconciliation.

== Kandeka slap-boxing ==
In addition to a stick-fighting, kandeka also referred to a slap-boxing match practiced primarily by young males. Informal matches occurred within households as a source of amusement. Often more intense slap-boxing contests unfolded among young boys while they grazing cattle.

At various parties and festivals, particularly before the engolo proper, public ritual displays occurred in dance circles. In this ritualized public display, slap-boxing kandeka matches involved a large circle of Kunene boys and men, who both played music and could become combatants. An outer circle of community members participated musically, maintaining a steady clapped rhythm while individual fighters led call-and-response songs. These songs involved everyone present responding with the chorus.

Once the music had captivated the crowd, a fighter would enter the circle, raising his open hands above his head as a challenge. Another fighter, often one who considered himself skilled or superior to the challenger, would step into the circle with dance-like movements, raising his open hands with palms forward to demonstrate his guard. Once paired off, the two fighters aimed to slap each other in the face or body, employing dodges and parries to avoid their opponent's strikes. The confrontation ended when one participant landed a significant hit that discouraged their rival from continuing.

== See also ==
- Engolo

== Literature ==
- Desch-Obi, M. Thomas J. (2008). Fighting for Honor: The History of African Martial Art Traditions in the Atlantic World. Columbia: University of South Carolina Press. ISBN 978-1-57003-718-4.
