= Albano Neves e Sousa =

Portuguese poet and painter (1921–1995)

Albano Neves e Sousa

Albano Neves e Sousa (1921 in Matosinhos, Portugal – 1995 in Salvador, Bahia, Brazil) was a Portuguese-Angolan painter, poet, writer and ethnographer. He was born in Portugal, lived in Angola and, after 1975, in Brazil.

Albano Neves e Sousa is considered an important figure in Angolan art history. His work provides a visual record of Angola, depicting its people and landscapes, and is closely connected to the cultures of Angola and Brazil.

Neves e Sousa documented the Angolan martial art n'golo through drawings made in the 1950s, highlighting similarities between engolo and the Afro-Brazilian martial art capoeira. These drawings have been cited by some researchers in discussions about possible connections between Angolan combat traditions and the development of capoeira, although the nature of this relationship remains debated.

== Biography ==
Albano Silvino Gama de Carvalho das Neves e Sousa was born on January 15, 1921, in Matosinhos, Portugal, during one of his family's trips to Portugal.

=== Life in Angola ===
At a young age, he returned to Angola with his family, settling in Andulo in the province of Bié. He was sent to Luanda to attend high school, where he discovered his talent for painting.

At the age of 15, Sousa held his first exhibition in Andulo in 1936, featuring watercolors, drawings, and caricatures. He spent most of his life in Angola, traveling extensively around the country, producing drawings and paintings inspired by its landscapes, people, and wildlife. In 1937, he held his first solo exhibition in Luanda.

Sousa's career took a significant turn when he joined the ethnographic studies mission at the Museum of Angola while living in Luanda. This experience allowed him to explore Angola's diverse landscapes and cultures, influencing his artistic works.

In 1943, Sousa received a scholarship from the Luanda city council to study Fine Arts in Porto, Portugal. During this period, he collaborated with various art groups and won several awards.

Returning to Luanda in 1952, Sousa faced criticism from cultural media for his early exhibitions, which were seen as imitative of cubism. Nevertheless, he continued to evolve as an artist and gained recognition both locally and internationally. His career involved numerous exhibitions and travels to countries such as South Africa, Yugoslavia, Belgium, Brazil, Spain, Mozambique, Portugal, and more.

Around 1955, Neves e Sousa documented the n'golo dance during a visit to Mucope, in Cunene Province.

In 1965, Albano Neves e Sousa visited the academy of Mestre Pastinha in Salvador, Brazil. During the visit, he informed practitioners about an Angolan dance similar to capoeira, known as n'golo. After observing capoeira Angola at Pastinha's academy, he reportedly stated that "N’golo is capoeira". His testimony contributed to discussions about possible historical connections between n'golo and capoeira, and was cited by some researchers in debates about African influences on the development of capoeira.

Upon returning to Angola in 1966, Neves e Sousa organized an exhibition titled "Da minha África e do Brasil que eu vi" (From My Africa and the Brazil I Saw), highlighting cultural similarities between African and Afro-Brazilian expressions.

=== Life in Brazil ===
In 1975, Sousa was commissioned to decorate an Angolan Boeing 737, which led him to travel to the United States. However, the Angolan Civil War started that year, and he moved to Brazil.

Sousa eventually settled in Salvador, Bahia, with his wife, Maria Luisa. There, he found inspiration in the local culture and landscapes. He also authored a book titled "Olohuma," reflecting his experiences in Bahia.

His works continued to be influenced by the legacy of the transatlantic slave trade and the strong African cultural presence in Bahia. Sousa celebrated the similarities and connections between Bahia and Angola, particularly through his art's focus on landscapes, people, customs, and spirituality.
