= Meia lua de compasso =

Martial arts technique

- Animated sequence of the kick.
- Name: Meia lua de compasso
- Meaning: compass crescent
- AKA: Rabo de arraia
- Type: kick
- Parent style: capoeira Angola
- Parent technique: engolo okuminunina kick, rabo de arraia
- Child technique(s): Meia lua presa; Meia lua solta; Meia lua de compasso com queda de rins; Meia lua de compasso dupla; Meia lua reversão; Meia lua pulada
- Escapes: esquiva, negativa
- Counters: meia lua de compasso

Rabo de arraia (stingray tail) or meia-lua de compasso (compass crescent) is a distinct technique found in the martial arts of engolo and capoeira, that combines an evasive maneuver with a reverse kick.

It is one of the most powerful capoeira kicks, along with the rasteira. A capoeirista's general skill level can be determined on how hard and fast they are able to execute a meia-lua de compasso.

The kick is done with the heel. It is extensively used in the "low game."

== Names ==
In literature, this kick is called both meia lua de compasso and rabo de arraia. Rabo de arraia (stingray tail) is a parent term used in capoeira for inverted kicks over the head, including meia lua de compasso and scorpion.

In engolo, the class of spinning kicks with hands on ground is called okuminunina or okusanene komima in Bantu.

== Origin ==
Meia-lua de compasso, along with many other movements that are now considered the trademark of capoeira, was developed within Angolan martial art engolo. The inverted positions of engolo and capoeira, including the handstand, aú and rabo de arraia, are believed to have originated from the use of handstand by Bantu shamans imitating their ancestors, who walked on their hands in the spirit world.

One myth describes how the African slaves who created capoeira were forced to develop their techniques while having their hands chained, which gave birth to golpes rodados (spinning attacks) in which hands were put on the ground to support their bodies.

== History ==
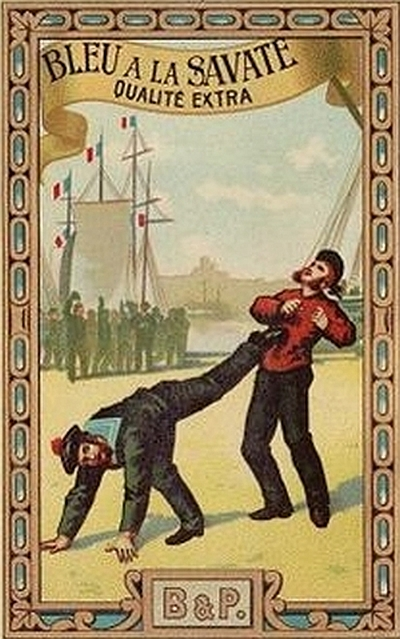
A savate illustration from the 19th century, showing French sailors doing a kick similar to a rabo de arraia.

In the 19th century, the "rabo de arraia" was a popular kick in Rio's capoeira carioca. There are also illustrations from the same period depicting French sailors, savate fighters, using the same strike.

In 1909, there was a famous match when capoeirista Francisco da Silva Ciríaco defeated a Japanese jujitsu champion Sada Miyako with the rabo de arraia kick. Although it is often interpreted that he used a meia lua de compasso, according to Anibal Burlamaqui he used a different rabo de arraia version known as the scorpion today.

Meia lua de compasso was introduced in mixed martial arts in 2009 by Brazilian fighter Marcus "Lelo" Aurélio (also known as Professor Barrãozinho), who knocked out his opponent Keegan Marshall with it. He was followed in 2011 by Cairo Rocha, who knocked out Francesco Neves with a meia-lua de compasso.

In 2017, Ollie Flint knocked Aaron Grey with a meia lua, although the result was changed to a no contest due to external reasons. The following year, Elizeu Zaleski dos Santos used a hands-free meia lua to knock out Sean Strickland in UFC 224. Manny Apkan also scored another KO by meia lua de compasso over Connor Hitchens in Cage Warriors in 2022.

== Technique ==
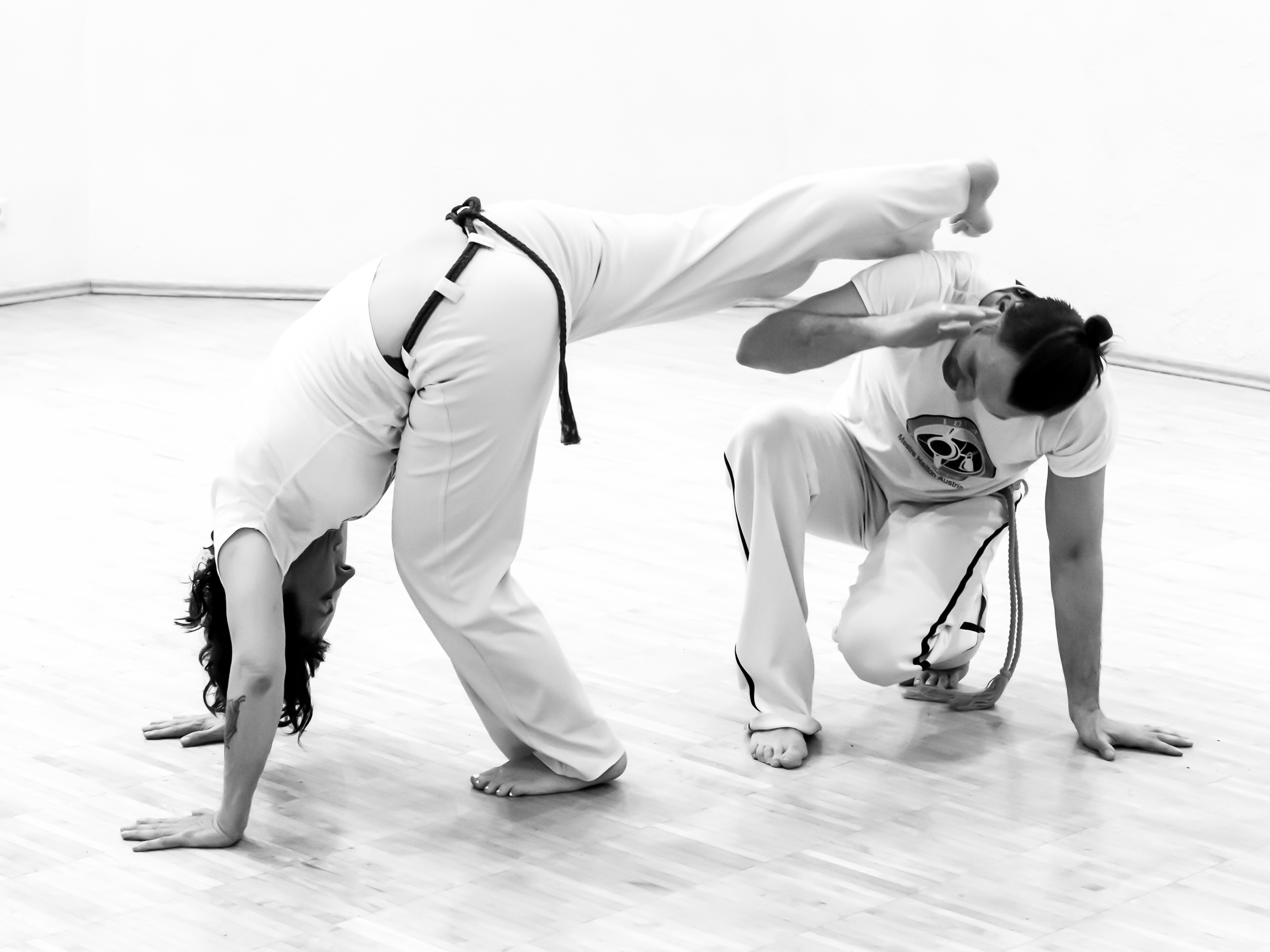
Rabo de arraia

Rabo de arraia can be executed from the ginga or from the ground negativa position. The head and torso swinging down from the ginga generate the additional momentum for the kick. Before kicking, it is important to place the hands on the floor and look at the target through them. Meia lua de compasso can be performed with both hands on the floor or with one on the floor and the other protecting the face.

The kick movement is a whip-like rotation. The kicking leg is forcefully thrown in a wide arc, with the heel pointed at the target. The kick passes through the target and ends on the ground at the same point as it began. The kicking leg should be very straight, although the support leg can be bent. To allow the kicking leg to move freely, the body rotates around the supporting leg. As the body turns, the one arm and leg naturally lift off the ground. After the kick, the player comes back to ginga position again.

The kick generally aims at the opponent's head. The contact area could be the lateral part of the foot, or the heel of the kicking foot. Rabo de arraia can be applied to various areas of the body, thus making it more complex than it appears at first glance. It can be aimed at the various areas of the opponents's body, including face, chest, ribs and belly. The kick has numerous modalities depending on where it is applied. The kick is highly adaptable and can spin toward the opponent from various angles, with rapid changes of direction.

If the kick starts from the standing or semi-crouched position, the capoeirista twists his body towards one side, downing one or both hands onto the ground for balance, and launches the opposite leg into the air in a semi-circular motion that ends with his heel striking the opponent, usually in the head, or completing the spin into a ginga position. The power of the kick derives its energy from the similar centripetal force of a golf club swing.

== Variations ==
=== With one hand ===
Some players performs meia lua de compasso with one on the floor and the other protecting the face. This version is known as Meia-lua presa (locked crescent).

=== Hands-free ===
Meia-lua solta (free crescent) is the version of the basic kick without hands on the ground. It is executed in a similar way to meia lua de compasso, except the hands are kept close to the body to protect the face.

Some capoeiristas simply throw the leg back, turning the body in such a way that the heel hits the opponent in front. It is faster than the basic kick, but also much riskier. This powerful kick should be used with caution, especially when used alongside or by less experienced players. Getting a foot sweep while performing this can be dangerous because of the lack of a supporting arm.

Some authors refer to hands-free compass crescent as a chibata (whip) because of its fast whipping motion.

=== With queda de rins ===
Meia-lua queda de rins.

Meia-lua de compasso com queda de rins is a combination of a meia-lua de compasso and a queda de rins. In this move, the player starts a meia lua de compasso as usual but transitions into a queda de rins at the point of contact with the target.

While turning to release the kick, the capoeirista lowers himself unto his supporting elbow. The movement can be completed in a number of ways, for example by transiting into the resistençia.

=== Reversed ===
Meia-lua reversão (reversed compass crescent) is a that begins as a meia-lua de compasso but ends like a front walkover. The capoeirista releases the kick, but instead of bringing the kicking leg around to complete the motion, he follows the kick with his entire body. He will usually land on the kicking leg and rotate 180 degrees to face the other player again.

=== Double ===
Meia-lua de compasso dupla.

Meia-lua de compasso dupla (double compass crescent) is a version of the kick done without either leg in contact with the ground. It combines the motions of a diagonal front handspring and a meia-lua compasso using only the hand or hands to support the body during the kick and complete the spin. It is rarely seen because engaging the core muscles that it uses requires a high level of balance and strength.

=== Jumping ===
Meia lua pulada (jumping crescent) is a kick frequently used in Rio de Janeiro.

The player starts a motion resembling the start of a hand-spin, reaching diagonally towards the floor with their hand moving across the body, and then follows through with the kick, striking with the heel.

== In popular culture ==
Professional wrestler John Morrison has used this kick in several occasions, as well as film actors and stuntmen Lateef Crowder and Marrese Crump.

== See also ==
- Rabo de arraia
- Reverse roundhouse kick
- List of capoeira techniques

== Literature ==
- Burlamaqui, Anibal (1928). Gymnástica nacional (capoeiragem), methodisada e regrada. Rio de Janeiro.
- Da Costa, Lamartine Pereira (1961). Capoeiragem, a arte da defesa pessoal brasileira. Rio de Janeiro: Oficial da Marinha.
- Pastinha, Mestre (1988). Capoeira Angola. Fundação Cultural do Estado da Bahia.
- Assunção, Matthias Röhrig (2002). Capoeira: The History of an Afro-Brazilian Martial Art. Routledge. ISBN 978-0-7146-8086-6.
- Capoeira, Nestor (2007). The Little Capoeira Book. Blue Snake Books. ISBN 9781583941980.
- Desch-Obi, M. Thomas J. (2008). Fighting for Honor: The History of African Martial Art Traditions in the Atlantic World. Columbia: University of South Carolina Press. ISBN 978-1-57003-718-4.
- Taylor, Gerard (2012). Capoeira 100: An Illustrated Guide to the Essential Movements and Techniques. Blue Snake Books. ISBN 9781583941768.
