= Aú =

Cartwheel in capoeira

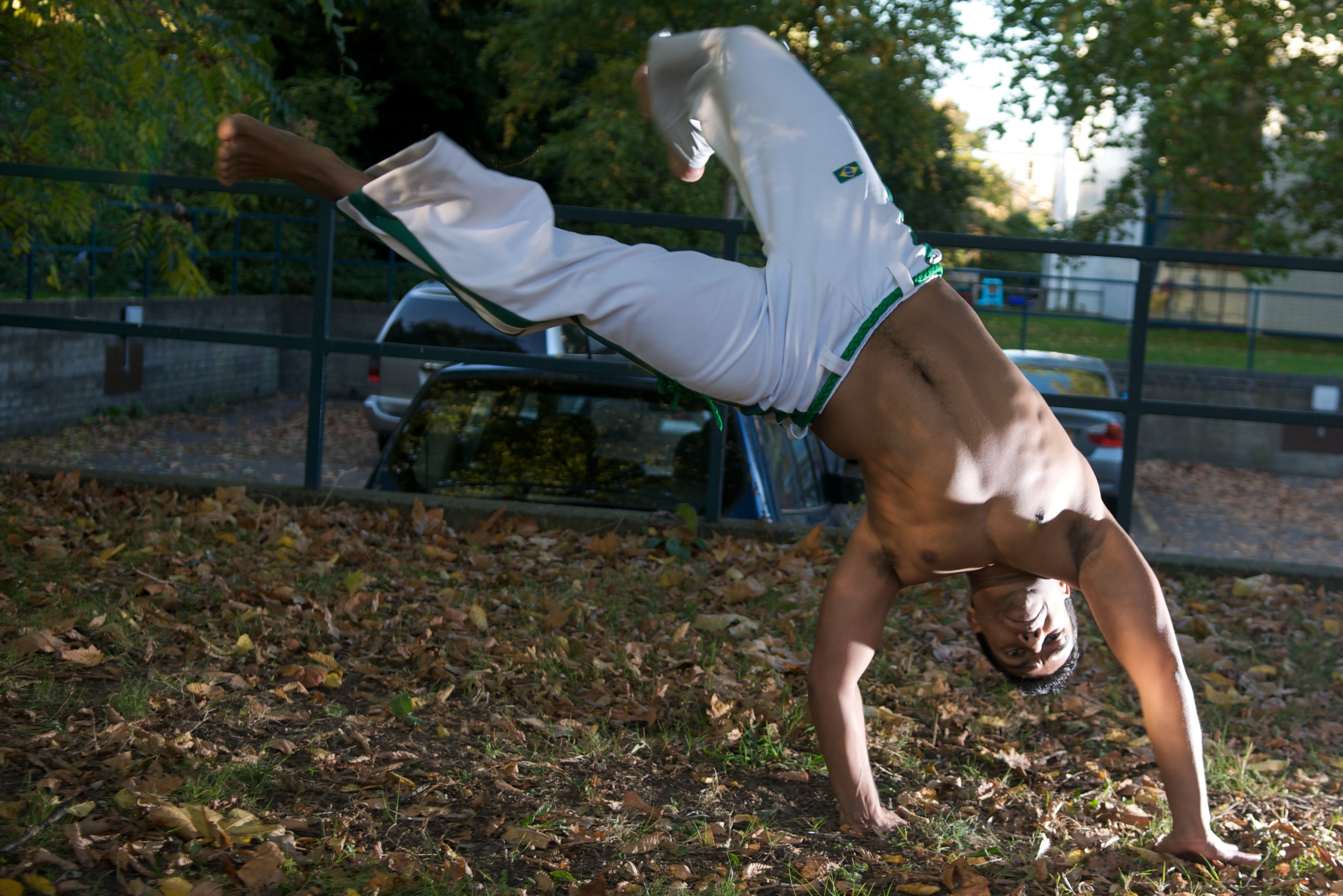
- Aú in capoeira.
- Name: Aú
- Meaning: cartwheel
- Type: kick, move, escape
- Parent style: capoeira Angola
- Parent technique: engolo cartwheels
- Child technique(s): aú batido; aú batendo; aú helicóptero; aú chibata; aú fechado; aú de cabeça; aú sem mão

Aú is the capoeira term for a cartwheel. The purpose of the "aú" in capoeira includes mobility, offense and evasion. The aú has similarity to handstand in capoeira (bananeira), but it differs because the body rotates laterally with an energetic impulse.

While inverted, there is a risk of receiving a low headbutt, front push kick, or some other attack. To prevent this an emphasis is placed on closely watching the movements of the opponent instead of the ground.

== Origin ==
The typical inverted positions of engolo and capoeira, including the handstand, aú, rabo de arraia, and others, are believed to have originated from the use of the handstand by Bantu shamans imitating their ancestors, who walked on their hands in the spirit world.

== Purpose ==
Aú is a valuable resource for the capoeirista, especially when faced with multiple attackers, allowing them to perform jumps from several meters away.

Through aú, one can both defend and attack. In capoeira, the cartwheel belongs to set of unexpected movements that disorient opponents, disrupt their balance, and may even open their guard. The cartwheel can be a versatile move for both offense and evasion. Upside-down techniques, like the "au", enhance a capoeirista's unpredictability and movement options.

Through the au, beginners learn how to maintain balance while in motion upside-down. Mastering the cartwheel is one of the first steps in helping beginners handle awkward real-life fight situations, like slips, being thrown, or grappling.

These upside-down movements also teach players that capoeira, like life, isn't merely about winning and losing. Life is filled with battles and struggles, but it's equally important to learn how to dance, be poetic, have fun, be unpredictable (not always rational and objective), and embrace a touch of craziness and chaos to truly savor the best of life and capoeira.

— Nestor Capoeira

== Cartwheel kicks ==
=== Cartwheel kick (aú batido) ===
Cartwheel kick is found in engolo, ancestor art of capoeira. Engolo developed multiple cartwheel kicks as part of its offensive repertoire. The Buntu name for the techniques is okusana omaulo-ese (using handstand/cartwheel to kick down).

One arm is used to support the body in the air while one leg performs a high kick directed at the opponent's head or torso. The aú batido was introduced successfully in mixed martial arts by Anthony Pettis, who has a capoeira background.

=== Kicking cartwheel (aú batendo) ===
The kicking cartwheel (aú batendo) is similar to the cartwheel kick (aú batido), but it is executed with both hands on the ground and delivers multiple kicks. The initial leg lifted before executing the aú initiates the kick, while the second leg extends back to maintain balance against the weight of the front kicking leg.

It is usually aimed downward onto an opponent in esquiva or negativa position. As a floreio, some players just quickly switching the legs back and forth while in handstand.

=== Helicopter (helicóptero) ===
Helicopter kick

Helicopter (helicóptero) is a fast and unexpected kicking technique, essentially a rotating twist from cartwheel that propels a kick while in an inverted position. This helicopter kick is a deceptive attack. Initially, it appears the player is moving in one direction with cartwheel, but due to body twist, they kick back in the original direction.

In a friendly capoeira game, the intent is not to strike aggressively but to fluidly integrate this movement with the opponent's techniques at close range.

=== Cartwheel whip (aú chibata) ===
Cartwheel whip (aú chibata) is a heel kick that leverages the body's twisting and spinning momentum, causing one leg to whip down onto the target with significant speed and force. The technique can be done slowly and under control, resulting in a negativa, or it can be done forcefully and quickly, resulting in a nearly standing position.

Au chibata is a powerful kick that can be dangerous if not controlled. It is often used as a leaping and showy movement, rather than to actually hit an opponent. Due to its potentially violent force, it is seldom suitable to actually kick someone during the game.

To come out of the movement, the player can transfer their weight to their right hand and continue on their way by rolling (rolé) to the right.

Some authors referred to this movement as compasso.

== Cartwheel moves ==
=== Closed cartwheel (aú fechado) ===
Closed cartwheel (aú fechado) is a variation of the cartwheel. In au fechado, the legs are kept close to the body, rather than being extended out to the sides. This makes the movement more compact and defensive, as it protects the chest and head from attack. The closed cartwheel allows the player to move around the capoeira circle quickly and easily, like a normal cartwheel, but it makes the player less vulnerable to headbutt and other frontal attacks. The aú compasso can be performed from an esquiva or many other movements.

There's a variation of closed cartwheel, called aú compasso, where legs are kept straight, aimed downward to protect the player's body.

=== Headstand cartwheel (aú de cabeça) ===
Headstand cartwheel (aú de cabeça or aú cabeça no chão) is a cartwheel with the head on the floor. It is effective for moving and changing directions on the ground. A player can transition into it from different movements, for example standard cartwheel, negativa lateral or moenda.

=== Aerial cartwheel (aú sem mão) ===
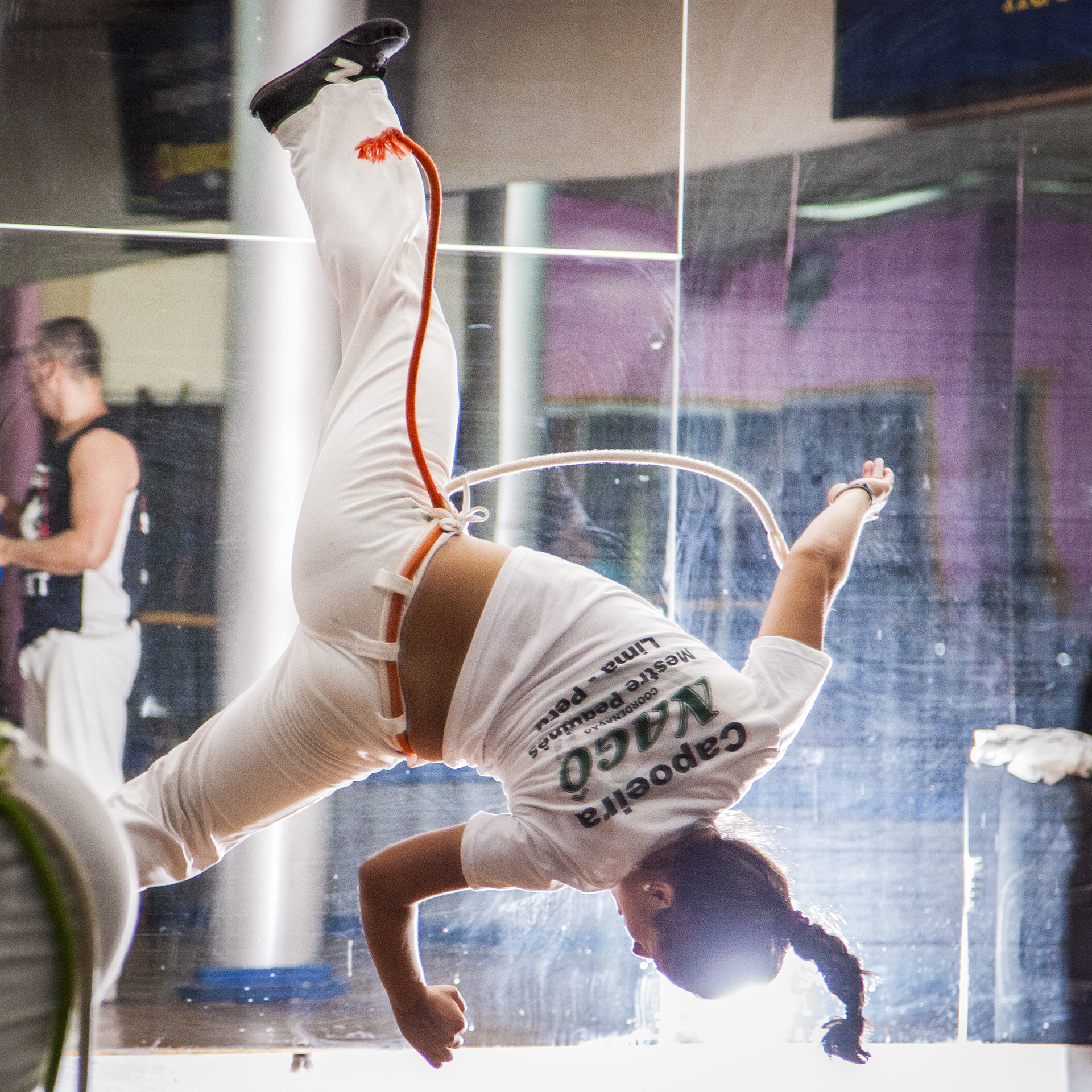
Aerial cartwheel in capoeira

Aú sem mão (cartwheel without hands) is the name for aerial cartwheel in capoeira.

This astonishing acrobatic move is used solely to showcase skills and add excitement to the game. Its advantage lies in its forward-facing execution, allowing players to seamlessly incorporate it into the game without a run-up. Some traditionalists critique acrobatics purely for show, claiming they lack relevance to the core jogo de dentro.

To perform this move, one should swing one's hands and torso in a U-shaped motion, using their waist as the pivot. This is the "dip" phase. After the U-shaped motion, the person should kick one's back leg to start the rotation and push one's front leg up for more height. They should bring one's arms in for better rotation and keep one's legs as straight as possible. Landing should be on the leading leg.

== Literature ==
- Pastinha, Mestre (1988). Capoeira Angola. Fundação Cultural do Estado da Bahia.
- Capoeira, Nestor (2007). The Little Capoeira Book. Blue Snake Books. ISBN 9781583941980.
- Desch-Obi, M. Thomas J. (2008). Fighting for Honor: The History of African Martial Art Traditions in the Atlantic World. Columbia: University of South Carolina Press. ISBN 978-1-57003-718-4.
- Taylor, Gerard (2012). Capoeira 100: An Illustrated Guide to the Essential Movements and Techniques. Blue Snake Books. ISBN 9781583941768.

== See also ==
- Cartwheel (gymnastics)
- List of capoeira techniques
