= Rabo de arraia =

Capoeira technique

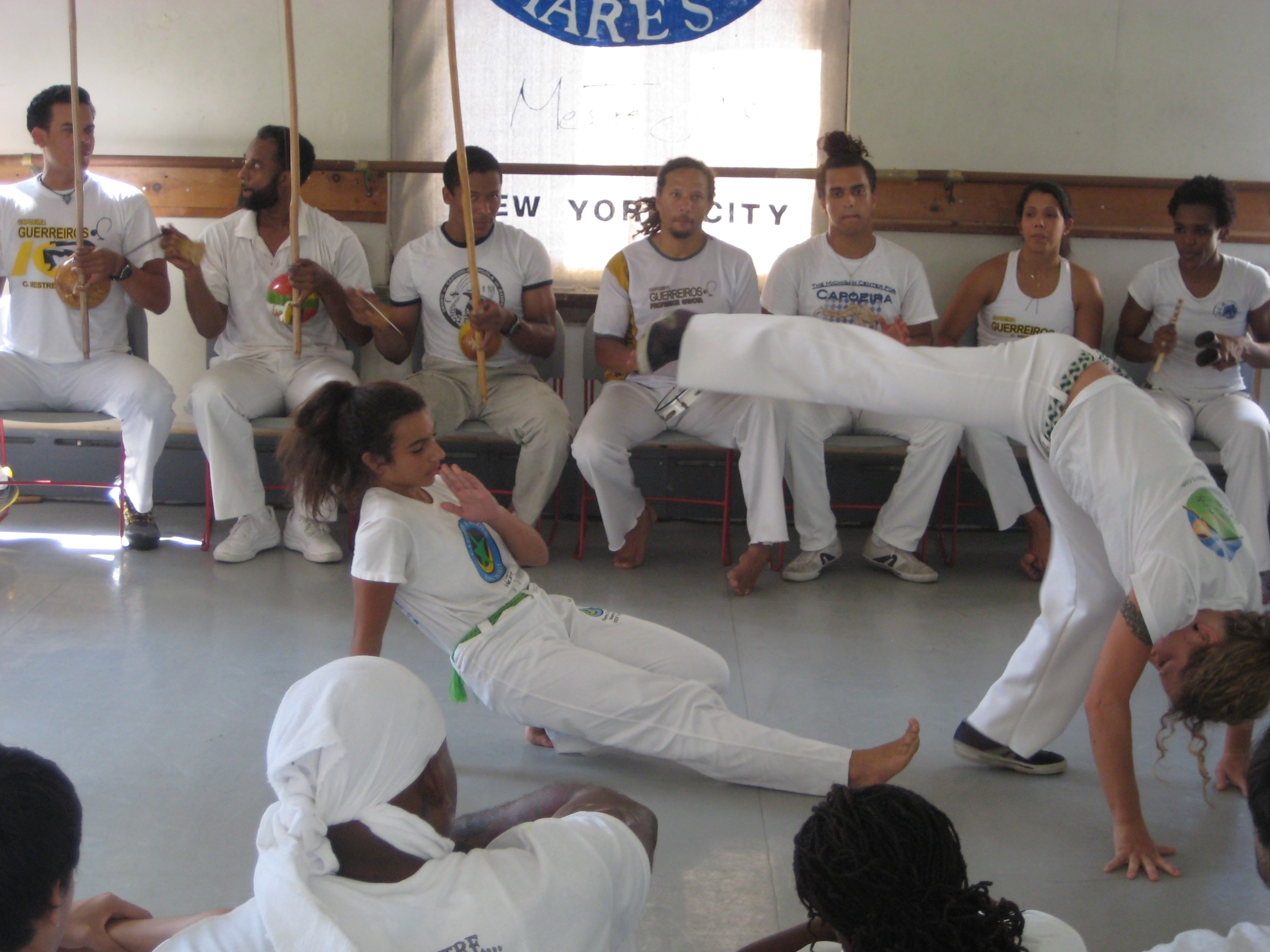
- Rabo de arraia & negativa.
- Name: Rabo de arraia
- Meaning: stingray tail
- Type: Kick
- Parent style: capoeira Angola
- Parent technique: engolo okuminunina kick
- Child technique(s): meia lua de compasso; scorpion kick; pantana de lado
- Escapes: esquiva, negativa

Rabo de arraia (lit. stingray's tail) is a parent technique in capoeira for inverted kicks over the head, resembling the stingray's strike. This parent term includes following major techniques:

- Meia lua de compasso with its variations, the traditional rabo-de-arraia in capoeira Angola.
- Scorpion kick with its variations, the traditional rabo-de-arraia in capoeira carioca.

In Brazil, the rabo-de-arraia is probably the kick "most associated with capoeira", although it's important to note that this term encompasses a range of distinct movements.

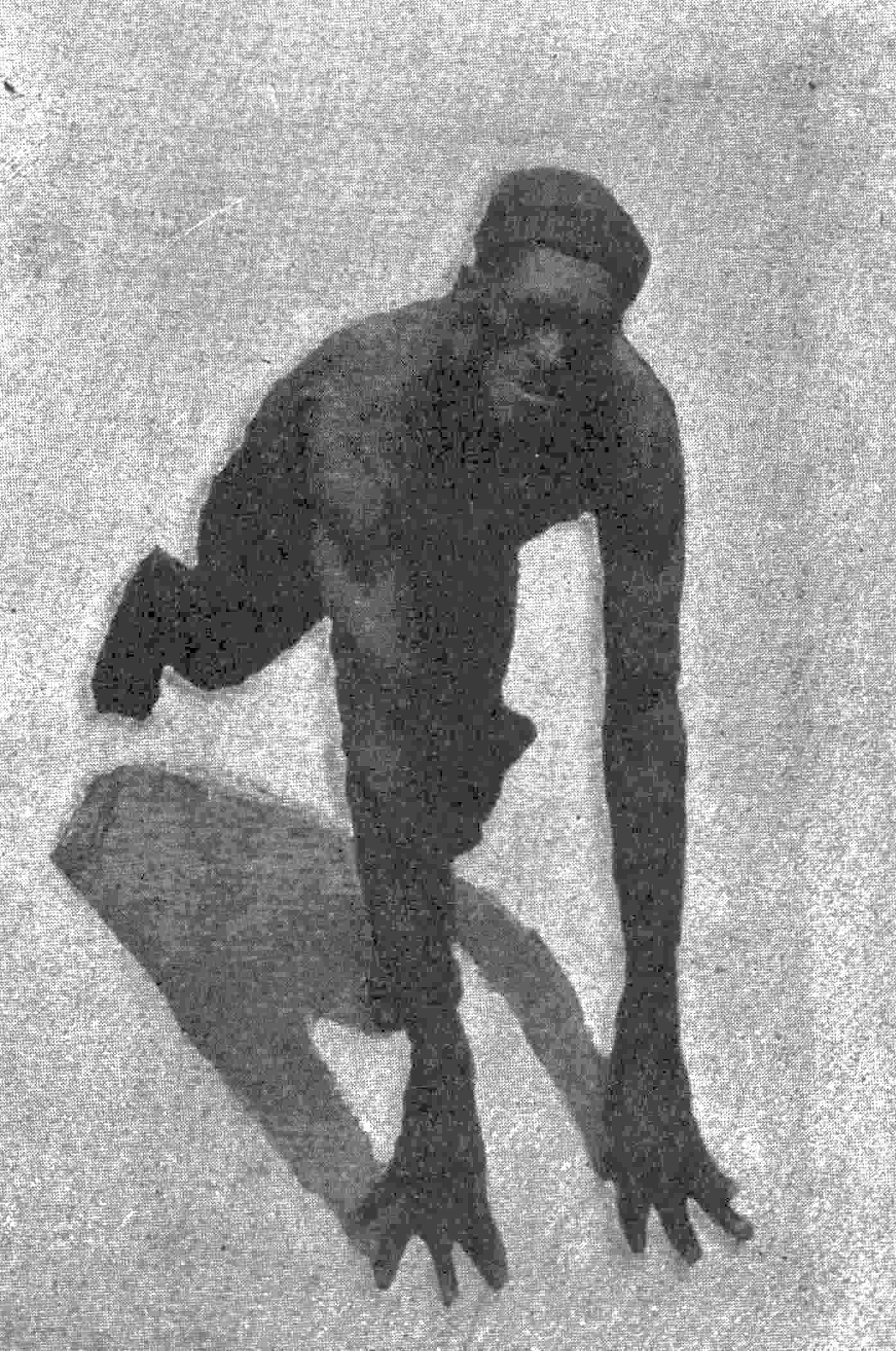
Francisco da Silva Ciríaco showing how to prepare a "rabo de arraia", O Malho (1909)

All techniques taught to children begin from initial "rabo de arraia" crouching position.

== Terminology ==
Although the term "rabo de arraia" is mostly used as a generic term, some authors use it for specific child techniques, such as:

- handsfree version of meia lua de compasso
- low version of meia lua de compasso
- the scorpion with both legs kicking
- the scorpion with one leg kicking

== Origin ==
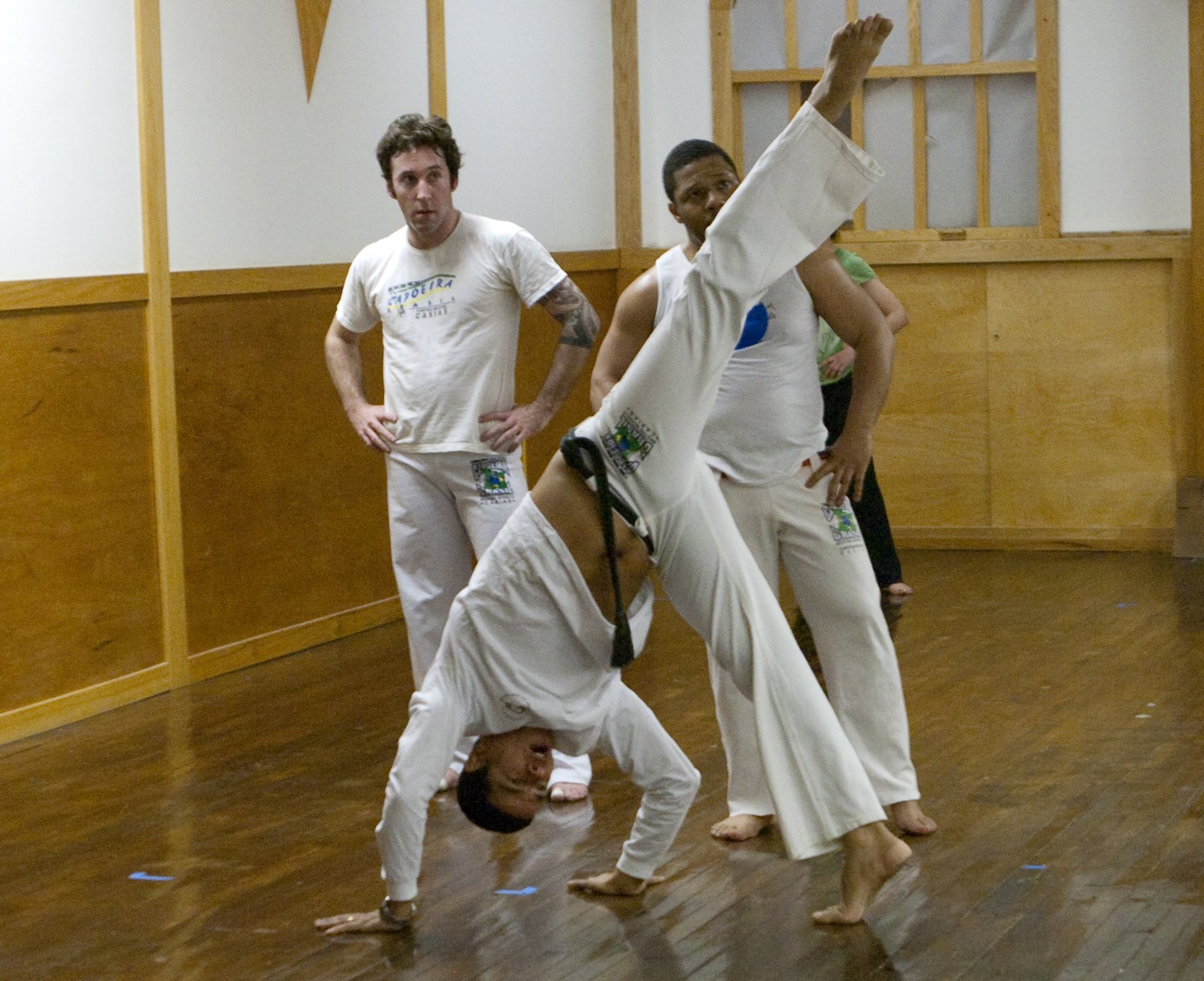
Common position both for scorpion and meia lua de compasso.

Though specific movements known as rabo de arraia (meia lua de compasso and scorpion kick) were originally developed in the African martial art n'golo. Inverted positions, which form the basis of all these techniques, are believed to have originated from the use of handstand by Bantu shamans imitating their ancestors, who walked on their hands in the spirit world.

In engolo, the class of spinning kicks with hands on ground is called okuminunina or okusanene komima in Bantu.

== History ==
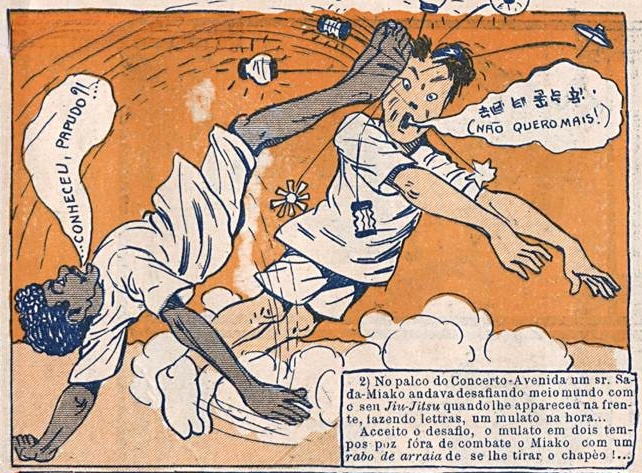
Panel by Alfredo Storni featuring capoeirista Ciríaco defeating jujitsu fighter Sada Miyako with a rabo de arraia kick, O Malho, 1909.

In the 19th century, the "rabo de arraia" was a popular kick in Rio's capoeira carioca.

In 1909, there was a famous match when a capoeirista Francisco da Silva Ciríaco defeated a Japanese jujitsu champion Sada Miyako with the rabo de arraia kick. Japanese martial arts champions visiting Brazil frequently challenged locals to free-style contests. In 1909, a Japanese champion teaching ju-jitsu in Rio was challenged by Ciríaco da Silva, a black docker from Campos. The match drew a sizable crowd in a specially erected pavilion on Avenida Central. After the victory, Ciríaco was carried out on the shoulders after the match and hailed as a national hero in Rio.

Although it is often interpreted that he used a meia lua de compasso, according to Anibal Burlamaqui, Ciríaco used a different rabo de arraia technique known as the scorpion today.

== Child techniques ==
=== Scorpion ===
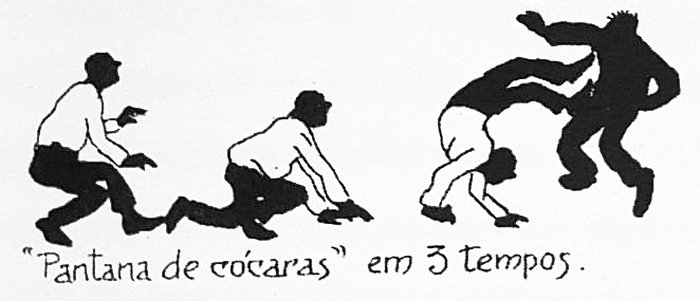
Rabo de arraia as pantana or scorpion kick

Pantana (swamp) or escorpião (scorpion), originally known as rabo de arraia (stingray's tail), is a distinct inverted kick over the head, resembling the stingray's or scorpion strike.

This is one of the most dangerous capoeira technique, both for the player who executes it and for the one who receives it. If executed properly, it can have fatal consequences for the opponent.

This rabo de arraia is very old capoeira technique, which was very popular in capoeira carioca and capoeira Angola.

=== Meia lua de compasso ===
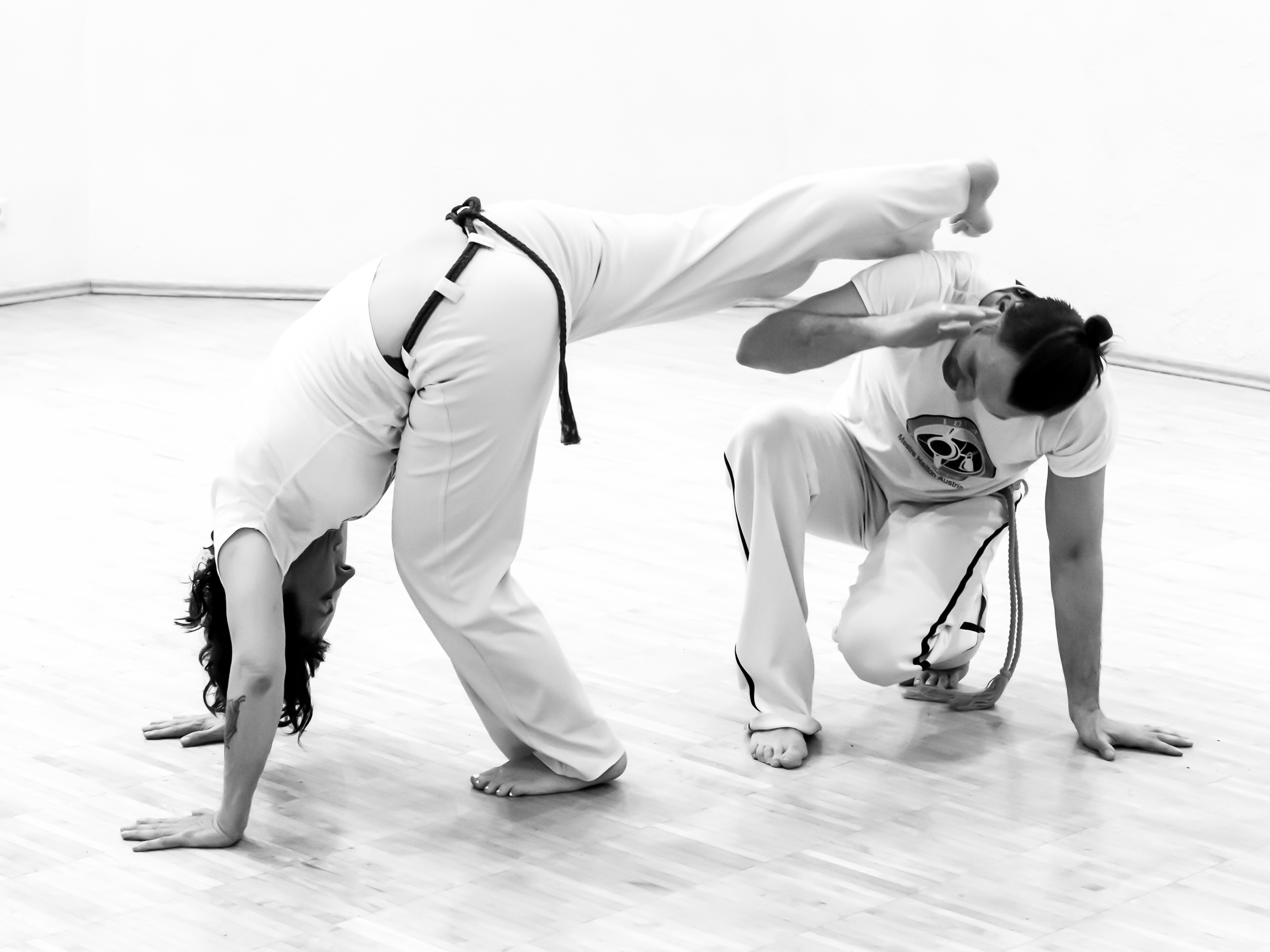
Rabo de arraia as meia lua de compasso

Rabo de arraia or meia-lua de compasso (compass crescent) is a distinct technique found in the martial arts of engolo and capoeira, that combines an evasive maneuver with a reverse kick.

It is one of the most powerful capoeira kicks and one of its most iconic movements along with the rasteira. It is even considered that a capoeirista's general skill level can be determined on how hard and fast they are able to execute a meia-lua de compasso.

The kick is done with the heel.

=== Pantana de lado ===
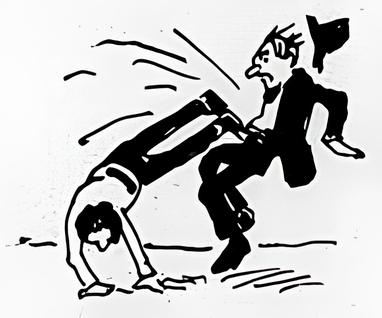
Raul Pederneiras, rabo de arraia as pantana de lado, Revista da Semana, 1926.

Patana de lado (side swamp) is a side version version of patana or rabo de arraia kick. The capoeirista starts from initial "rabo de arraia" crouching position, then enters a movement similar to a cartwheel, and then at the exit kicks the opponent with both feet.

The pantana de lado kick is no longer commonly used by its original name in modern capoeira. The modern kick similar to it is meia-lua de compasso dupla.

== Literature ==
- Burlamaqui, Anibal (1928). Gymnástica nacional (capoeiragem), methodisada e regrada. Rio de Janeiro.
- Pastinha, Mestre (1988). Capoeira Angola. Fundação Cultural do Estado da Bahia.
- Capoeira, Nestor (2002). Capoeira: Roots of the Dance-Fight-Game. Blue Snake Books. ISBN 978-1-58394-637-4.
- Assunção, Matthias Röhrig (2002). Capoeira: The History of an Afro-Brazilian Martial Art. Routledge. ISBN 978-0-7146-8086-6.
- Capoeira, Nestor (2007). The Little Capoeira Book. Blue Snake Books. ISBN 9781583941980.
- Desch-Obi, M. Thomas J. (2008). Fighting for Honor: The History of African Martial Art Traditions in the Atlantic World. Columbia: University of South Carolina Press. ISBN 978-1-57003-718-4.
- Taylor, Gerard (2012). Capoeira 100: An Illustrated Guide to the Essential Movements and Techniques. Blue Snake Books. ISBN 9781583941768.
