= Tsutsumi Hōzan =

Japanese swordsman

Tsutsumi Hōzan (堤宝山), also known as Tsutsumi Yamashiro no kami Hōzan (堤山城守宝山), was a swordsman during the Sengoku period (16th century) of Japan, who founded Hōzan ryū (Tsutsumi Hōzan Ryū).

== Life ==
Tsutaumi Hōzan was the twelfth disciple of the famed monk Jion. Jion had fourteen disciples, each in a separate region of Japan to spread his art, Nen ryū, across the country. Hōzan was said to have been an adept at fighting with the jitte, even at a young age. Hōzan was also proficient at the art of jujutsu, which was a significant part of his Hōzan-ryū. Although his teacher, Jion, died before Hōzan had learned all of Nen ryū's basics ("techniques of the past"), he is said to have mastered its teaching ("techniques of the future") due to his ability with the jitte, which is simpler to wield than a sword, as the jitte is a single handed weapon.

It is believed that Hōzan, or one of his disciples had transmitted the art of the jitte to Hirata Shokan, Miyamoto Musashi's grandfather. It is for this reason the Miyamoto family taught the art of the jitte for many generations. Musashi himself is said to have learned Jion's Nen ryū through Hōzan's jitte, which would have greatly influenced the single-handed method of Musashi's Hyōhō Niten Ichi-ryū.

== Sources ==
- Kenji Tokitsu Miyamoto Musashi: His Life and Writings
- Serge Mol Classical Fighting Arts of Japan pp. 151.
