= Mixed martial arts competition for children =

Rules on mixed martial arts competition for children vary. In most U.S. states, there is no central organization in charge of children competing in mixed martial arts also known as Pankration (MMA). In some states it is a misdemeanor to hold these competitions. California is the only state with official rules, regulations and recognized bouts for children. The non-profit United States Fight League is the delegated organization to oversee and administer the rules and regulations for the sport.

Kids MMA, once regulated in the state of Missouri is now banned by legislation championed by MMA promoter Jesse Finney as part of HB 1388, a comprehensive bill shifting amateur competition oversight from amateur sanctioning groups to the state athletic commission. There was no allegations of injuries or misconduct associated by the ban so it appears that prohibition of youth MMA was part of the mechanism that removed amateur sanctioning groups.

To ensure the children's safety in fights, California put slight but substantial differences into the rules. At other places, many are discussing that teaching boxing to children can be beneficial for their overall well-being. Most present day youth MMA competitions occur in California, Florida, Texas, South Carolina and Tennessee.

== Famous former youth MMA fighters ==
Several United States Fight League youth fighters have been accepted to the UFC and One Fighting Championships.

UFC

- Brian Ortega
- Joseph Morales
- Cody Bollinger
- Jacob Rosales
- Kay Hansen
- Raul Rosas Jr.
- Clayton Carpenter

One Championships

- Angela Lee
- Christian Lee
- Victoria Lee
- Lea Bivins

Bellator

- Aaron Pico
- Lucas Brennan

== World Championships for Youth ==
The first World MMA championships for youth occurred in August 2019 in Rome, Italy. 26 nations and 253 youth fighters participated, with the United States beating out Ukraine and Russia for the first place national team. Due to the COVID epidemic, no world championships was held in 2020. 2021 saw 331 athletes from 23 nations compete at the IMMAF youth Worlds in Sofia, Bulgaria with Ukraine, Russia and USA placing as the top teams. The 2022 World Championships had 479 athletes from 42 nations with Ukraine, United States and Tajikistan placing as top teams.

Since its inception many media sources have covered the sport to include:

- Capradio
- National Geographic
- Sherdog
- Galileo (Germany)
- Yahoo Sports
- Vice Sports
- Time Magazine
- Inside MMA
- USA Today
- Sunday Night (Australia)
- The Doctors
- Fox and Friends

== Rule differences ==
=== Safety ===
Children competitors generally wear more padding than adults in an effort to make the sport less brutal and decrease the chances of injuries. In adult MMA the only visible protection is the open-fingered gloves. Children must wear *headgear (*California requirement), shin guards, and the open-fingered gloves. In addition, children are not allowed to strike the head or perform other potentially dangerous techniques. The United States Fight League uses a unique point-based scoring system which promotes technique over brutality in youth contests. The rule differences are in place to protect the children and yet still allow them to participate in the same venue as adults.
