= Tsutsumi Hōzan-ryū =

- Ko-ryū

Foundation
- Founder: Tsutsumi Hōzan

Arts taught
- Art: Description
- Jujutsu: Hybrid art, unarmed or with minor weapons
- Bōjutsu: Staff art
- Kenjutsu: Sword art
- Iaijutsu: Sword drawing art
- Naginatajutsu: Glaive art
- Tessenjutsu: Iron fan art
- Hojōjutsu: Rope-tying and restraining art
- Sakkatsuhō: Resuscitation methods

Ancestor schools
- Nen Ryu

Descendant schools
- Hans de Jong Self Defence School

Tsutsumi Hōzan-ryū (堤宝山流) or Hōzan-ryū is a koryu sogo bujutsu or complete Japanese martial art.

Founded by Tsutsumi Hōzan (Tsutsumi Yamashiro no kami Hōzan), the date of its founding is debatable. The most likely time for its founding would have been in the late 14th or early 15th century. Since Tsutsumi Hōzan was the 12th disciple of the priest Jion, it is safe to assume that the sword style of Tsutsumi Hōzan-ryū would have been based upon Jion's Nen Ryu. Hōzan was also adept with the jitte and at jujutsu, originally referred to as yoroi kumi (grappling in armor). Traditionally, Tsutsumi Hōzan-ryū also included the yari (spear), bo (staff), torinawa or hojojutsu (tying techniques), and kusarigama. Some also suggest the manriki or manriki-gusari (chain) and chigiriki and jo (staff and chain) may have been included in the system.

== After the Meiji Restoration ==
The majority of the weapon arts, including the sword work, were lost at the turn of the 20th century. A single sword technique, hatten giri (not hachiten giri), which means "eight heaven cuts," was included in the forms for the Japanese police sword school, the Keishicho Ryu Gekken Kata in 1886. It is worth noting that none of the teachers at the police academy at the time were said to have been teachers of Tsutsumi Hōzan-ryū. Also, at this time the art was only being taught in Kyoto and Himeji.

The last known teacher of Tsutsumi Hōzan-ryū, Tsutsumi Masao, is said to have been a supporter of the ‘new’ art being developed by Jigoro Kano, called Judo. It is hard to say after his death, in 1898, what remained of Tsutsumi Hōzan-ryū, and what had been influenced by judo. Conversely, it is hard to say if Tsutsumi had any influence on the creation of judo, as did other styles in those days. One of Tsutsumi Masao's students, Katsukuma or Katsuguma Higashi, came to the United States in the early 1900s and engaged in bouts with American wrestlers. Higashi's record is somewhat debatable, but for his small size, and young age, he did quite well against the professional US wrestlers. Due to the age of Higashi when he arrived in the US, and the fact that his teacher had died several years earlier, one may assume that Higashi had not been as adept as he and his promoter, H. Irving Hancock, boasted. The book written by Higashi and Hancock, The Complete Kano Jiu-Jitsu (Judo), shows a very distinct difference between other early works published on judo, which are remarkably modern for the time (e.g. Arima's Judo: Japanese Physical Culture). This suggests that Tsutsumi Hōzan-ryū Jujutsu may have been quite different from judo.

Tsutsumi Hōzan-ryū also appears in Europe in the 1900s. In Germany, Erich Rahn began teaching Tsutsumi Hōzan-ryū Jujutsu to the Berlin Police in 1906. By the 1930s jujutsu, presumably Tsutsumi Hōzan-ryū, but referred to as “European Jiu-jitsu,” had spread across Germany and Austria with three Federations and over 100 clubs. One possible source for this may have been Higashi, who left the US for France and then Germany in 1905. No trace of Higashi after traveling to Germany can be found.

== Today ==
Today, Tsutsumi Hōzan-ryū only exists in Australia, brought there by the late Jan de Jong. His son, Hans de Jong, states that his father was instructed in the art from 1927-1945 by two Japanese brothers, S. Saito (8th dan), and K. Saito (7th dan), in Indonesia, in the 1920s and '30s. Both of these men were students of Tsutsumi Masao. A further indication of its legitimacy is that the modern Tsutsumi Hōzan-ryū Jujutsu practiced in Australia does indeed resemble Tsutsumi's art as depicted in Higashi's book, with the signature leg techniques, long since removed from judo. The art in Australia is a goshin jutsu (self-defence art) and hence is not taught in the traditional kata forms seen in most koryu jujutsu. Instead, a kata/randori mix is used, referred to as Shinken Shobu no Kata ("form of true/live fighting"). This may be an influence from judo, although it is claimed to be a traditional characteristic of Tsutsumi Hōzan-ryū. Hence, the current state of the art is more Gendai budō (modern martial art) as opposed to Koryu (classical). The majority of teachers in Australia do not claim to be teaching Koryu, but simply self-defence jujutsu. Jan de Jong died in April 2003.

== Sources ==
- Serge Mol. Classical Fighting Arts of Japan: A Complete Guide to Koryu Jujutsu (2001). pp. 151. ISBN 9784770026194.
