= Sada Miyako =

Early practitioner of Jiujitsu and Judo in Brazil

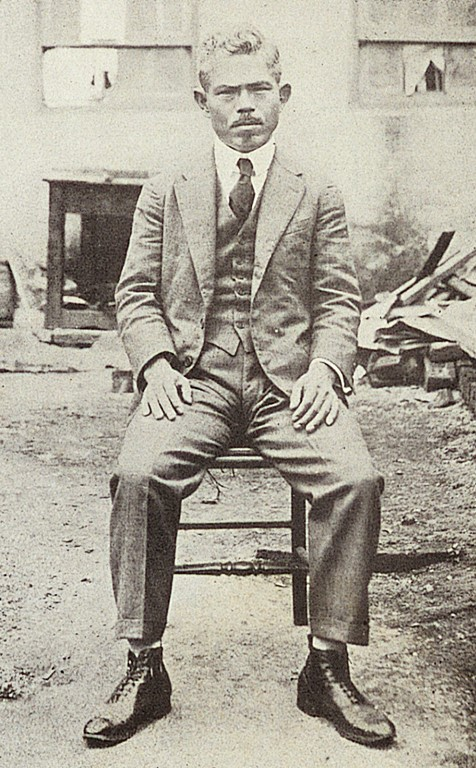
Saku Miura.

Saku Miura (三浦鑿, December 6, 1881 - October 25, 1946), also known as Sada Miyako, was a Japanese journalist and practitioner of jujutsu and judo. He was one of the first instructors of the art in Brazil.

== Life ==
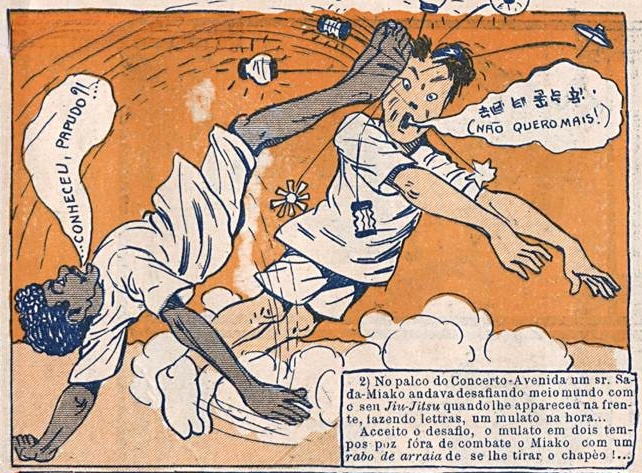
Panel by Alfredo Storni featuring capoeirista Ciríaco defeating jujitsu fighter Sada Miyako with a rabo de arraia kick, O Malho, 1909.

In 1908 he and M. Kakihara were tasked to teach Japanese Jiujitsu to Brazilian sailors. This predates the arrival of Konde Koma by six years. The purpose of his instruction was to enable practitioners to suppress their adversaries.

He engaged in an the famous vale tudo fight between himself and capoeirista Francisco da Silva Ciríaco in which he was knocked out. This fight was in 1909 and was witnessed by Agenor Moreira Sampaio. This match was a demonstration of the early rivalry between Capoeira and Jiujitsu. It was as a result of this loss that Jiujitsu faced a steep decline in Brazil. One of his students was Mario Aleixo.

== Journalism ==
In 1919 he purchased a newspaper and became its president. Miyaku was eventually expelled from Brazil as a result of his anti authority stances.

== Mixed martial arts record ==
Professional record breakdown
1 match	0 wins	1 loss
By knockout	0	1
By submission	0	0
Draws	0	

Fight record
0 wins, 1 losses, 0 draws
Date	Result	Opponent	Location	Method	Time	Record
May 1, 1909	Loss	(Brazil) Ciríaco da Silva		KO (kicks)		0–1–0
Legend: Win Loss Draw/No contest Exhibition Notes

== Sources ==
- Lacé Lopes, André Luiz (2015). A capoeiragem no Rio de Janeiro, primeiro ensaio : Sinhozinho e Rudolf Hermanny. Editorial Europa. ISBN 978-85-900795-2-1.
- Silva, Elton; Correa, Eduardo (2020). Muito antes do MMA: O legado dos precursores do Vale Tudo no Brasil e no mundo. ISBN 979-8615504471.
