= Erich Rahn =

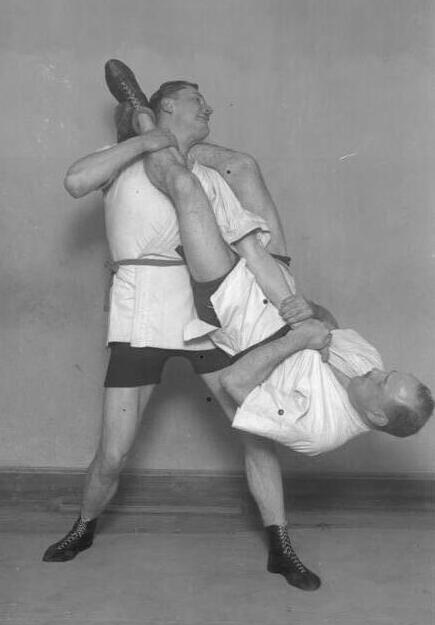
- Rahn demonstrating a flying armbar in 1931.
- Born: May 1, 1885; Berlin, Germany
- Died: July 6, 1973 (aged 88); Berlin, Germany
- Occupations: Martial artist, actor and writer
- Known for: European jujutsu

Erich Rahn (May 1, 1885 - July 6, 1973) was a German martial artist, actor and writer. He pioneered the practice of jujutsu and judo in Germany, being called the "founder of European Jiu-Jitsu".

== Biography ==
He contacted Japanese martial arts through his father, a wealthy businessman with contacts in the show business, where Japanese martial artists hosted challenges and exhibitions. In one of those, Rahn met Katsuguma Higashi, a master from the Tsutsumi Hōzan-ryū jujutsu school, who defeated a much bigger man in front of the audience. Impressed, Rahn became his apprentice and left his job to become a full time martial artist. In 1906, at 21 years old, he opened the first jujutsu school in Germany, in which he created a system mixing his art with boxing, wrestling and strength training. Four years later, he became a hand-to-hand instructor for the Kriminalpolizei and several police and military units in Berlin.

After World War I, in 1919, Rahn initiated a tour of exhibitions in an attempt to re-popularize jujutsu, accepting challenges from boxers and wrestlers, whom he defeated handily. He also emphasized the art's fitness aspects, marketing it to women women on the claims that practicing jujutsu helped one look young even in mature age. His efforts were successful, and in 1920 he opened a school in Berlin, and in 1920 he hosted the first national jujutsu championships in the Berlin Sportpalast, which he won after defeating Hans Reuter in the finals. He retired shortly after, becoming solely a teacher, and after receiving a visit by Jigoro Kano in 1935, he expanded his activities to judo. He died in 1973.

== Works ==
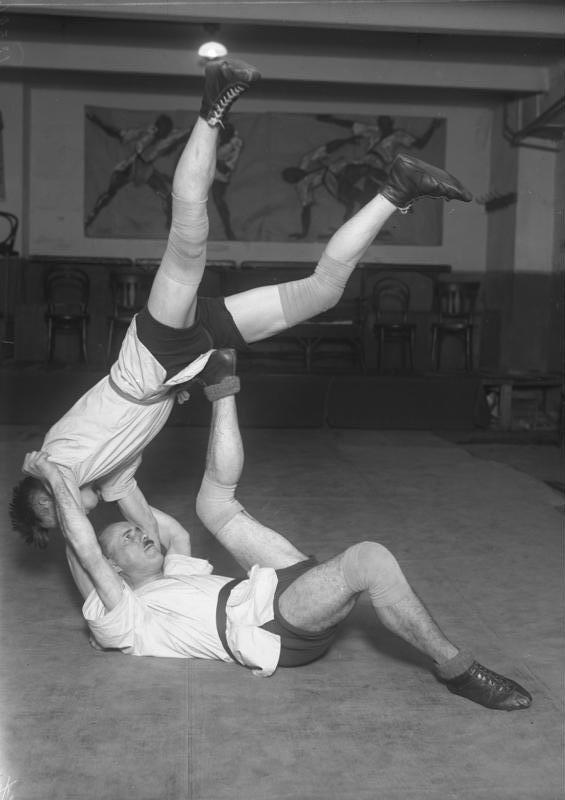
Rahn demonstrating tomoe nage in 1931.

- Die unsichtbare Waffe (Jiu-Jitsu). Verlag Guido Hackebeil A.G., Berlin 1926
- Neue Griffe und Kniffe im Jiu-Jitsu/Judo, Waffenlose Selbstverteidigung. Falken-Verlag, 1955
- Ich lerne Jiu-Jitsu. Fackelverlag, 1957

== Filmography ==
- 1918: Midnight - Jujutsu master
- 1921: Jiu-Jitsu – Die unsichtbare Waffe - himself

== Bibliography ==
- Thorsten Preiß, Erich Rahn. Wegbereiter des Jiu-Jitsu in Deutschland, 2012, Foundation Günter Beining, ISBN 978-3-00-038403-5
- Maestro Erich Rahn in Zendoryu
