= Francisco da Silva Ciríaco =

Brazilian capoeira master

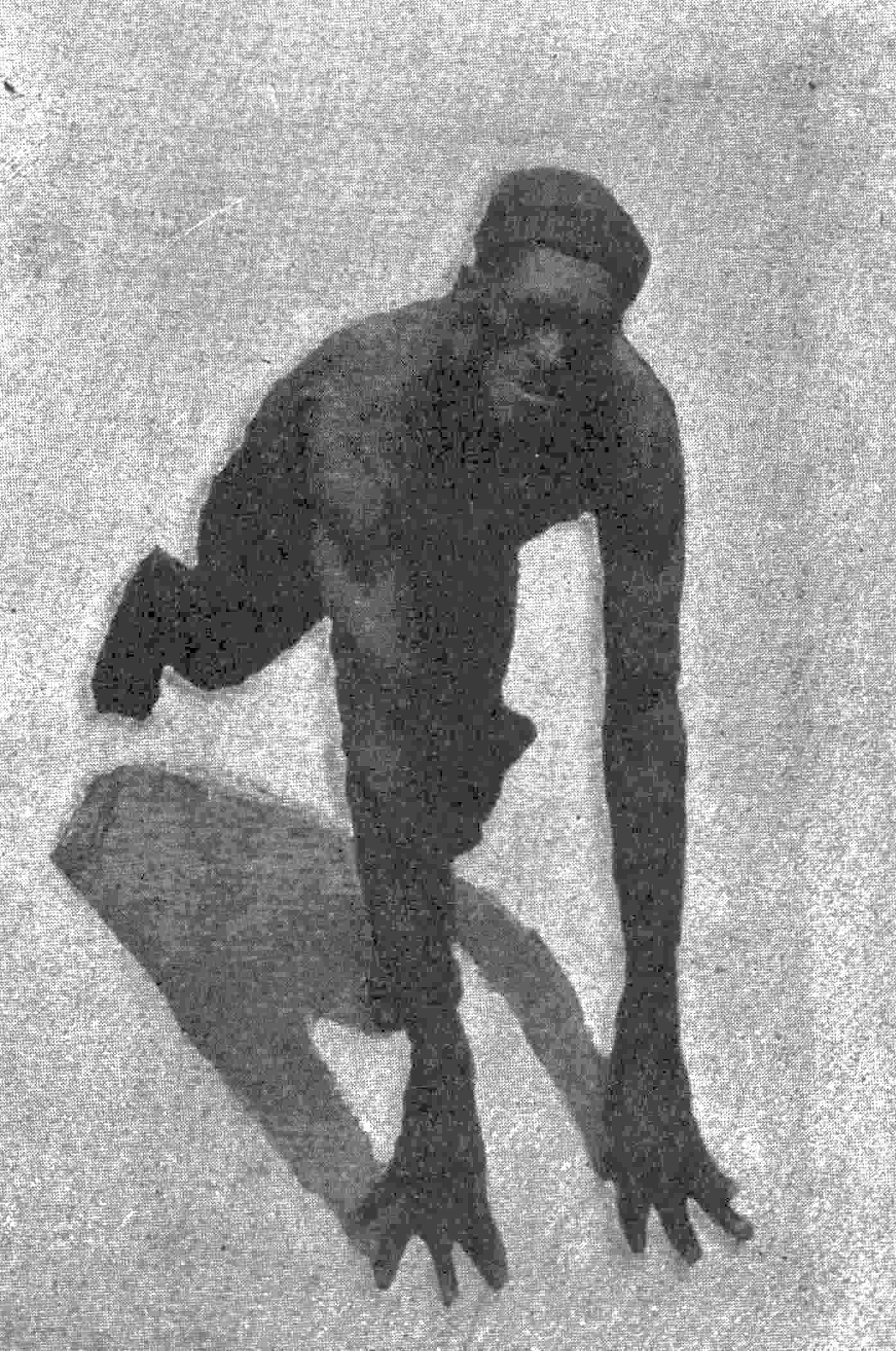
- Ciríaco in 1909
- Born: Francisco da Silva Ciríaco; 1871; Campos dos Goytacazes, Brazil
- Died: May 18, 1912 (aged 40–41); Rio de Janeiro, Brazil
- Occupation: Teacher of capoeira

Francisco da Silva Ciríaco (1871 – May 18, 1912), best known as Ciríaco, Cyriaco or Macaco Velho, was a Brazilian master of capoeira. He became famous for defeating Japanese jujutsu practitioner Sada Miyako.

== Biography ==
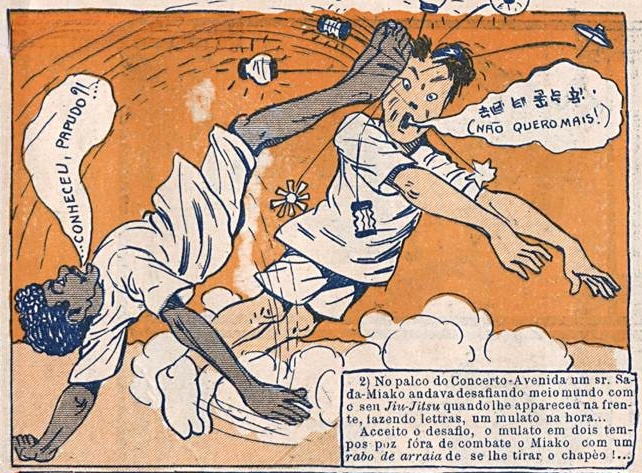
Panel by Alfredo Storni featuring Ciríaco defeating Miyako, O Malho, 1909.

He engaged in an the famous vale tudo fight between himself and Sada Miyako, a hand to hand instructor of the Brazilian navy. This fight was in 1909, in the Pavilhão Internacional Paschoal Segreto, and was witnessed by Agenor Moreira Sampaio. This match was a demonstration of the early rivalry between capoeira and jujutsu. It was as a result of this loss that jujutsu faced a steep decline in Brazil.

Miyako had previously defeated several opponents, among them capoeristas, fueling the rivalry. It is claimed that during the bout, Ciríaco spat on Miyako's face to confuse him, after which he feinted a hand strike, forcing Miyako to cover, only for Ciríaco to twist to the left a land a rabo de arraia kick, knocking him out. After Miyako got up, Ciríaco invited him to repeat the round, but the stil dazzled Japanese refused, closing the event. Ciríaco was thus awarded with 18,000 reales. According to some sources, the whole attack happened while Miyako was offering Ciríaco a handshake, catching him off guard. The capoerista was carried away triumphantly by medical students among the crowd.

He became a national hero after the fight, especially after an interview in the Kosmos magazine. He was even asked to demonstrate his capoeira moves in public events in the Faculdade de Medicina do Rio de Janeiro. His match also reinvigorated discussion about the need to formalize and teach capoeira in Brazil. Artist Raul Pederneiras claimed he was preparing a joint project with Ciríaco to turn capoeira into a sport, defining a ruleset and forbidding lethal strikes. The idea, however, did not advance. Ciríaco died of uremia on May 18, 1912.

== Legacy ==
His legacy includes a popular capoeira song saying:

"O meu amigo Ciriaco
Se acaso fosse estrangeiro
Naturalemente seria
Conhecido no mundo inteiro"

== Bibliography ==
- Lacé Lopes, André Luiz (2015). A capoeiragem no Rio de Janeiro, primeiro ensaio : Sinhozinho e Rudolf Hermanny. Editorial Europa. ISBN 978-85-900795-2-1.
- Silva, Elton; Correa, Eduardo (2020). Muito antes do MMA: O legado dos precursores do Vale Tudo no Brasil e no mundo. ISBN 979-8615504471.
