= Jion (monk) =

Japanese Buddhist monk

Jion (1351–1409 (his birth and death dates are disputed)) was a Zen Buddhism monk and swordsman during the Nanboku-chō period (14th century) of Japan. His full name was Nenami Okuyama Jion (he was born Sōma Shiro Yoshimoto, but adopted the Buddhist name Jion later in life). He was the son of Tadashige, a veteran retainer of Yoshisada Nitta who was killed when he was five years old. It is said that he practiced sword fighting in order to avenge his father, which he did later on in his career which was spent mostly in poverty.

Jion was the founder of the Nen ryu fighting style, famous for the simple saying "Strike with the left arm extended". During Jion's life, he trained fourteen disciples. Tsutsumi Hozan his 12th, was trained with the jitte fighting style and is said to have ripped off another disciples' jaw. Jion was strict about who would be the sharer of his teachings. Jion devised a system in which only one disciple could share the knowledge per fief. This was to make sure that Jion's influence would spread widely. Jion's fourteen disciples shared his teachings to fourteen different regions. Due to this, many famous swordsmen such as Kamiizumi Nobutsuna and Yagyu Muneyoshi learned Jion's teachings.

He also founded and built Chofuku-ji Temple in Namiai-mura, Shinshu Province under the name Nendaiosho at some time during his career. He is a character in the PlayStation 2 video game KENGO: Master of Bushido.
