= Queixada =

Technique used in capoeira

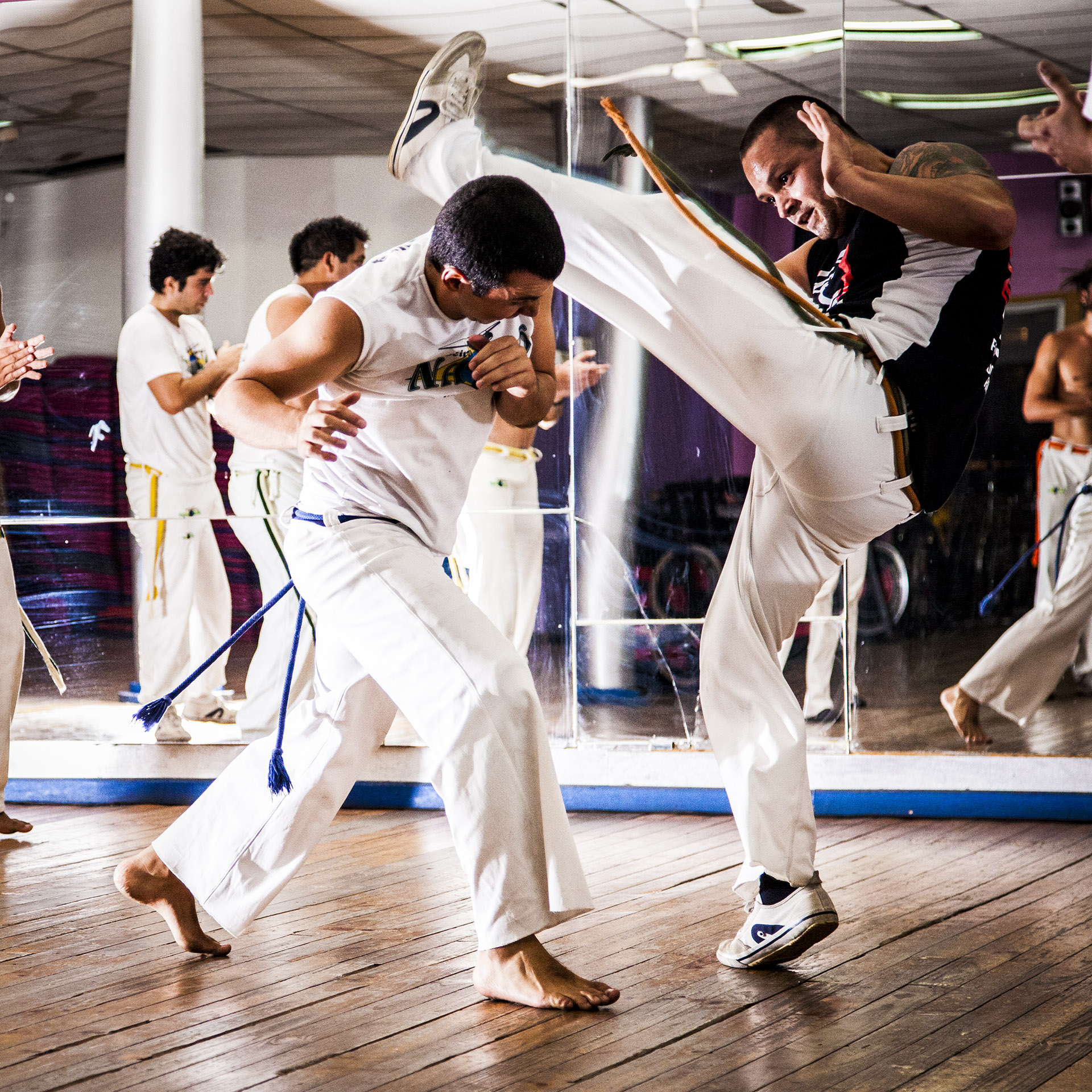
- Queixada kick in capoeira game
- Name: Queixada
- Meaning: jaw
- AKA: meia lua virada
- Type: kick
- Parent style: capoeira carioca capoeira regional
- Parent technique: meia lua de frente
- Child technique(s): with the back leg kicking; with the front leg kicking; ground version
- Escapes: esquiva, negativa
- Counters: rasteira

Queixada (jaw or chin strike) is a crescent kick in capoeira, like the inverse of a meia lua de frente.

This kick targets the side of the opponent's head or the opponent's chin (queixo in Portuguese).

Queixada is one of the most common kicks in regional capoeira. Capoeira Angola players rarely use queixada.

== History ==
In 1928, Anibal Burlamaqui claimed in his book that he introduced the queixada, with the front leg kicking, to capoeira.

In the 1930s, Mestre Bimba introduced the queixada, with the back leg kicking, to regional capoeira, likely from Asian martial arts.

Mestre Pastinha referred to queixada as meia lua virada (turned meia lua).

== Application ==
Queixada with back leg kicking is a fast and tricky kick. It starts by swinging across the body, then comes back around. This can confuse the opponent and make them dodge in the wrong direction. This makes it a good kick to set the opponent up for another kick. Queixada can also be used to start a series of kicks that are linked together without stopping.

Queixada with front leg kicking can be used to move forward to opponent.

== Variations ==
Queixada can be done in two ways:

- with the back leg kicking
- with the front leg kicking

=== With the back leg kicking ===
In Bimba's version, queixada is a circular kick, where the player lifts his or her leg from the inside to the outside in a circular motion and hits someone's chin with the outer side of the foot. Bimba noted that "it's essentially a strike with the outer side of the foot."

This kick is similar to outward crescent kick in other martial arts.

=== With the front leg kicking ===
Queixada animation

In Burlamaqui's version, the capoeirista takes a step in front of the opponent and, after calculating the distance, quickly raises one leg, causing the foot to strike the opponent's jaw.

== Literature ==
- Burlamaqui, Anibal (1928). Gymnástica nacional (capoeiragem), methodisada e regrada. Rio de Janeiro.
- Assunção, Matthias Röhrig (2002). Capoeira: The History of an Afro-Brazilian Martial Art. Routledge. ISBN 978-0-7146-8086-6.
- Capoeira, Nestor (2007). The Little Capoeira Book. Blue Snake Books. ISBN 9781583941980.
- Taylor, Gerard (2012). Capoeira 100: An Illustrated Guide to the Essential Movements and Techniques. Blue Snake Books. ISBN 9781583941768.

== See also ==
- Meia lua de frente
- List of capoeira techniques
