= Armada (capoeira) =

Meia lua de costas
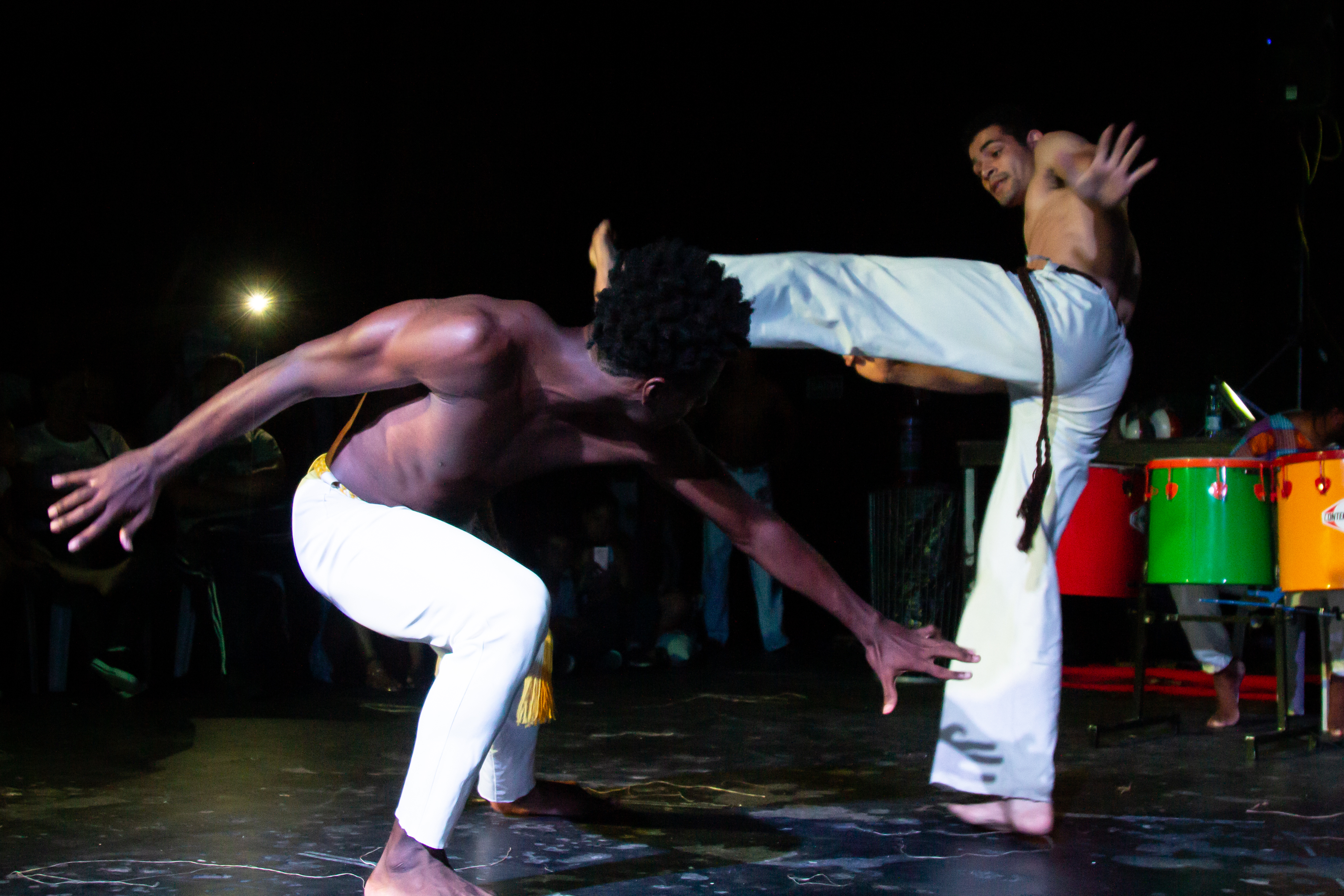
- Armada kick in capoeira game
- Name: Meia lua de costas
- Meaning: back crescent
- AKA: Armada
- Type: kick
- Parent style: capoeira Angola
- Parent technique: meia lua de frente
- Child technique(s): armada pulada; armada dupla or envergado; armada com martelo
- Escapes: esquiva, negativa
- Counters: rasteira

Armada (armed) or meia lua de costas (back crescent) is a back crescent kick in capoeira. It is a very quick 360° spin kick delivered with the outside edge of the kicking foot.

Meia lua de costas is a traditional kick of capoeira Angola and one of the basic capoeira kicks.

This kick may pose a learning curve for beginners.

== Technique ==
According to Nestor Capoeira, to perform the kick, the capoeirista:

- positions one foot forward;
- turns their head and torso until they face the target (after a 180-degree spin);
- rotate their feet in the same direction;
- execute the kick;

When doing the kick correctly, it's akin to the torso acting as a spring, propelling the leg into motion. A common error is not fully turning the head, shoulders, and hips before the kick. This can cause to kick backward, away from the target, or to kick with heel instead of the outside edge of the foot.

Many capoeira players step forward or backward just before the kick.

== Application ==
According to Da Costa, the armada is the best example of a feigned strike. The capoeirista, facing the opponent, turns their back, but instead of stopping, continues the movement by launching their extended leg over the enemy, catching them by surprise.

Also, capoeiristas often execute armada as a follow-up to a kick. They quickly kick laterally in the air, away from the opponent. The opponent advances, taking advantage of the apparent mistake. The capoeirista continues the kick, spinning their body and bringing the attacking leg to the ground, where it becomes the base for the other leg, which will then execute the armada, catching the surprised and in-motion enemy with the help of momentum.

== Variations ==
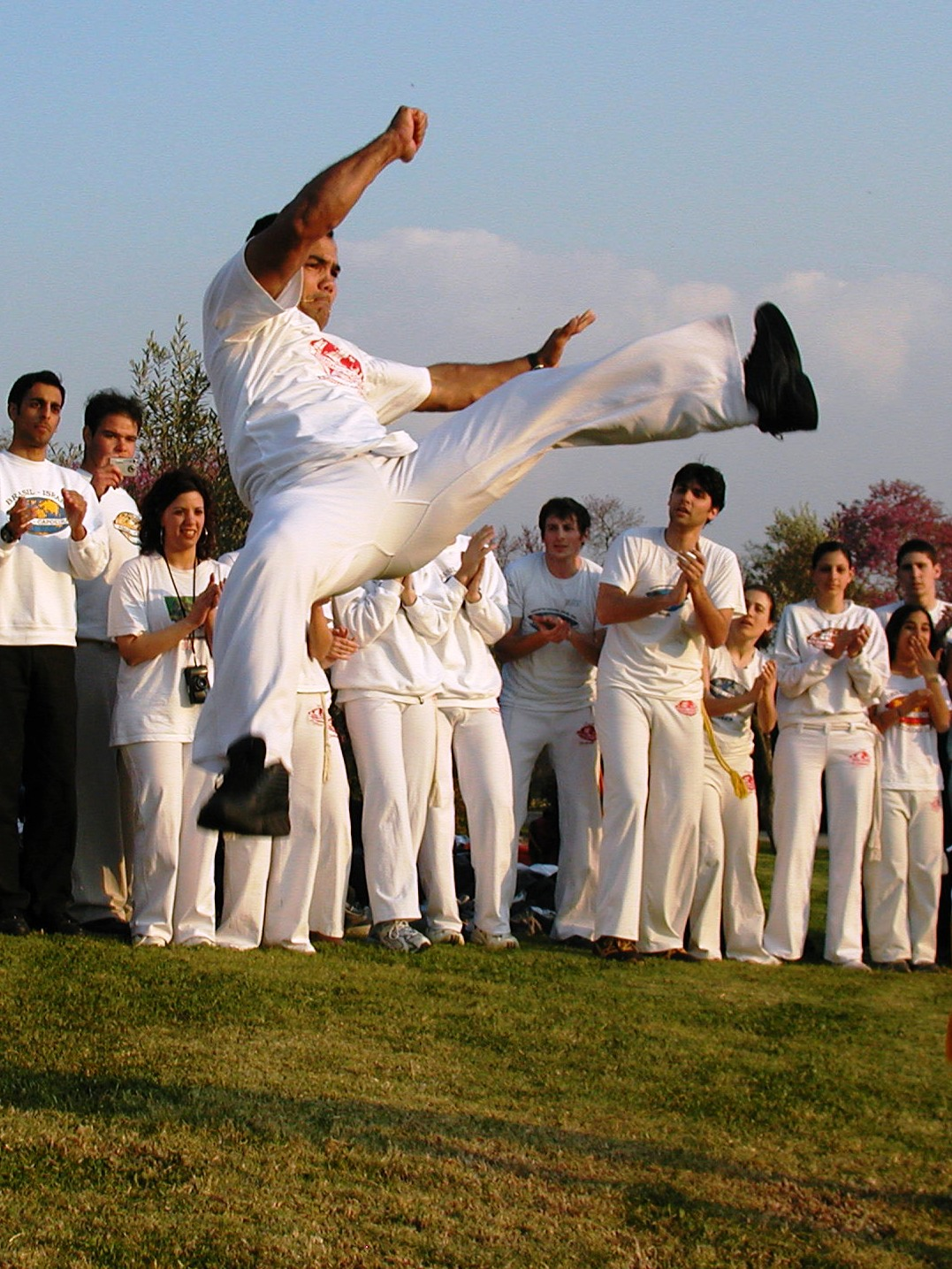
Jumping armada (armada pulada)

Experienced capoeiristas often perform the armada differently, occasionally leading to dire consequences for their opponents. The variations of armada include:

- armada pulada (jumping armada)
- armada dupla (double armada) or envergado
- armada com martelo (armada with hammer kick)

=== Jumping armada with hook kick ===
In this variation, as the attacking leg from the introductory kick reaches the ground, the capoeirista jumps upward before the body begins to rotate due to the push-off. In mid-air, the opposite leg to the kicking one is raised. When the body, still in the air, reaches a position facing the opponent, the heel or the ball of the foot strikes the opponent's head. In this action, practically all the weight of the capoeirista's body is launched at the target. This variation is a very dangerous and can cause serious injury such as skull fracture.

== Literature ==
- Da Costa, Lamartine Pereira (1961). Capoeiragem, a arte da defesa pessoal brasileira. Rio de Janeiro: Oficial da Marinha.
- Sete, Bota (1997). A Capoeira Angola na Bahia. Pallas. ISBN 9788534701266.
- Capoeira, Nestor (2007). The Little Capoeira Book. Blue Snake Books. ISBN 9781583941980.
- Taylor, Gerard (2012). Capoeira 100: An Illustrated Guide to the Essential Movements and Techniques. Blue Snake Books. ISBN 9781583941768.

== See also ==
- Meia lua de frente
- List of capoeira techniques
