= Martelo =

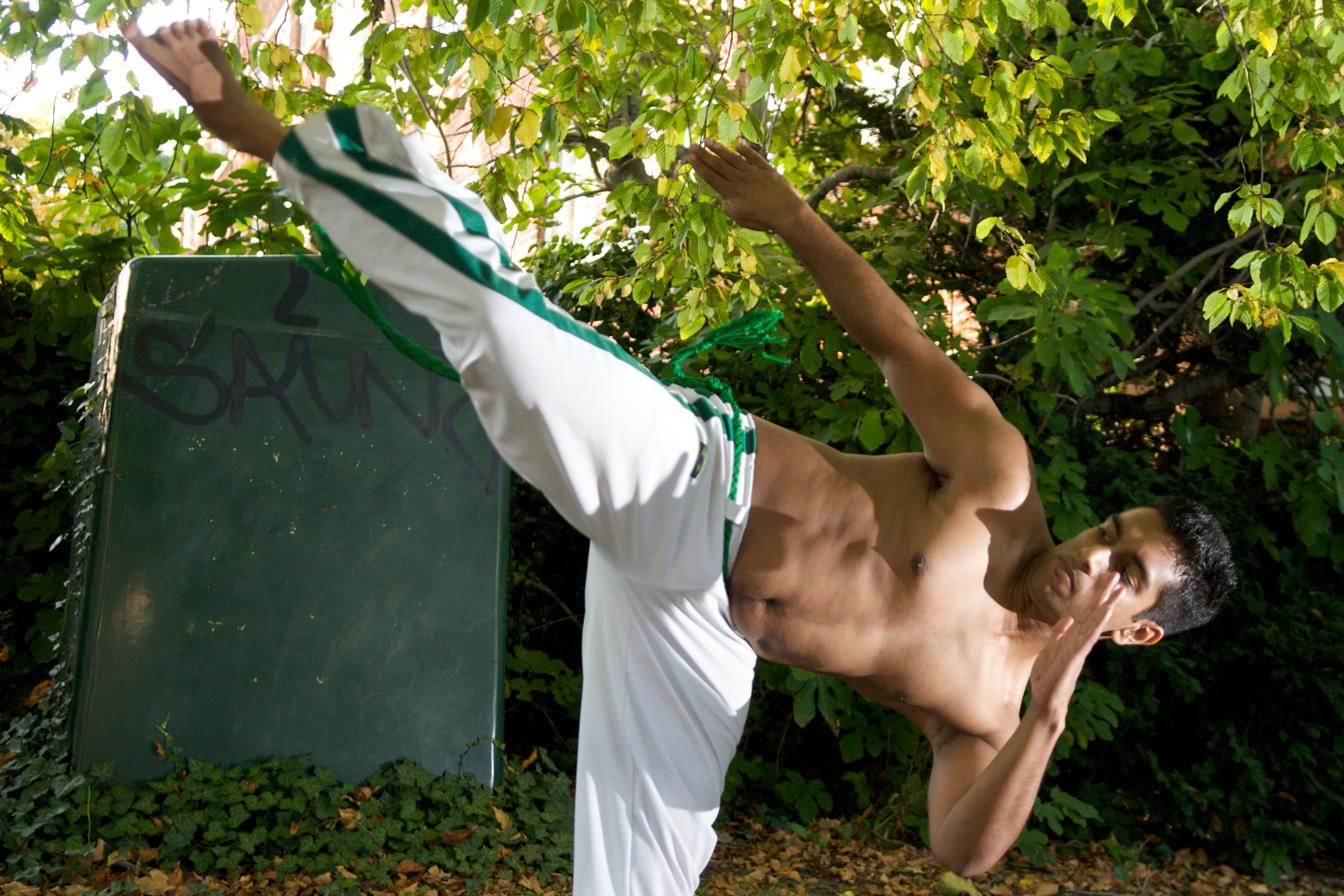
- Martelo kick in capoeira
- Name: Martelo
- Meaning: hammer
- Type: kick
- Parent style: capoeira Regional
- Parent technique: mawashi geri
- Child technique(s): martelo em pé; martelo do chão; chapéu de couro; martelo rodado; armada com martelo
- Escapes: esquiva, negativa
- Counters: rasteira

Martelo (hammer) is the name for roundhouse kick in capoeira. The kick targets the head of the opponent with the top of the foot.

Martelo was not used in traditional capoeira Angola. The kick was introduced to regional capoeira in the 1930s by mestre Bimba, likely from Asian martial arts.

There are several variations of martelo kick, and it is often combined with other techniques.

== Variations ==
=== Martelo em pé (standing hammer) ===
Martelo em pé (standing hammer) or just martelo is a fast and powerful kick, traditionally performed with the top of the foot. The arms are important in the martelo, helping to generate power and momentum, and to preserve balance. After the kick, the kicking leg swiftly returns under control.

The kick is usually delivered from the back leg in ginga.

To execute the hammer kick, one adjusts the supporting foot's angle for alignment, raises the knee in front of the body, turn sideways and forcefully extends the leg to kick with the top of the foot.

=== Martelo do chão (ground hammer) ===
Martelo do chão (left)

Martelo do chão starts from the negativa position. In this position, the hand opposite to the supporting one moves towards the extended leg. The hip lifts, and the previously bent leg kicks the opponent.

This kick is commonly used as an offensive move from the ground against a standing opponent. It is more common in capoeira Angola.

=== Chapéu de couro (leather hat) ===
Chapéu de couro (leather hat), also known as S-dobrado (double-S), is a complex move that starts on the floor and springs towards the opponent, in a slicing motion through the air, with each leg following the same path. This kick can be used to surprise the opponent by leaping at them directly from a grounded position.

The player starts in a negative position, then executes a powerful hop from their leading foot, swinging the other leg upward and forward across their body while keeping one hand on the floor. To gain momentum, the player should coordinate their legs, torso, free hand, and head in the same direction as the kick. In the kicking phase of the movement, the player does not reach back with the free hand to place it on the ground as they would in S-dobrado. Instead, they complete the kick with their free hand remaining off the ground and land on their kicking foot.

According to Da Costa, S-dobrado follows a fake sweep. The capoeirista initiates a strong rasteira in front of the opponent, without making contact, supporting themselves with one leg and the arm on the same side. The opposite arm, on the side of the extended leg, rises for balance. When the sweeping leg approaches the supporting leg, the raised hand touches the ground. Aided by the momentum generated by the sweep, the supporting leg extends, lifting off the ground and delivering a powerful kick to the opponent.

== Literature ==
- Da Costa, Lamartine Pereira (1961). Capoeiragem, a arte da defesa pessoal brasileira. Rio de Janeiro: Oficial da Marinha.
- Assunção, Matthias Röhrig (2002). Capoeira: The History of an Afro-Brazilian Martial Art. Routledge. ISBN 978-0-7146-8086-6.
- Capoeira, Nestor (2007). The Little Capoeira Book. Blue Snake Books. ISBN 9781583941980.
- Taylor, Gerard (2012). Capoeira 100: An Illustrated Guide to the Essential Movements and Techniques. Blue Snake Books. ISBN 9781583941768.

== See also ==
- List of capoeira techniques
