= Meia lua de frente =

Capoeira kick

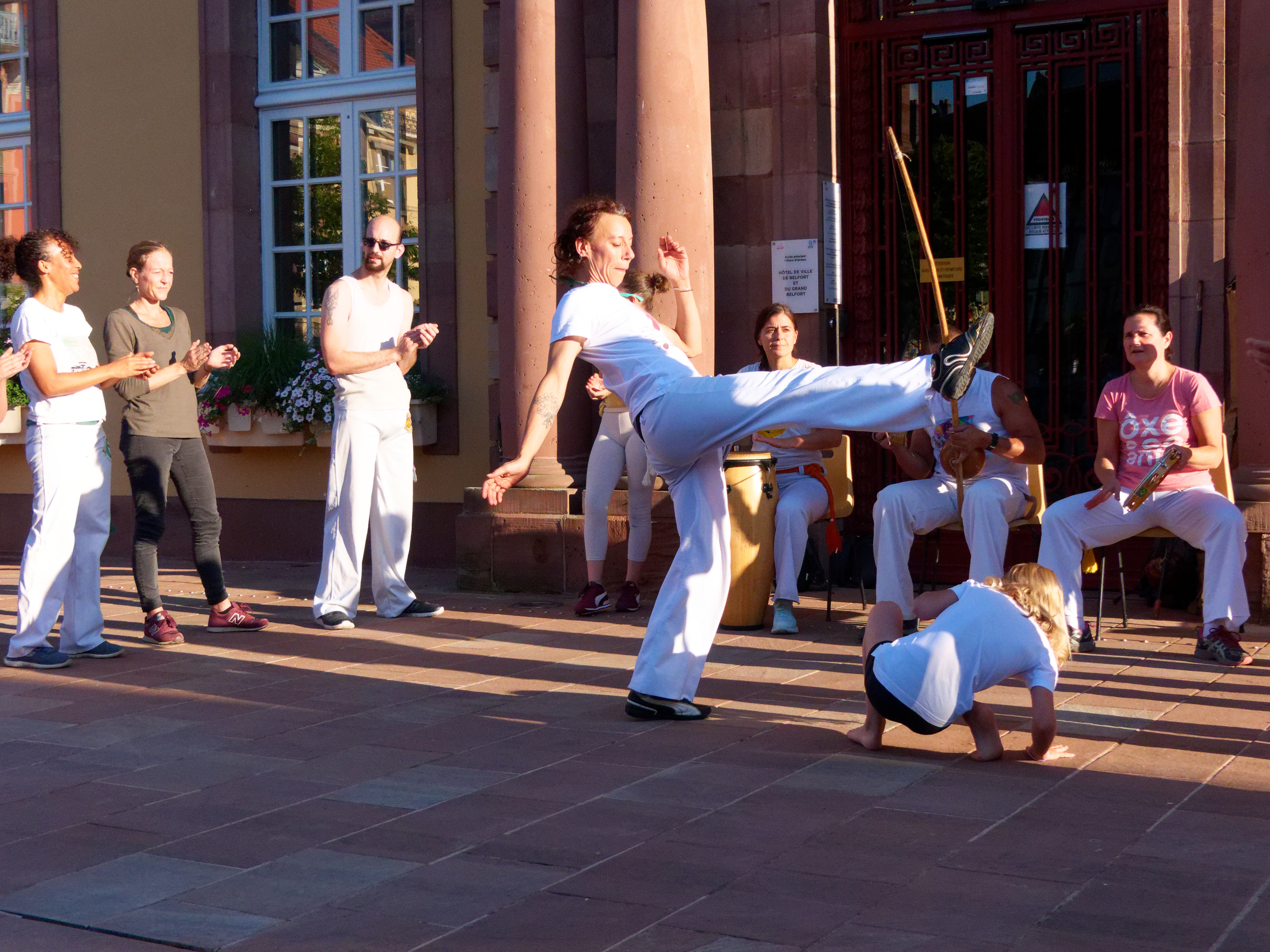
- Meia lua de frente in capoeira game
- Name: Meia lua de frente
- Meaning: front crescent
- AKA: meia lua
- Type: kick
- Parent style: capoeira Angola
- Parent technique: engolo okupayeka kick
- Child technique(s): armada, queixada
- Escapes: esquiva, negativa
- Counters: rabo de arraia, rasteira

Meia lua (crescent) or Meia lua de frente (front crescent) is one of the few principal kicks in capoeira. The kicking leg moves in the form of an arc before returning to its original position.

Meia lua is considered one of the first capoeira kicks to learn. It is the foundation for others crescent kicks in capoeira, such as armada or meia-lua de costas (back crescent) or queixada, which is like the inverse of a meia lua de frente.

Front crescent (or outside crescent) kick is seen in various martial arts. Meia lua is widely used in African martial art engolo, the forerunner of capoeira.

== Name ==
The meia lua (crescent) gets its name from the semicircle motion the leg performs when the player executes it.

== Origin ==
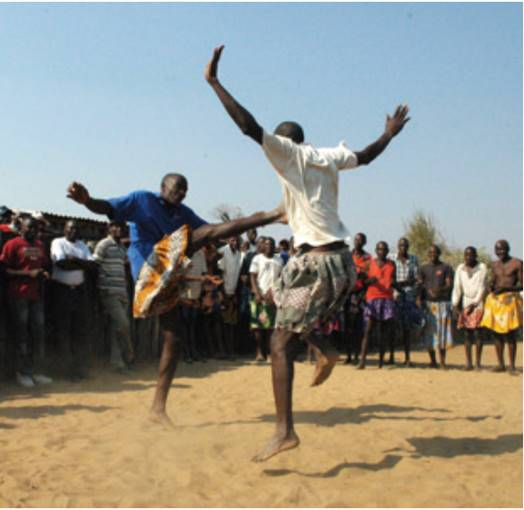
Front crescent kick in engolo.

Front crescent kick (okupayeka) is one of the basic kicks in engolo, an Angolan martial art considered the ancestor of capoeira. There are numerous variations of the crescent kick in engolo:

- front crescent kick (meia lua de frente)
  - high front crescent
  - medium front crescent
  - jumping front crescent
- reversed front crescent (queixada)
- back crescent kick (armada)

In engolo, the kicking leg can be extended fully or partially bent (which is considered incorrect in capoeira).

According to Desch-Obi, some engolo kicks was likely developed by Bantu shamans in Angola. Among the Pende shamans, the most important movement was the front crescent kick, the same as in engolo. During the ritual, masked shaman kicked over sacred medicine to activate it and over the kneeling people to heal them.

== Technique ==
When doing crescent kick in capoeira, the kicking leg is straight and the hips are pushed forward. This kick uses the hips to generate force and to propel the leg forward. The technique is similar to extending the leg over a chair.

Meia lua usually aims to bring the foot of the kicking leg across the opponent's face. Depending on the opponent's position, this kick can be delivered to various regions of the body, often to the opponent's face height. The kick should be finished when it reaches a point directly in front of the kicker.

While it can be used as an attack itself, it is also used as a poke or trap for another attack. Meia lua is a good kick to feel out the opponent’s style. Because it is usually low and frontal it doesn’t open the player to sweeps or counterattacks.

Other uses for meia lua can be as a combination with cartwheels and other acrobatic moves, working as an escape.

== Defenses ==
Defense can be applied in various ways, usually by moving away and quickly lowering the body. From that position it is possible to deliver a rabo de arraia to the attacker by swiftly rotating the body, or even use chapa de costas.

The defender could also move away and, quickly descending, tried to take down the attacker with a sweep (rasteira).

== See also ==
- Capoeira
- List of capoeira techniques

== Literature ==
- Pastinha, Mestre (1988). Capoeira Angola. Fundação Cultural do Estado da Bahia.
- Assunção, Matthias Röhrig (2002). Capoeira: The History of an Afro-Brazilian Martial Art. Routledge. ISBN 978-0-7146-8086-6.
- Capoeira, Nestor (2007). The Little Capoeira Book. Blue Snake Books. ISBN 9781583941980.
- Desch-Obi, M. Thomas J. (2008). Fighting for Honor: The History of African Martial Art Traditions in the Atlantic World. Columbia: University of South Carolina Press. ISBN 978-1-57003-718-4.
- Taylor, Gerard (2012). Capoeira 100: An Illustrated Guide to the Essential Movements and Techniques. Blue Snake Books. ISBN 9781583941768.
