= Knifehand strike =

"Karate chop" strike in martial arts

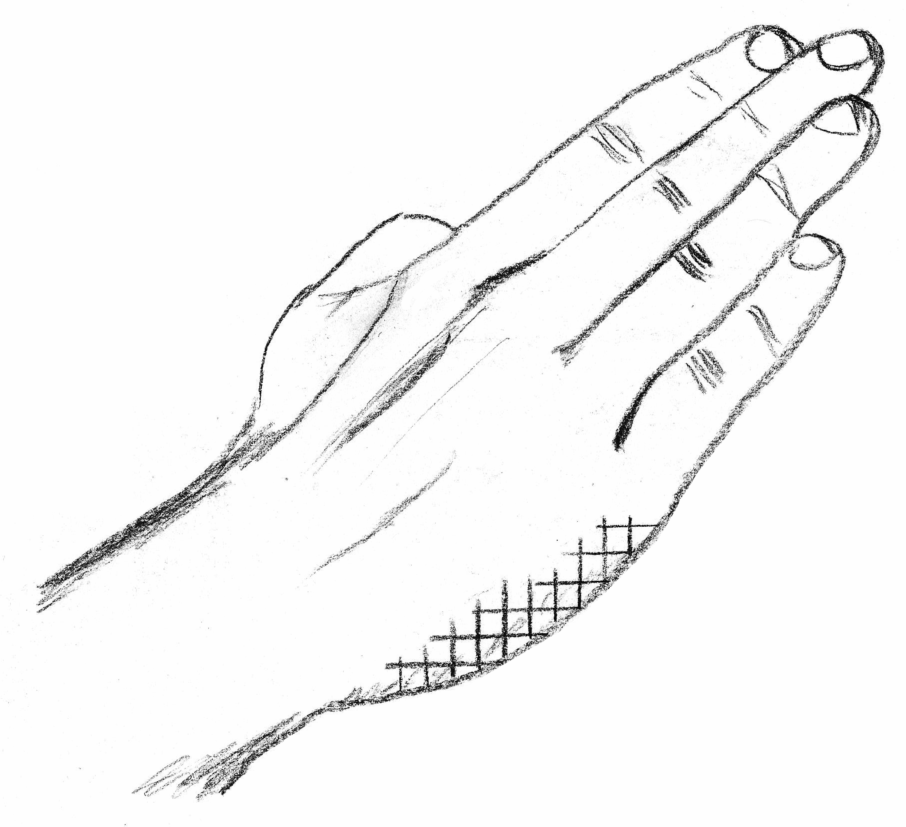

Chinese name
- Chinese: 手刀
Transcriptions
Standard Mandarin
- Hanyu Pinyin: Shǒudāo
- Wade–Giles: Shou^{3}-tao^{1}
- IPA: [ʂòʊtáʊ]

Korean name
- Hangul: 손날 목 치기
Transcriptions
- Revised Romanization: sonnal mok chigi
- McCune–Reischauer: sonnal mok ch'igi

Japanese name
- Kanji: 手刀打ち
- Hiragana: しゅとううち
Transcriptions
- Revised Hepburn: shutō-uchi
- Kunrei-shiki: syutô-uti

In martial arts, a knifehand strike is a strike using the part of the hand opposite the thumb (from the little finger to the wrist), familiar to many people as a karate chop (in Japanese, shutō-uchi). Suitable targets for the knifehand strike include the carotid sinus at the base of the neck (which can cause unconsciousness), mastoid muscles of the neck, the jugular, the throat, the collar bones, ribs, sides of the head, temple, jaw, the third vertebra (key stone of the spinal column), the upper arm, the wrist (knifehand block), the elbow (outside knifehand block), and the knee cap (leg throw).

In many Japanese, Korean, and Chinese styles, the knifehand is used to block as well as to strike.

== Japanese martial arts ==
Tegatana (手刀 : てがたな; Japanese for hand-sword) is a term from Japanese martial arts like aikido and Chinese-Okinawan martial arts like karate and Shorinji Kempo referring to a hand position that resembles that of the blade of a sword. This can be in a high, middle or low position but is usually extended outwards at about eye level (towards the carotid artery and carotid sinus which leads to unconsciousness– a key strike point).

During practice, uke and tori will often stand opposite each other with their respective tegatana touching each other. From this position, considered by some the ideal combative distance for two unarmed opponents, many balance-breaking, striking and throwing techniques can be applied. In karate, the handsword collarbone chop (tegatana-sakotsu-uchi), the handsword collarbone strike (tegatana-sakotsu-uchikomi) and the handsword face chop (tegatana-ganmen-uchi) all use this fundamental strike as a basis for attack.

The knifehand strike can be used with either side of the hand. Having the thumb tucked in, leaving the fore finger side of the hand free, allows that side of the hand to be used as a striking surface. This is called an inside knifehand where as the pinkie finger side is called an outside knifehand.

== Korean martial arts ==
In taekwondo, a knifehand strike (son-nal mok chigi or sonkal taerigi) is executed by striking with the muscle at the side of the hand located between the base of the small finger and the wrist (abductor digiti minimi). It is used as both an offensive and defensive technique and can be executed as a high, low, middle, side, inward, outward, rising or circular strike. Use of this technique as both a strike and block is featured prominently in many of the WTF Taegeuk poomsae.

== Professional wrestling and mixed martial arts ==
Knifehand chops were successfully used in mixed martial arts by Kazushi Sakuraba. He utilized the kind known in professional wrestling as "Mongolian chop", where he would strike with both hands at the sides of his opponent's neck.

== Fictional depictions ==
The popularity of Asian martial arts in the West in the mid to late 20th century gave rise to an exaggerated version of a knifehand strike widely used in American and British cinema, television, and animated cartoons. In common depictions, a character will deliver a single, precise-looking but relatively weak strike to the side of an opponent's neck, which instantly renders them unconscious but otherwise unharmed. (In some versions, the blow is instantly fatal.) This is frequently done from behind to an unaware adversary, often an enemy guard. The move became a staple of the spy genre in the 1960s and 1970s.

== Bibliography ==
- Mas Oyama, Mas Oyama's Essential Karate, Fourth Publishing, 1980, Sterling Publishing Co., Inc.
