= List of capoeira techniques =

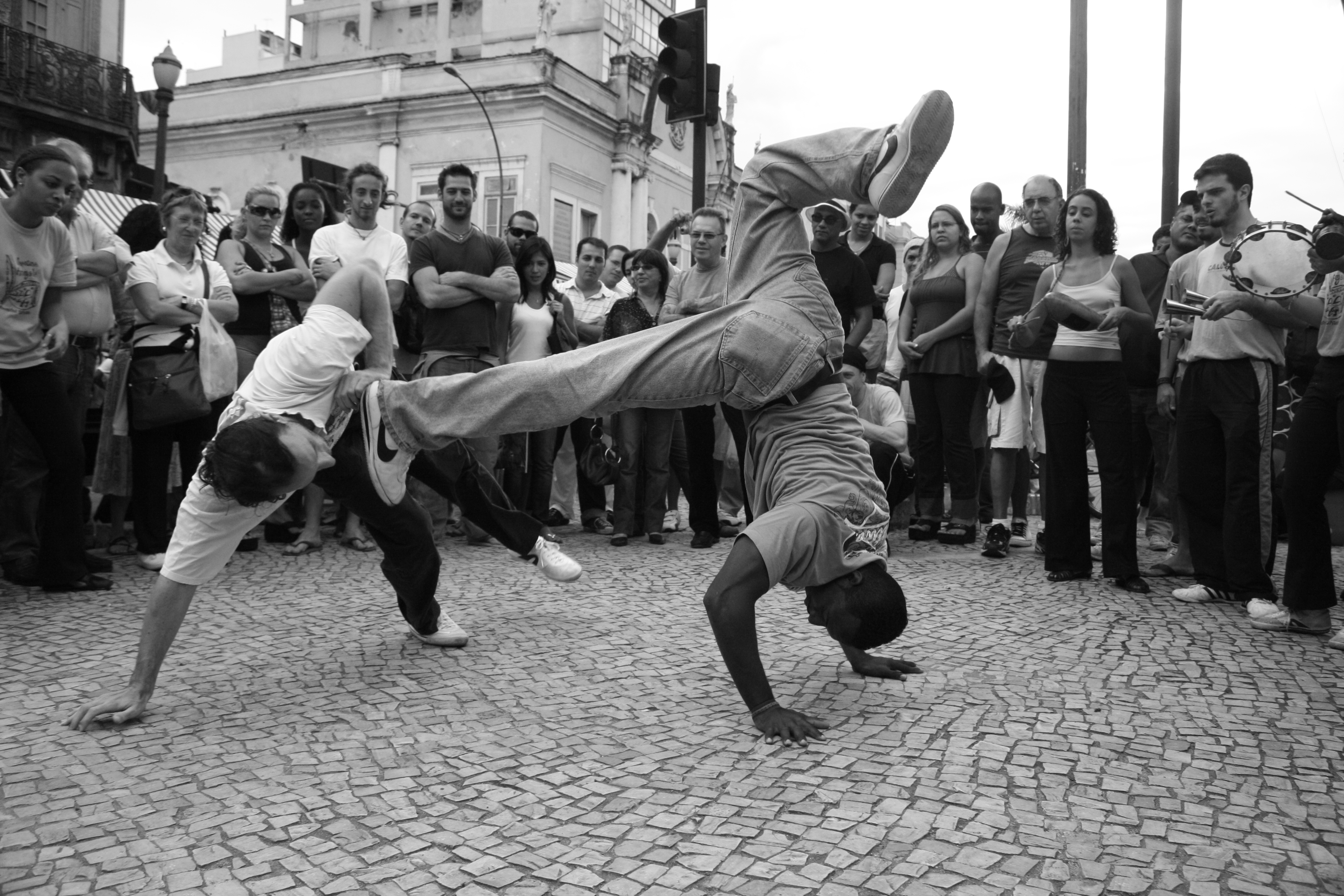
Street capoeira in Rio de Janeiro, 2008.

The list of capoeira techniques includes kicks, headbutts, evasions, acrobatics and more. In capoeira, the main emphasis is normally placed on the interaction between kicks and evasions.

Due to historical reasons, different capoeira groups use different names for the same techniques, or the same name for different techniques.

== Historical development ==
=== Core techniques ===
Mestre Pastinha considered the core techniques of the traditional capoeira to be the following:

- cabeçada (headbutt)
- rasteira (sweep)
- rabo de arraia
- chapa de frente (front push kick)
- chapa de costas (back push kick)
- meia lua (crescent kick)
- cutilada de mão (hand chop)

It is documented that the majority of the core capoeira techniques, including rasteira, rabo de arraia, chapa de frente, chapa de costas, meia lua, and many other distinct techniques such as scorpion kick and L-kick, were originally developed within the Angolan martial art engolo. Beside the engolo core, the sole major technique incorporated in capoeira was headbutting, derived from a common African practice.

Pastinha believes that the original martial art, brought by Africans during colonization, was secretly transmitted without further development because slaves were prohibited from practicing personal defense.

Some authors believe that West African martial arts, such as Hausa Dambe, and Nuba wrestling also influenced capoeira techniques.

=== Carioca street fight techniques ===
In the 19th century capoeira saw a notable shift to weapons such as razors, knives, sticks and rocks. The late 19th century street-fighting capoeiragem was a mixed martial art, combining five main fighting techniques: headbutts, foot kicks, open hand blows, blades, and stick techniques.

The straight razor (navalha) was most common capoeira weapon, also used for assassinations. Blade techniques were a natural extension of unarmed capoeira. According to Jair Moura, whether fighting with or without weapons, the form remained consistent. The razor was seamlessly integrated into the core art by gripping it between the toes, preserving the feet as the primary weapon while adding efficiency with the blade.

Headbutts were the capoeiras' primary technique, as per police records. In one case, when the soldier attempted to arrest Celestino, capoeirista from Salvador, he instead received a headbutt that "caused his death almost instantly". In other case, a police officer in Rio had been murdered with a headbutt, whose upper body "had been flattened as if the implement of death had been a mallet".

Stick were easily added to capoeira, because many Africans with a tradition of stick-fighting already had that skills.

=== Bimba's new techniques ===
After the establishment of academies in the 1930s, weapons were banned and capoeira returned to its original kicking form with occasional headbutts. Capoeira Regional adopted some techniques from Asian martial arts, while capoeira Angola preserved the traditional techniques only.

Mestre Bimba incorporated new techniques into capoeira from the African arts of batuque and maculêlê, as well as from Greco-Roman wrestling, ju-jitsu, judo, and French savate. Those techniques include:

- various punches using one or both hands (godeme, telefone, galopante).
- unbalancing (takedown) techniques involving the arms and upper body to bring down the opponent, and new rasteiras, from batuque.
- the snap kick (ponteira), the reversed crescent kick (queixada) and the roundhouse kick (martelo), likely from Asian martial arts.
- cintura desprezada (despised waist) or balões (balloons), the acrobatic escapes to avoid being grabbed by wrestlers. These movements involve the capoeirista projecting themselves into the air with their head pointing downwards, and then landing softly on their feet.

Regardless, Desch-Obi concludes that after the centuries of evolution, contemporary capoeira remained firmly based on crescent and push kicks, inverted positions, sweeps, and acrobatic evasions inherited from engolo.

== Cartwheels ==
Aú Aberto

Aú is the capoeira term for what is more generally known as a cartwheel. It differs a bit from the traditional cartwheel because of their different intentions. An aú, in its base form, is performed slowly, with arms and legs bent in order to keep a low target profile. Players sometime pause midway during an aú holding it for a handstand position, from which they can execute a wide variety of moves.

There is always the existing risk of receiving a low headbutt, front push kick, or some other attack while inverted. To combat this an emphasis is placed on closely watching the movements and intentions of the other player instead of the ground. While the main purpose of using the aú is more geared towards mobility and evasion there are still more ingenious variations of employing it. Capoeira players can incorporate unpredictable strikes as well as floeiros from the aú. These include inverted kicks as well as jumping movements that do not involve the hand.

=== Open cartwheel (Aú aberto) ===
From esquiva, the free arm reaches in an arc over the head in the direction of motion. The leg extended furthest from the body leaves the ground first, kicking off and providing momentum. Then the reaching hand is placed on the far side of the body. Bending the arms at the elbows supports weight as both legs pass over the body fully extended. While inverted, the body should be opened and entirely extended. One foot touches the ground then the other. The arms must be lifted for protection as soon as they are no longer supporting weight.

=== Closed cartwheel (Aú fechado) ===
Aú Fechado

From esquiva or negativa, the free arm reaches in an arc over the head in the direction of motion. The leg extended furthest from the body leaves the ground first, kicking off and providing momentum. Then the reaching hand is placed on the far side of the body. Bending the arms at the elbows supports weight as both legs pass bent in front of and slightly over the body. While inverted, the body should be closed and maximally protected. One foot touches the ground and then the other. The last step is return to esquiva.

=== Front walkover (Aú de frente) ===
The aú de frente, also known as volta ao mundo or aú cortado, starts much like a regular aú, but once the legs are off the floor, the hips are turned and the move ends in a front walkover.

=== Aerial cartwheel (Aú sem mão) ===
Aú sem mão

An aú performed without hands in the same manner as the aerial cartwheel. It can be inverted more diagonally in order to attack in the same way as a butterfly kick, or be used as a floreio.

=== Aú giro sem mão ===
The aú giro sem mão, also known as pião sem mão, combines the motions of an aú de frente with those of an aerial. The aú giro sem mão starts just like an aú sem mão, but once the player jumps off with their leg, the opposite arm is driven around and towards the chest to create enough torque for the rotation. The advanced variation is the aú sem mão de frente which is literally a front walkover without hands.

== Movement ==
=== Ginga ===
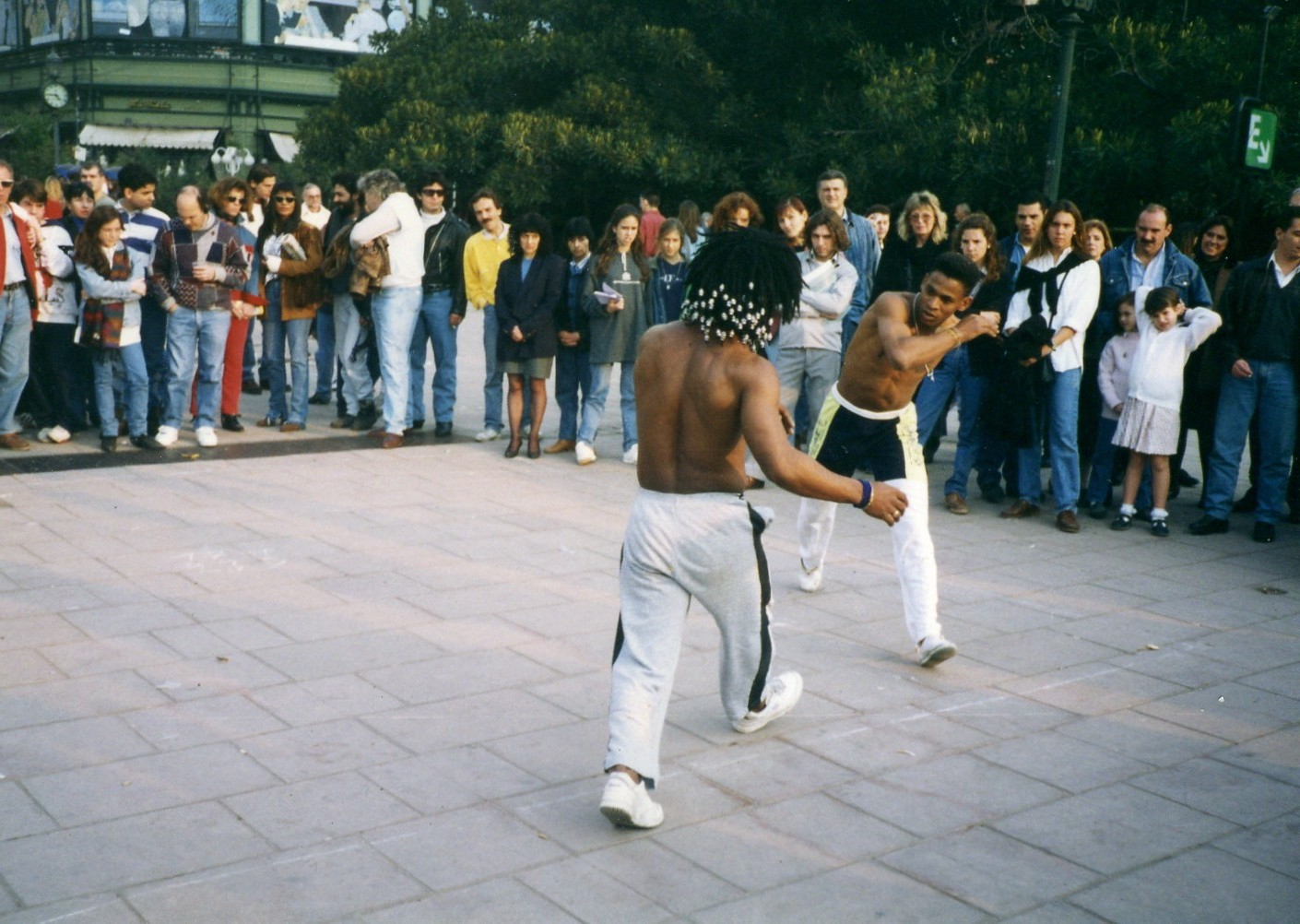
Two capoeira players in ginga

The ginga (pronounced jeen-gah; literally: rocking back and forth; to swing) is the fundamental footwork of capoeira. Its constant triangular footwork makes capoeira easily recognizable as well as confusing, since it looks much more like a rhythmic dance step than an orthodox static fighting stance. Only a few martial arts employ similar rhythmic footwork found in the ginga. South Korea's Taekkyeon and some forms of Pencak Silat are a few others.

The main purpose is not dancing but rather to prepare the body for any number of movements such as evading, feinting, or delivering attacks while continuously shifting stances and thus providing confusion. The ginga places the capoeirista in constant motion, making them a frustrating target for a forward-advancing opponent. The ginga also allows the capoeirista to continuously maintain enough torque to use in a strike while providing a synchronization of arm movement to avoid and slip under attacks. The ginga is not static, so its speed is usually determined by the toque or rhythm dictated by the bateria.

Capoeira Angola and capoeira regional both have distinctive versions of this movement. In Capoeira Angola, the ginga is more expressive and individualistic, while in Capoeira Regional the ginga has a more structured and defensive look. Most Capoeira regional academies teach the ginga in the same way until the student advances to a certain level and begins to develop their own expressive and comfortable way of using it.

=== Balanço ===
The balanço of side to side feints done with the torso to deceive the opponent, throw off their timing, and make it harder for them to track the centerline. In a similar manner as a speedskater, the bodyweight is shifted from one leg to the other in a slight lateral hopping/sliding motion while the arms move in a similar fashion as they do during the ginga. The balanço is usually done from the forward ginga and is also known as the Cavalo. As with other movements in capoeira, all types of kicks, handstrikes, or headbutts can be executed unexpectedly from the movement.

- Pêndulo

The pêndulo resembles more the slipping and bobbing. Whereas the balanço moves side to side, the pendulo is used more to roll and move under attacks. Most of the movement starts from the upper body but also includes dropping with the knees. When the arms are used while the upper body follows the same path as the letter C. The move works really well with incoming fast or direct attacks.

=== Rolê ===
Rolê: This 'rolling' motion is - together with the Ginga and the Au - the basic method of moving around in the Roda. This move can be performed from Ginga or from most of the esquivas. It is essentially a spin to one side by the capoeirista while remaining low to the ground and always watching the other player. One of the hallmarks of the move is that during the part where the back is facing the opponent, eye contact is maintained via looking between the legs to watch for an attack. The rolê can end easily in roxana, Negativa, or various esquivas. The Rolê de Cabeça variation is performed by placing the head on the ground in the middle of the rolê so as to be able to transition into various headstand techniques.

=== Negativa ===
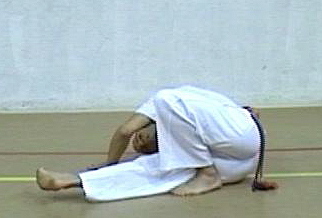
Negativa da Regional

lit. negative, refusal or deny. a negativa is used to negate an attack by going low to the ground on one's side, with the leg closest to the ground tucked to the chest, the other extended, supporting one's body weight with the hand, with the upper arm in a location to protect the face. The negativa derrubando used as a sweep which involves hooking the other players supporting leg during a kick.

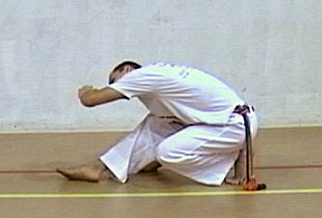
Negativa

=== Troca de Pé ===
Literally Change of Foot, From a Negativa position with the leg extended, a slight hop during which the extended leg becomes the support leg and the guard arm becomes the support arm and vice versa.

=== Ponte ===
The ponte is a bridge with the stomach facing upward and the hands and feet pushing to keep the back arched and off the floor. Most learn to roll into a ponte by turning their legs and hips around first and then inverting into a bridge. The capoeirista can then roll out into a cocorinha, queda de rins, or resistincia for a stylish entrance into a roda. The ponte also doubles as a last resort esquiva although that depends on the player's skill level, style, and speed of the game. Another interesting fact is that Mestre Bimba would give a potential student (aluno) a series of tests before actually teaching them at his academy. One of the tests was a measure of the applicant's natural ability to hold a bridge

== Evasions ==
=== Cocorinha ===
One of the simplest defense movements. With the feet flat on the ground the player squats with the knees to the chest so as to close the body and covers the side of the torso and head with one hand while the other is flat and to the side for support.

Another variation of this involves squatting with the balls of the feet on the ground and arms crossed in front and above the face.

=== Esquiva ===
Esquiva (literally escape or dodge) is a very intuitive way of dodging a horizontal blow, which consists of simply taking the head and torso out of the trajectory of attack. Many variations exist but all involve moving the head and torso out of the way of an attack. Esquivas distinguish capoeira from many other martial arts for the simple fact of going along with flow of the attack and releasing an equal or more devastating attack. Many of the attacks in capoeira are fully committed kicks that would cause more injury blocking them instead of dodging them. Blocking attacks upset and imbalance the flow of the game making esquivas more common in rodas. Many esquivas also include an arm in a cross block position as a second line of defense against an attack. A block should only be used when the esquiva is completely non-viable. Blocks do sometimes occur when one player is so caught off guard that they are used instinctively. The most common situations being against hand attacks.

=== Esquiva Baixa ===
Also known as Esquiva de Frente."Low dodge", this has the looks of an extremely low ginga. The rear leg and foot are exaggerated and placed even farther back to bring the hips lower to the ground. The torso is bent forward bringing the head even lower. If the left foot is back then the right hand is placed on the floor; the left hand is used to guard the face and head.

=== Esquiva Lateral ===
"Side escape" or side dodge. It is executed while the feet are in a parallel position. The escape is simply bringing the torso down and to the left or right (depending on the direction of the other player's kick) and reaching the hand over the head The hand can also be placed in front of the face for protection. Some academies will place the hand that is not guarding onto the floor to get even lower.

=== Esquiva Diagonal ===
This is a dodge that simultaneously dodges and advances forward. Instead of going straight down under an attack or off to the side like in the esquiva lateral or esquiva de frente, the capoeirista steps diagonally of to the left or right of the attack. He/she places his front foot in a perpendicular position to his back foot and crouches down at the knees in a low lunge. The left or right arm comes up to protect the face depending on the direction of the attack while the other arm maintains the body's balance. This is a quite useful esquiva because many counterattacks are available to the player from this position which can include martelos, ganchos, or vingativas saving valuable time.

=== Paralelo ===
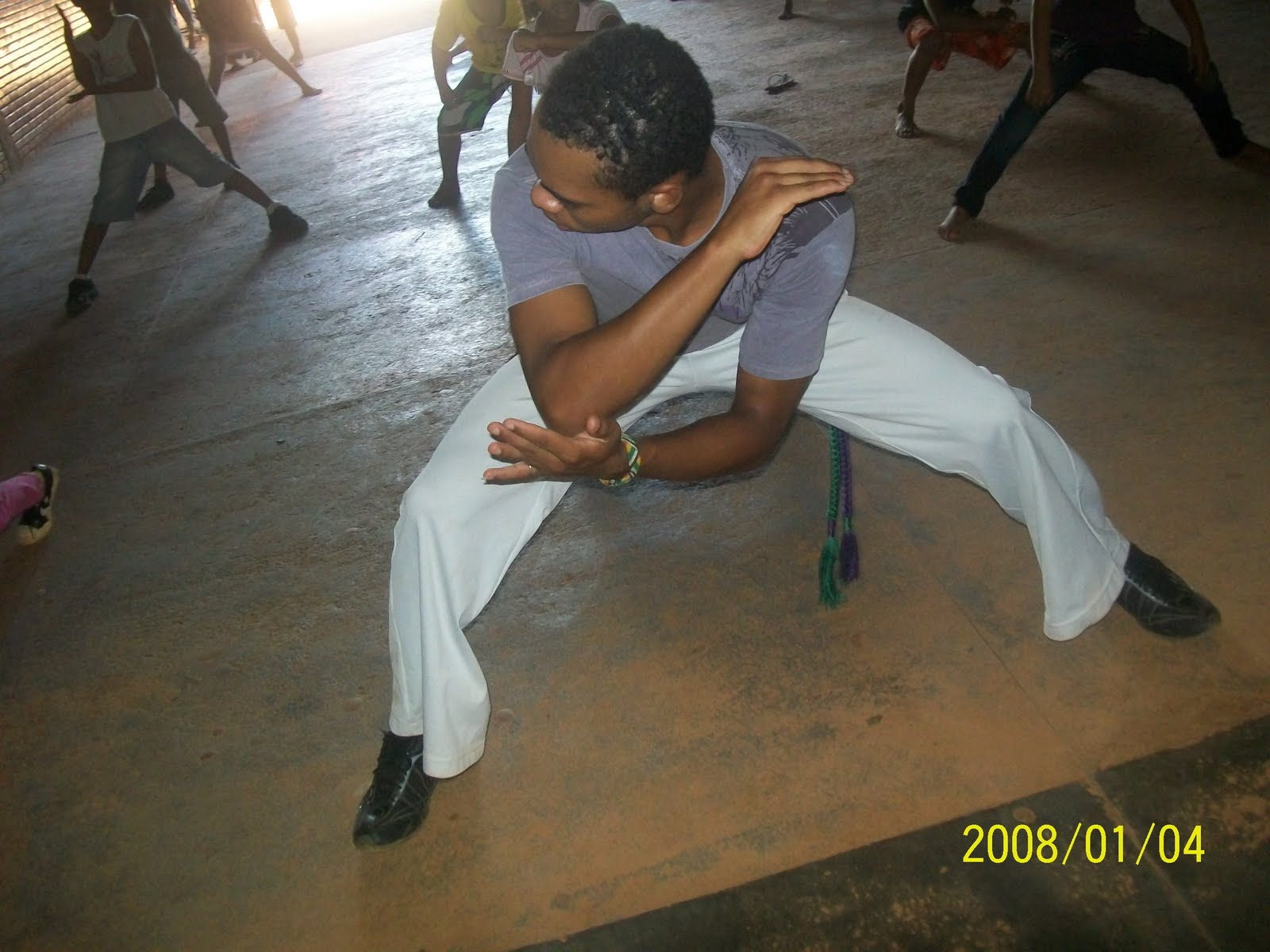
Paralelo

The cadeira or paralelo is a low squat that shares many similarities with the horse stance found in Eastern martial arts. One arm protects the face while the other is extended out protecting the torso. Every time a capoeirista brings his feet parallel during a ginga, they enter this position. The Esquiva paralela is done on the side to avoid incoming kicks.

== Falls ==
=== Queda de rins ===
The queda de rins (fall on the kidneys) can be used as an esquiva or a launching point for a technique. It involves supporting the torso with the inside elbow and the head, often with the knees resting on the supporting elbow. The head is usually the lowest with the feet and at the highest in a rough 45° angle. The legs themselves may be together, tuck, split depending on the position.

=== Queda de quatro ===
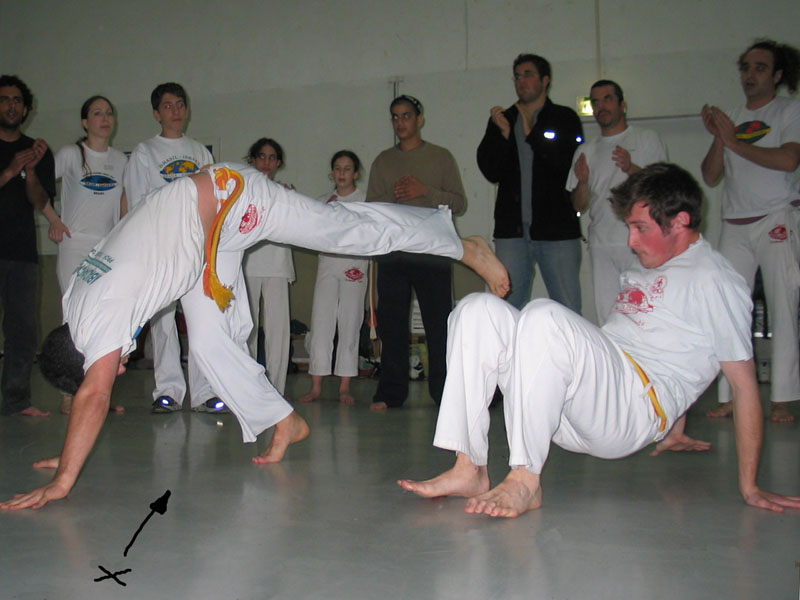
One capoeirista uses a queda de quatro to evade a Rabo de Arraia

Literally fall of four. Simply fall backwards into a crab-walk position, often followed by scurrying backwards and away from the opponent.

=== Queda de três ===
Falling back onto the wrists and one leg. The other leg is up because this position is often "forced" when the player is taken down from being supported on a single leg. For example: sweeping the base leg of armada leads the fallen player to, hopefully, end in this position.

== Kicks ==
=== Push kicks ===
Chapa, the sole of the foot, is a generic term for various straight kicks with the sole of the foot. This kick can be used in a roda to push away the other player for distance.

==== Chapa de frente (Bênção) ====
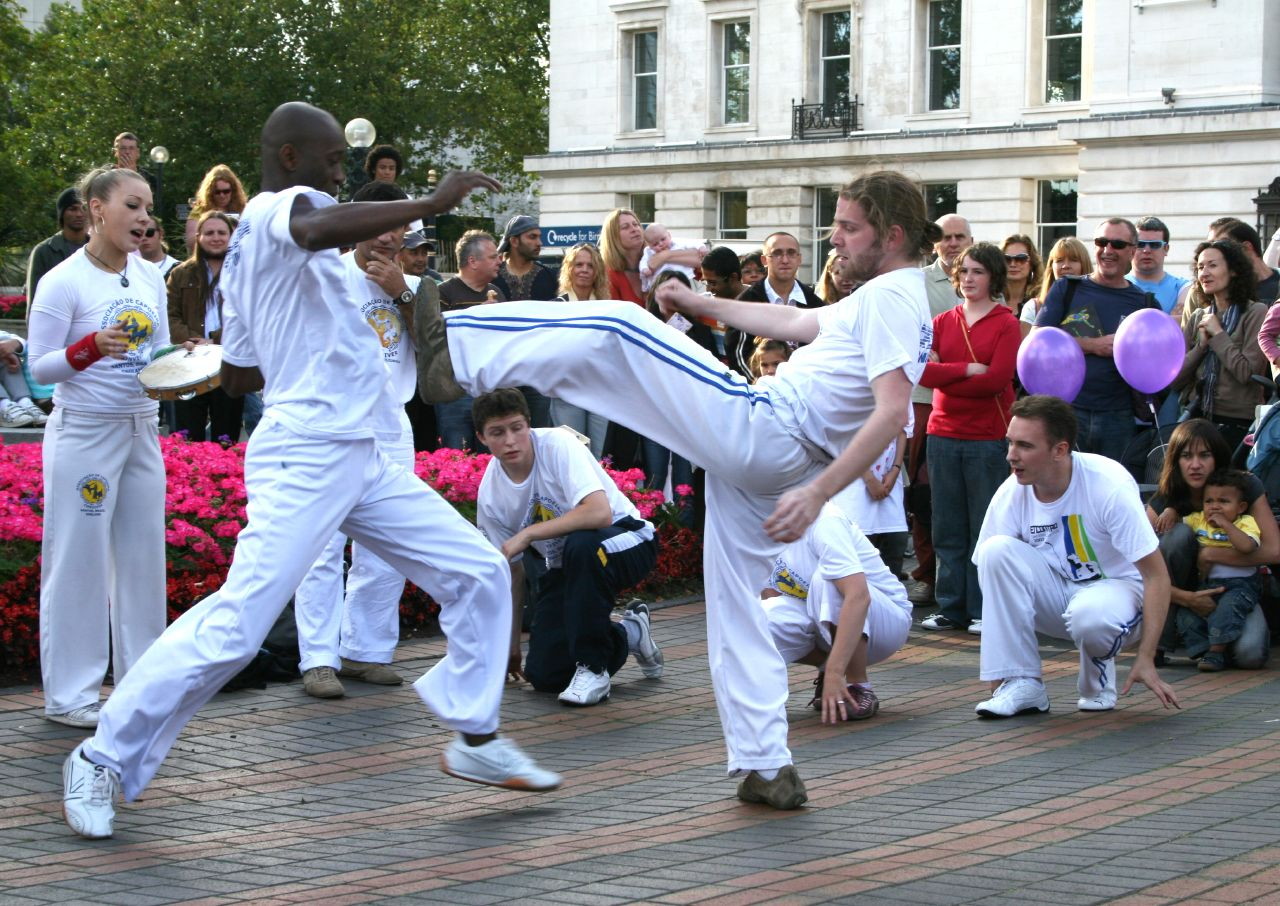
Chapa de frente or bênção kick

Literally "blessing". It is a straight forward frontal push kick. It is commonly aimed at the abdominal or chest area, and the capoeirista hits with either the whole sole of the foot or with the heel. The level of impact varies with its range and intent from a soft tap to an inward jumping stomp to the head, or torso.

There are also low variation of Chapa de frente, performed from the ground, usually from queda de quatro position. It involves pushing with the hips to increase both force and reach.

==== Chapa de costas ====
It resembles a kick from a horse or mule in which both hands are usually on the ground while one of the legs is pushed outward towards the other player. It is a clever attack that can be delivered out of a role towards the groin or knee of the other player.

==== Chapa lateral (Pisão) ====
Another variation being a side kick. First the player begins by lifting the knee of the kicking leg and hip level of the support leg. The capoeirista turns his supporting foot 180 degrees to the rear while thrusting the kicking foot towards the other player's body.

==== Chapa baixa ====
This is a side kick to the lower areas including the thigh, knee, or instep. Impact is usually made with the heel or sole of the foot. As with the pisão, the chapa baixa begins with a forward knee raise. However, instead of rising upwards towards the usual kicking targets capoeira (head, chest, stomach), the kick is driven downward towards the other player's lower extremities. It incorporates the malícia in capoeira appearing as a high kick but ending in an unpredictable painful kick to the knee or thigh. In most rodas this is shown rather than completed to full extension. During the later rounds of his title defense in UFC 97 with Thales Leites, Anderson Silva made extensive use of this technique.

==== Chapa giratória ====
Chapa Giratória

Capoeira's answer for the sole kick. It is done in the same way as ban dae yeop chagi in Taekwondo with the capoeirista stepping forward or diagonally while turning his torso. At the same time he raises his back leg up, unleashing it at the apex of the turn in a straight path.

==== Voo do morcego ====
Literally translated as the "Flight of the bat". This is a flying kick done sideways with both legs. It is executed virtually in the same manner as a dropkick; however, the knees are drawn back in after making contact and one lands on their feet. It would be ridiculous to perform this in the same way as pro wrestlers since landing on the ground would injure the capoeirista more than the opponent. Since it is an aerial attack, balance and control are sacrificed for raw power. As with any attack, the effectiveness of this attack depends on the timing, weight, and body mass. It was a very popular attack in past times, but it is rarely seen in rodas today. In the anime series Afro Samurai, Afro utilizes this kick against his opponents in season 2 although it is not specified where he learned this kick.

=== Crescent kicks ===
==== Meia-lua de frente ====
Meia lua de frente (Front crescent) is an outside crescent kick seen in various martial arts. This kick involves using the hips to generate enough force to bring the foot of the kicking leg across the face of the player. While it can be used as an attack itself, it mainly is used as a poke or trap for another attack. Other uses for it can be as a combination with cartwheels and other acrobatic moves, therefore, working as an escape.

==== Armada (Meia-lua de costas) ====
An armada or meia-lua de costas is a back crescent kick, also described as a spinning inside to outside crescent kick. It can be either a Rabo-de-Arraia without the hands supporting on the floor (the head falls below the waist and the kick is executed with the heel), or a Meia lua de Costas (halfmoon from the back), a spinning kick with the body upright. The striking surface is usually the outside blade of the kicking foot. A queixada and armada are executed in exactly the same way with the exception of the armada beginning with a step to the right or left before releasing the kick. The power of the armada actually comes from the torque placed on the hips from the spin.

After stepping across the body (to the right or left) at around 45 degrees, the hips are spun while the arms are up to protect from punches or other kicks. Once there is enough torque, the kicking leg is "released" rather than kicked. This leg goes around in the same motion as a queixada until the kicking leg has finished its arc all the way back or parallel to the other foot.

==== Armada pulada ====
An Armada that is released after a jump. The armada pulada begins the same way as the regular armada with the capoeirista turning to the left or right. Once the head, neck and shoulders rotate towards the front, he/she jumps during the release of the armada making it a spinning aerial kick.

==== Armada dupla (Envergado) ====
Also known as an envergado. The distinguishing feature of this move is the fact that both legs remain together during the take off, execution, and landing. Its name, Armada dupla, is derived from this feature and also literally means "double armada". After the take off, the torso stays upright and vertical, but will begin to quickly torque in order to swing the legs around and upwards. At the peak of this move, the body is in the shape of a "V". The legs continue to swing over as the body straightens out for the landing. In tricking, this move is called a double leg. Along with the Meia Lua Compasso and Au Malandro/Batida, the armada dupla one of the trademark kicks unique to the art capoeira.

==== Armada com Martelo ====
The armada com martelo, also known as parafuso (screw) is a spinning double kick beginning with an armada pulada and finishing with a martelo. The capoeirista begins with the same motion of the Armada. While the first leg is raised up, he/she jumps off their back leg. Once the first leg completes its arc, the leg that was jumped off of comes around in the form of a jumping martelo rotado.

==== Queixada ====
The queixada is like the inverse of a meia lua de frente. It can be done in two ways - one kick uses the back leg and the other uses the front leg.

Anibal Burlamaqui claimed that he introduced the queixada (jaw) kick to capoeira. In his version, one takes a step in front of the opponent and, always calculating the distance, quickly raises one leg, causing the foot to strike the opponent's jaw.

In Bimba's version, this move is a circular kick, where you lift your leg from the inside to the outside in a circular motion and hit someone's chin with the outer side of your foot. Bimba noted that "it's essentially a strike with the outer side of the foot."

According to Nestor Capoeira, this kick should be directed at the side of the opponent's head, or at the opponent's cheek (queixo in Portuguese).

This is one of the most common basic kicks in regional capoeira.

=== Compass crescent kicks ===
==== Meia-lua de compasso ====
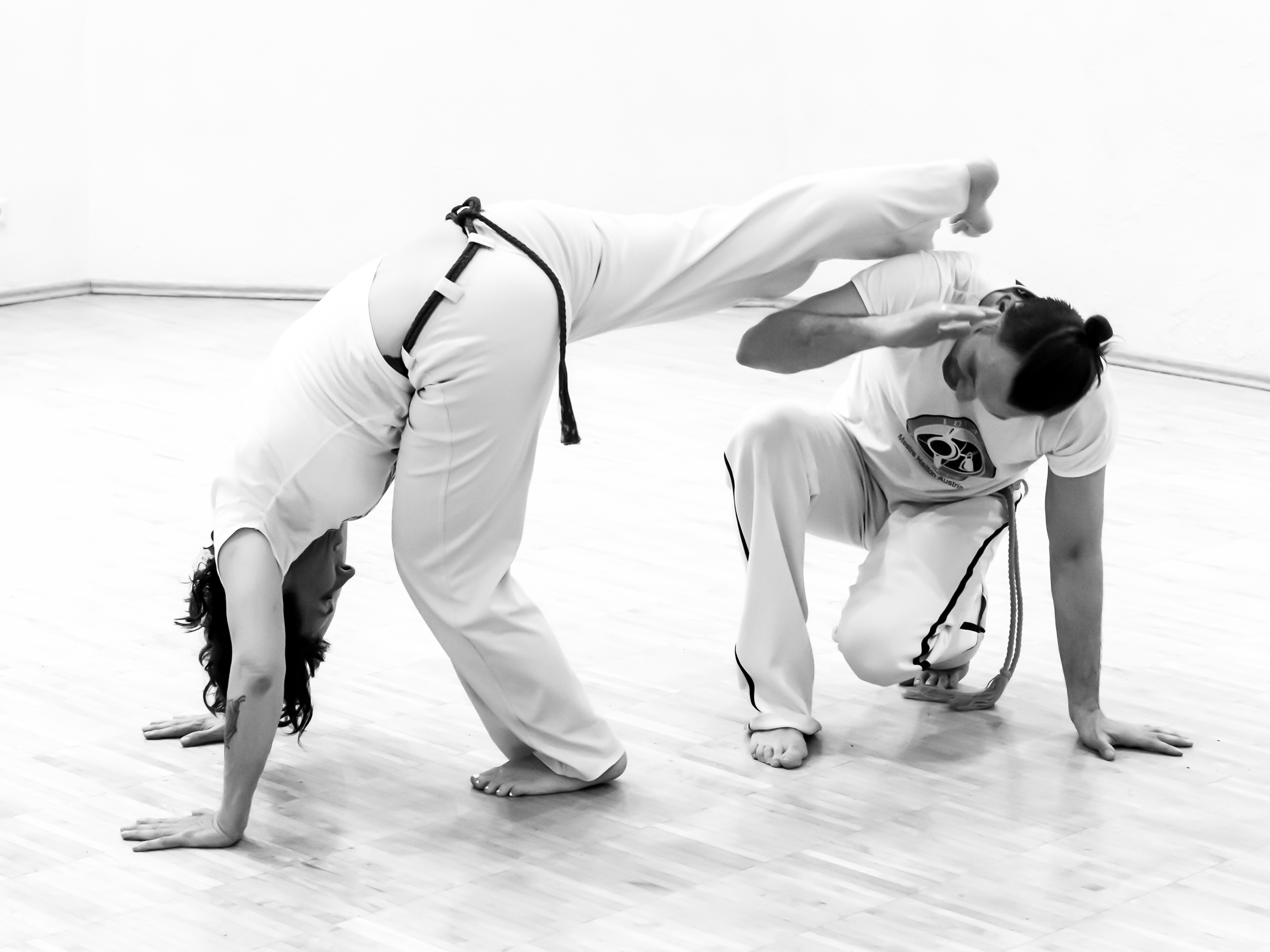
Rabo de arraia or Meia lua de compasso

The Meia-lua de compasso (lit: compass crescent) aka. rabo de arraia (stingray's tail), is an attack that embodies the true element of capoeira since it combines an evasive maneuver with a spinning kick. The transfer of power begins with the hand slamming into the ground and ending with the spin of the kicking heel. The power of the kick derives its energy from the similar centripetal force of a golf club swing. It has earned its place in capoeira as being called the "king of kicks".

The kick is done with the heel.

==== Meia-lua de compasso dupla ====
Meia-lua de compasso dupla.

This is a version of the kick done without either leg in contact with the ground. It combines the motions of a diagonal front handspring and a meia-lua compasso using only the hand or hands to support the body during the kick and complete the spin. It is rarely seen because engaging the core muscles that it uses requires a high level of balance and strength.

==== Meia-lua solta ====
The meia-lua solta is executed in the opposite manner as the meia-lua de compasso dupla. Whereas in the dupla the arms are solely used, in the solta only the pivoting leg and foot are used. It is said to be much faster than the meia-lua de compasso but also much riskier. Taking a foot sweep while performing this can be dangerous because of the lack of a supporting arm to spot the kick. Some groups refer to this as a chibata because of its fast whipping motion.

==== Meia-lua reversão ====
Meia-lua reversão.

A kick that begins as a meia-lua de compasso but ends like a front walkover. The capoeirista releases the kick, but instead of bringing the kicking leg around to complete the motion, he follows the kick with his entire body. He will usually land on the kicking leg and rotate 180 degrees to face the other player again.

==== Meia-lua queda de rins ====
This move is a combination of a meia-lua de compasso and a queda de rins. While turning to release the kick, the capoeirista lowers himself unto his supporting elbow. He/she can complete the movement in a number of ways, with the most common one being the transition into the resistençia.

=== Roundhouse kicks ===
Martelo (hammer) is the name for roundhouse kicks in capoeira. It is generally defined as a strike with the instep, or lower part of the shin against the opponent's body; the most common target is temple of the head. The most common forms of the Martelo include:

==== Martelo em pé ====
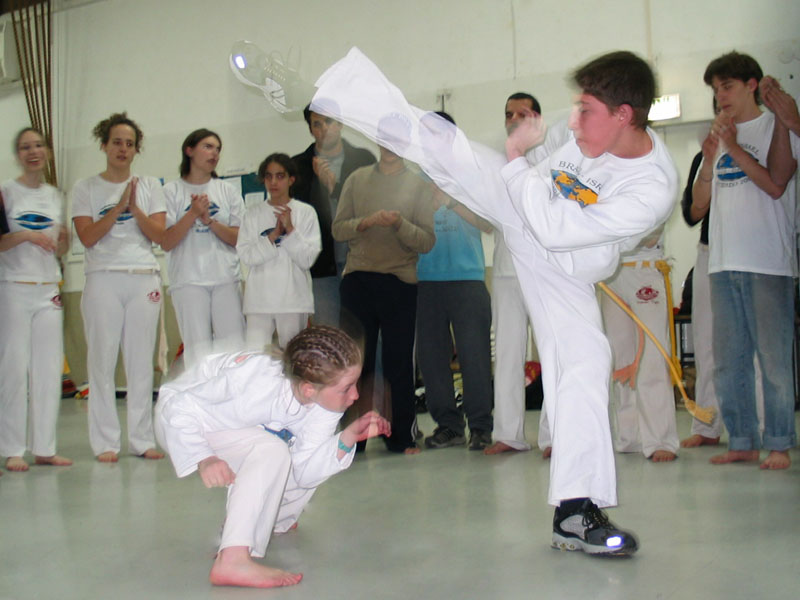
Martelo em pé

This is the most common martelo seen in Regional and Contemporânea rodas. Its execution on the very basic level is identical to the sport version of the roundhouse kick commonly seen in Tae Kwon Do and kickboxing. Capoeira emphasizes using kicks anywhere at any time so advance forms of the martelo em pé can come from fakes, skipping and kicking with the front leg, and from other dodges such as the esquiva diagonal. Emphasis is placed on speed and deception rather than knockout. Even with this precaution knockouts still occur due to the weight and sheer force of the leg.

==== Martelo do chão ====
Martelo do Chão

Martelo do chão or martelo de negativa is a martelo that starts from the negativa position. The Martelo do chão is delivered from a lower position usually right before a rolê while in esquiva baixa or downward going into a queda de rins. This kick has a confusing amount of names, depending on the group.

==== Martelo rodado ====
A spinning martelo, similar to a 540 kick. The martelo rodado combines the 540 or parafuso with a martelo. Whereas the parafuso is a spinning outside to inside crescent, the martelo rodado impacts with the instep. Control is sacrificed for power as the leg does not stop, but follows through with a full rotation of the hips.

=== Snap kicks ===
==== Ponteira ====
Ponteira is the simple front snap-kick with the ball of the foot. It is performed by lifting the knee and quickly extending the leg with toes pulled back while tilting the torso slightly backwards to strike the opponent in the abdomen, chest or face. Contrary to the Benção this is intended as a hard and fast striking kick.

=== Hook kicks ===
==== Gancho ====
The gancho lit. hook, is a hook kick. It is a deceptive attack that starts off in the same way as a martelo or roundhouse kick. The knee and thigh of the kicking leg is brought up and across the body in a diagonal direction. Instead of thrusting in and out like a chapa, the leg is extended toward the body and thrust out in a hooking motion striking with the heel or sole. The path of the heel ends near the buttocks and hamstring as it is brought down. There are other ways of using it such as fake martelos into in or from fake chapas. Because of its deceptiveness, the name gancho is perfect for it since it can sometimes act as the hook for a bait attack that is seen far too late.

==== Gancho Giratório ====
A spinning version of the gancho. It starts out like a spinning chapa but deceptively lashes out and hooks around in the same manner as the gancho.

=== Cartwheel kicks ===
==== Cartwheel kick (Aú batido) ====
The aú batido is an aú variation where a practitioner does a handstand, followed by a twist with the hips and a split, performing a downward martelo. During the kick, one arm is protecting the face while the other one is obviously supporting the body. Aú batido literally means "hitted cartwheel". This movement is a defensive move, used when attempting to perform a cartwheel and the opponent attacks, generally with a cabeçada, a headbutt, the aú batido takes place, attacking the opponent by surprise before the attack is executed. The aú batido is sometimes also used in doubt or simply as a trick move. This move is also performed in tricking, and for quality, it is also used often in breakdancing where it is known as the L-kick. Names used in different schools may also include beija-flor (humming bird, literally "flower kiss(er)"), leque (fan), aú quebrado (broken cartwheel), aú malandro (wily cartwheel), aú amazonas (Amazon cartwheel) or amazônica (Amazonian).

L-kick is found in engolo, ancestor art of capoeira. Engolo developed multiple cartwheel kicks as part of its offensive repertoire.

The aú batido was introduced successfully in mixed martial arts by Anthony Pettis, who has a capoeira background.

==== Kicking cartwheel (Aú batendo) ====
Aú batendo (kicking cartwheel) is a similar technique to aú batido (cartwheel kick), except that the hands generally stay on the ground and the cartwheel is not stopped during the kick, but rather continues over. This can be a very powerful kick in a straight downward direction. It can target opponent performing esquiva or negativa, or be used as a counter attack if an opponent starts a headbutt.

The first leg to leave the ground into the cartwheel should execute the kick. Simultaneously, the second leg extends straight back to balance the weight of the kicking leg. After delivering the kick, capoeirista should continue with the cartwheel and land on the opposite side.

As a floreio, some players pause in the middle of the cartwheel, and alternating their legs back and forth repeatedly.

==== Aú helicóptero ====
Helicóptero kick

Aú helicóptero is an Aú with a circular movement of the legs, like a helicopter. The technique starts off as a regular aú, but when the body is inverted (both legs are off the ground), a twist of the legs is done so that the leg that left the ground second lands on the ground first.

This technique can be combined with the "master swipe" from tricking to add more spin and make the move more aesthetic. The master swipe is a cartwheel where the inside leg leaves the ground first in contrast to the outside leg from a regular cartwheel.

=== Other kicks ===
==== Escorpião ====
There are actually few different versions of the escorpião. The attacking one is very similar to the scorpion kick of other martial arts. It is characterized by kicking backwards, over the head, at a target in front of the kicker impacting with the sole or heel of the foot. The escorpião is very hard to see and is extremely dangerous in the hands of a master.

==== Raiz ====
A raiz is a type of kick used in contemporary regional. It could be described as a sideswipe with less rotation, so the practitioner lands on the rear leg from the take off instead of the kicking leg. However, in terms of tricking, the raiz is not a kick, but rather an evasive move aimed to avoid an attack toward the legs. The set-up for the raiz is exactly like the 540 kick, but the technique required for a successful raiz is similar to a Double Leg. In starting this move, the practitioner turns slightly sideways at the waist with the arm-swing motion. Once the set-up is accomplished, the first leg is thrown straight up while having the head thrown back. This motion causes the practitioner's back to become parallel to the ground. The first leg travels around like a Double Leg and the second leg trails behind it. The first leg lands first on the ground and the second leg lags behind. The second leg should not be rushed, but rather be relaxed and let it fall by itself.

== Head butts ==
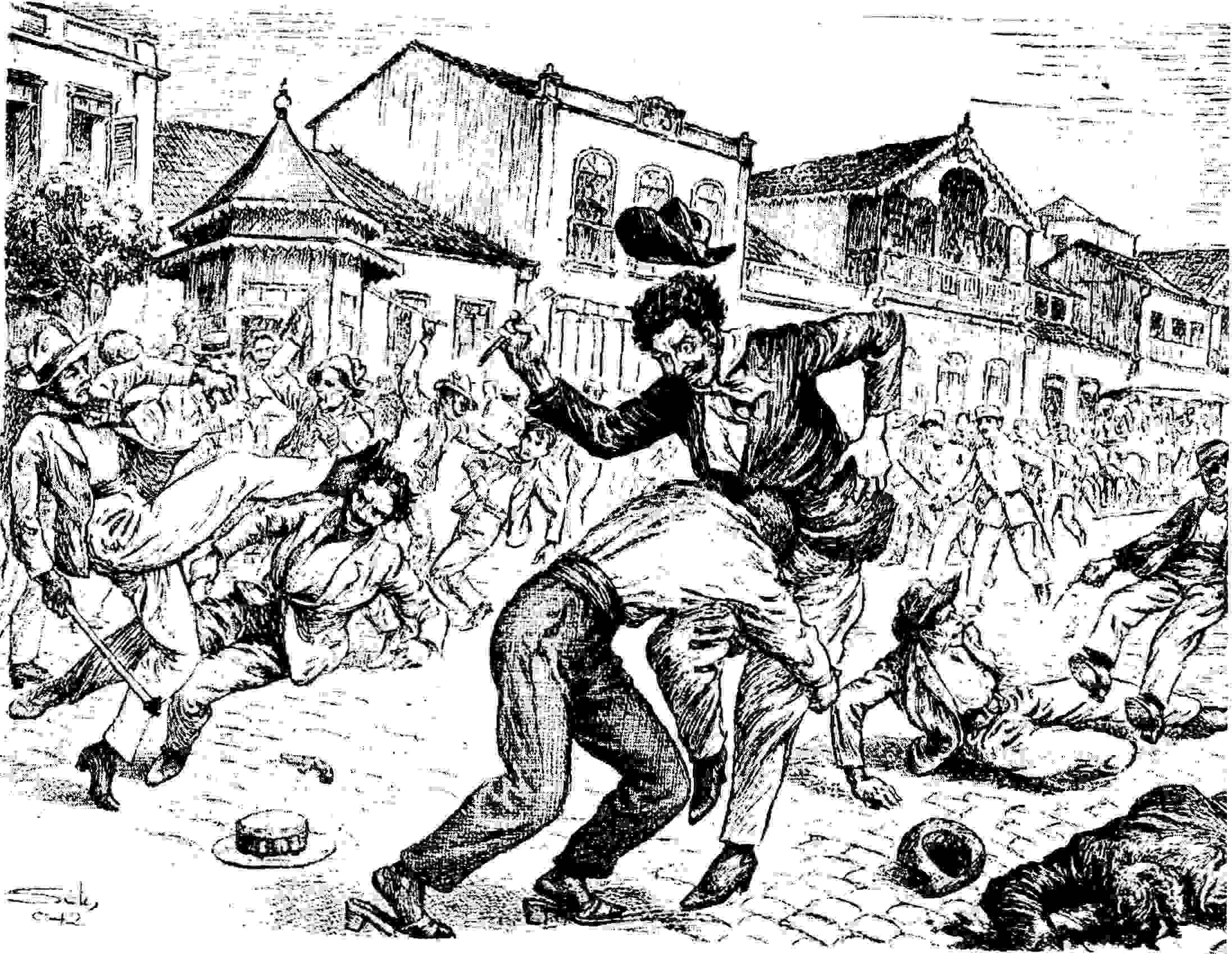
Headbutt in 19th century Rio capoeiragem.

The only significant addition to capoeira, aside from engolo core, was headbutting, a common African practice in the Americas. Headbutts became prominent in street-fighting capoeiragem due to their effectiveness, but remained relatively infrequent in the game. In modern capoeira, headbutts are used more as a defensive tactic to keep a dangerously close opponent at bay rather than as a prominent technique.

=== Cabeçada ===
The Cabeçada (pronounced: ka-be-SA-da, lit.: headbutt) is an offensive movement of Capoeira in which the attacker pushes the opponent with his head or forehead. Generally a cabeçada is performed when the opponent is executing an open aú (cartwheel) but can be performed against any move where the belly of an opponent is exposed. A less playful version of this technique is when instead of the forehead both elbows are pushed into the defender's abdomen. Another variation on this technique involves first entering a push-up like position but with the hips raised the head is then thrust forward into the target. This is usually used when both players are on the ground.

=== Arpão de Cabeça ===
This is a headbutt that involved the capoeirista throwing his full body into the headbutt. While the cabeçda can be seen as playful, this is its more violent cousin. By usually ducking under a kick or punch, the player will spring forward with full force targeting the head, stomach, or groin.

=== Escorumelo ===
This is a less playful headbutt that moves in an upward direction. The head goes under the attack and comes up hitting the bottom of the chin. This gives it the same application as an uppercut combined with the weight of the entire body rising along with the head.

== Hand strikes ==
Although it is less known, capoeira includes a variety of hand strikes. In the Angolan style, these strikes are showcased but deliberately halted just before contact, creating a mesmerizing display of arm, hand, and elbow movements known as "jogo de mao" (hand game). This game represents a swinging and waving of hands to diminish any perception of an attack and lower the opponent's guard. In Regional capoeira, which prioritizes combat over ritual, hand strikes like the galopante are often executed fully.

Traditionally, hand strikes were rarely used in capoeira, the mythological reasoning behind this being that the shackles and chains of the slaves prevented this. However, punches, elbows, and slaps have always existed in street rodas all around Brazil.

=== Asfixiante ===
While the literal translation of this is based on suffocation or rather the act of it, the asfixiante is a straight punch thrown with either hand. Taking clues from its name, the target may have originally been the throat instead of the face.

=== Cutelo ===
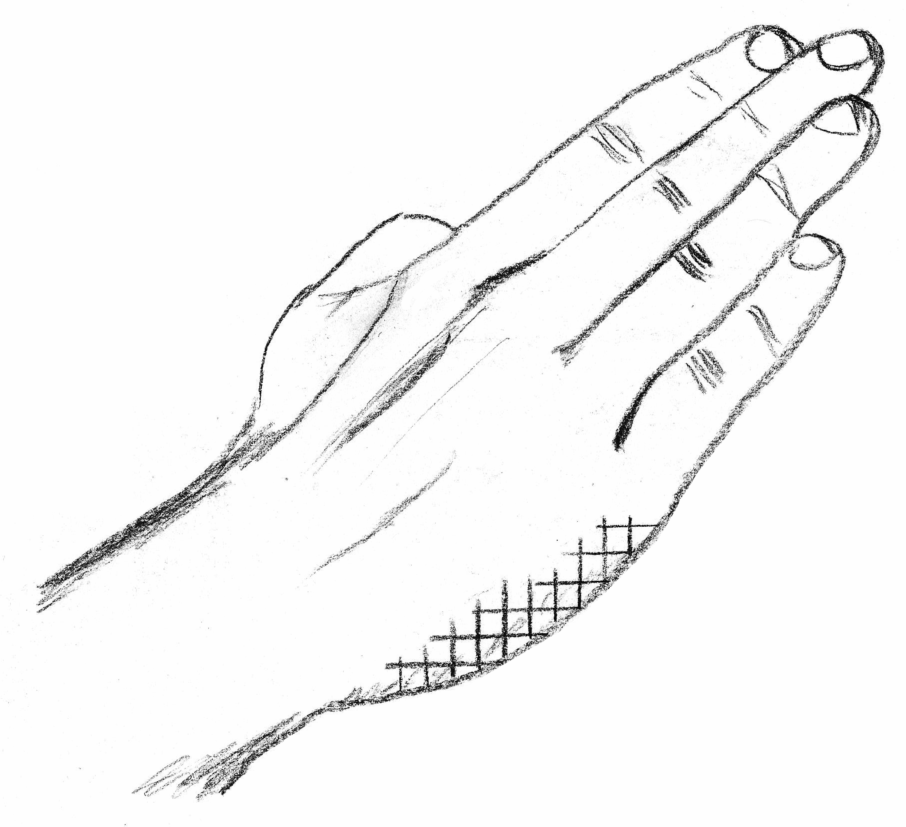
Knifehand strike was one of the principal capoeira techniques in the 1950s.

The cutelo (cleaver), also known as cutilada de mão (hand cut or hand chop), is a knifehand strike attack.

Cutilada de mão is a blow applied with the hand, in the form of a cleaver, on numerous parts of the body. It is applied in the same way as the karate chop usually to the face, temple, or base of the neck. Its application in certain areas can have serious consequences.

The arc of travel for the cutelo usually begins on the outside to inside combining a backhand attack with a knifehand.

For mestre Pastinha, knifehand strike was one of the principal techniques in traditional capoeira. Although capoeiristas generally fight at a distance with kicks, when they are closer, the knifehand strikes are applied. The cutelo is not as present in today's capoeira as it once was.

=== Cotovelada ===
The cotovelada is an elbow strike usually from outside to inside. In all forms of martial arts, range plays a very important role. When two capoeiristas are playing a close aggressive game it would be foolish to throw a kick or punch at such a close range. The cotovelada is a quick surprise attack when things get too close. This strike can be extremely painful and damaging if performed right.

=== Dedeira ===
An attack to the eyes that reveals the street fighting origins of capoeira. It is rarely executed in rodas today because of the harm it can cause. It is an eyepoke with the index and middle finger of the attacking hand. This attack was usually done to disorientate the target for a quick escape or in some cases, rob them. In most capoeira rodas, the Dedeira will be shown, but never fully executed. When combined with the element of surprise, the dedeira was a very useful ambush weapon.

=== Galopante ===
The galopante is more of a slap than a punch. The capoeirista strikes the side of the opponents face or ear with his open hand in a swinging motion. In most cases the galopante is not meant to cause much damage to the opponent. It is instead used as a distraction or to tell the opponent that his guard is too open. However, it is a handslap that follows the same trajectory and principles of a hook punch using the body's core making it just as damaging in the right "hands".

=== Godeme ===
Backhand strike, normally to the face. The hand can made into a fist making it a backfist or done openhanded as a slap. When swinging, the arms are relaxed making the strike faster and the sting more painful. The godeme is obviously an aggressive attack. According to Capoeira lore, the move was named when Mestre Bimba was sparring with some Americans. He was establishing the names they had for various techniques when performed this strike to the head to his partner, who responded with a hearty "God damn!" which Mestre Bimba assumed was their name for it. While the error was explained to him afterwards, he liked the name enough to retain it.

=== Telefone ===
An attack with both hands slapping the opponent's ears at the same time. This attack is used rarely in the roda as it is considered too aggressive. The telefone is very painful and disorienting because of the sudden burst of air pressure entering the ear canal. It is possible for this attack, if done in a malicious way, to cause permanent damage to the eardrum. Its name is a use of wordplay based on a telephone call.

== Takedowns ==
Takedowns are normally considered a bit aggressive in capoeira, and attempting a takedown might be seen as a test of one's skills. However, the frequency of takedowns in the roda varies from group to group and type of game. One situation where takedowns are common, is during the Batizado ceremony. This is when the Mestre (Master) gives the new students their first cordão, or the senior students their next cord according to their progression in capoeira. In such a ceremony, the mestre(s) will try to take his students down, sometimes several times during a game. In the same manner of a baptism of going underwater and emerging a new person, the takedown of a novice is seen as bring them down and them rising as a new baptized capoeirista.

Due to the strong emphasis on kicking, the most common takedowns in capoeira are sweeps; however, there are also other takedowns utilizing the hands, arms, legs or shoulders to push, lift, or even throw the opponent to the ground.

=== Açoite de Braço ===
This throw is rarely seen. It was designed to be used for self-defense. If an attacker was approaching the capoeirista from behind using a club or cheap punch, the capoeirista would duck under the attack simultaneously scooping the leg of the attacker up. He would continue the motion, the attacker off of his shoulders and slamming him to the ground. The closest throw to this is the kata guruma also seen in judo.

The above version is found in the books by Nestor Capoeira; however, in the original Regional style of Mestre Bimba, Açoite de Braço (lit. arm whip) is a shoulder throw similar to ippon seoi nage in judo – capoeirista grasps one arm of his opponent with both hands, turns around and throws him over the back.

=== Arrastão ===
Classic leg takedown. The capoeirista grabs the opponent behind the knees and pulls/lifts while pushing the opponent backwards with their shoulder, driving him to the ground. While seen as a double leg takedown, in many situations it will change to a single leg takedown. Ironically in the evolution of things, this move is usually countered with a sprawl or even a guillotine choke depending on the school or academy. An alternate technique used by some groups is for the capoeirista to take the opponent down laterally, as opposed to a football-tackle style takedown. Using their head to push the opponent's hips sideways, forcing the opponent to balance upon one leg, the capoeirista then uses their arms to sweep the remaining leg from underneath the opponent, completing the takedown. The opponent's legs should be swept so that they land in front of the capoeirista's legs instead of in between, for defensive reasons. Upon discovery of this takedown, some casual viewers learn to see capoeira as more than a recreational "dance".

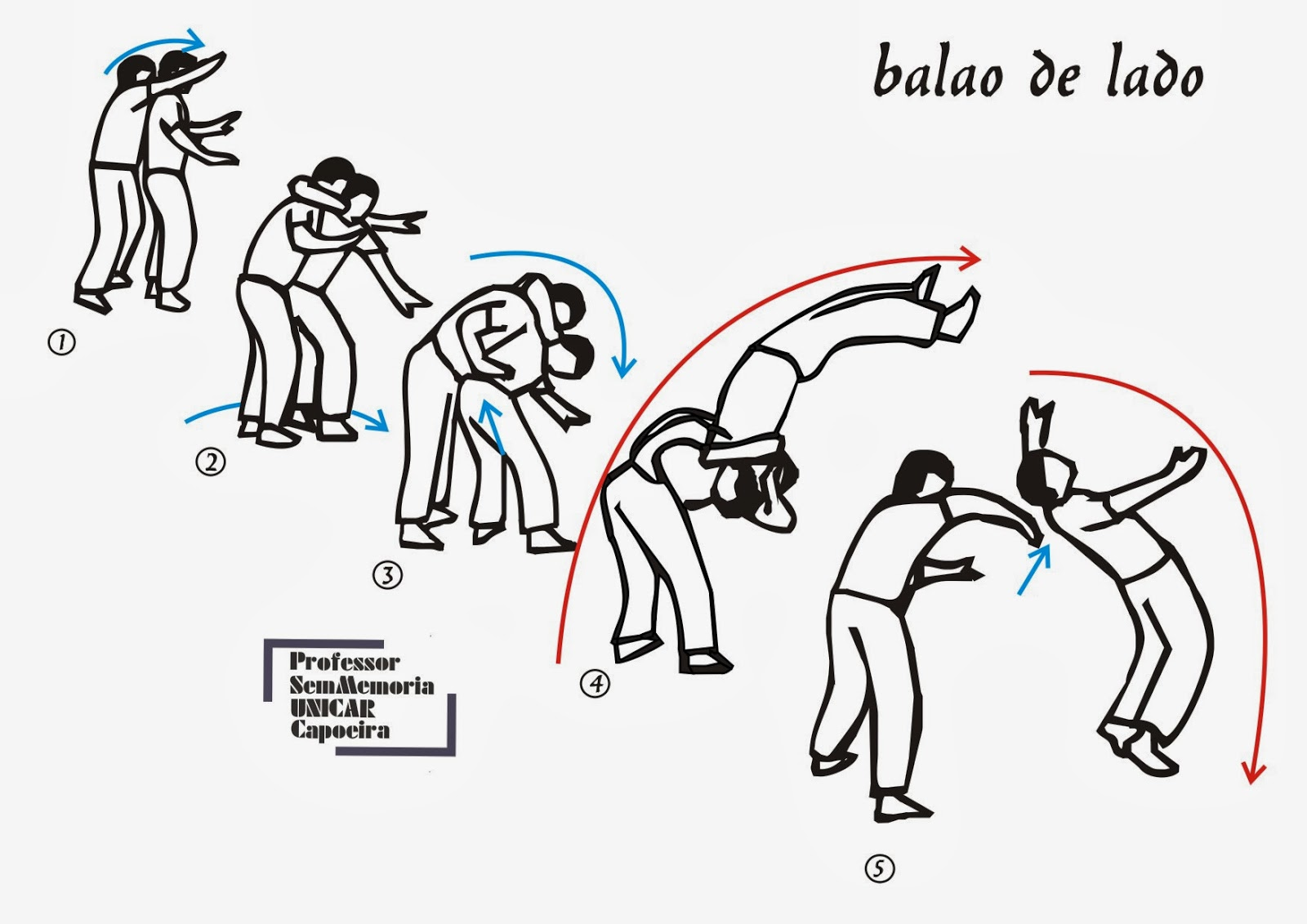
Balão de Lado

=== Balão de Lado ===
In this takedown, the capoeirista wraps the opponent's head with an arm from behind and bends over, lifting the opponent and rotating the body to throw him to the ground. This technique resembles the koshi guruma taught in judo.

=== Banda ===
Banda is a sweep kick, the objective of which is to pull one of the opponent's feet making him lose his balance and fall. It usually is performed from a standing position. What separates the banda from the rasteira is that the sweep is mostly done with the heel of the foot instead of the instep.

==== Banda de Costas ====
Banda de Costas

A defensive counter-attack performed against a kick. This is usually reserved for circular kicks such as the armada or queixada. By following the motion of the kick, the capoeirista steps to the outside of the kicker and uses one hand to push them forward while the closest leg reaps the supporting leg of the kicker. It looks identical to the osoto guruma in judo.

==== Banda de Dentro ====
The banda de dentro or passa-pé is a similar sweep as the rasteira em pé. While the banda de costas focuses on sweeping the kicking leg from the inside instead. While one capoeirista is delivering a kick such as a martelo, the other player steps inside and sweeps the supporting leg in an inside to outside motion.

==== Banda Traçada ====
A basic move in which the user sweeps the opponent's leg with his foot, especially in midst of performing a bigger movement. It is similar to the harai tsurikomi ashi from judo.

=== Boca de Calça ===
A takedown executed by grabbing the opponent's pant legs or ankles and pulling.

==== Boca de Calça de Costas ====
A version of the Boca de Calça that involves turning your back, reaching between your legs, and pulling the other player down by his ankles or cuffs. It is usually done crouching under a kick and pulling the supporting ankle of the leg not extended through the capoeirista's leg. This is not as easy as it sounds because of the timing involved. Many who see this coming would go for a rear naked choke by hopping onto the capoeirista's back. A dangerous counter to this is a jump backwards ensuring the person applying the choke receives the blunt force of the ground.

=== Corta-Capim ===
Corta-Capim

Literally "Grass-Cutter". This sweep is done largely as a counter. The capoeirista drops beneath the kick and brings the knife edge of their foot across into the attacker's ankle or instep. this technique is rarely performed with any real force. It is more used to show what could have been done. The movement is identical to the Coffee Grinder movement in breakdancing.

=== Cruz ===
This is another example of a takedown in capoeira that uses the attack against the attacker. When a straight kick such as a chapa or bencão is thrown towards the capoeirista, he simply ducks under the attack. After ducking under the kick, he catches and traps the kicking leg with his back( Trapezius muscle and shoulders) and outstretched arms forming a cross. By standing up (or in some cases jumping) with the kicking leg trapped along the blades of his shoulder, he provides the leverage necessary to knock his attacker to the ground.

=== Negativa Derrubando ===
While in a negativa, the front foot slips behind the heel of the other opponent. After catching the pull of the leg along with the instep hooking the heel should cause the player to fall backwards.

=== Paulista ===
Much like the rasteira, the paulista is a sweep that uses the instep. However, instead of sweeping with the outside leg, the inside leg is used.

=== Rasteira ===
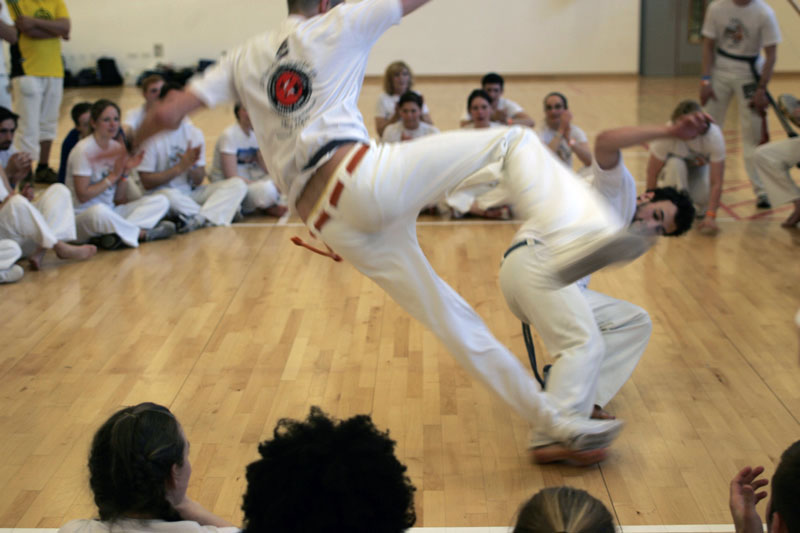
Rasteira

A Rasteira is a movement in capoeira used to sweep or pull an opponent's leg in response to a kick. There are generally four different types: rasteira do chão, rasteira em pé, rasteira de costas, and rasteira com mão. Many mestres agree that the rasteira is a true embodiment of what capoeira really is.

Instead of meeting the kick with a block, the rasteira follows the same direction of the attack turning the opponent's force and confidence against himself. The theory being that the more committed to the attack a player is, the harder they will fall from a rasteira, e.g. When one player kicks with an armada, a well placed rasteira to the supporting leg will make him/her lose their balance and fall. One crucial point to remember is that timing is everything when employing a rasteira. A player just beginning his/her attack is easier to trip verses one whom is firmly planted.

==== Rasteira do chão ====
This is the most common form of a rasteira characterized by its long extension of the hooking leg, use of one or two hands for balance, and lower center of gravity. The capoeirista moves under the incoming kick, hooks the opponent's standing heel or ankle with his instep and pulls it in a straight motion. The rasteira do chão allows the capoeirista to use the muscles in the torso as well as his body weight for more leverage, making it a much stronger takedown. It takes a little longer to execute than a rasteira em pé making them more suitable for medium to high spinning kicks and/or when playing games of benguela or angola.

==== Rasteira em pé ====
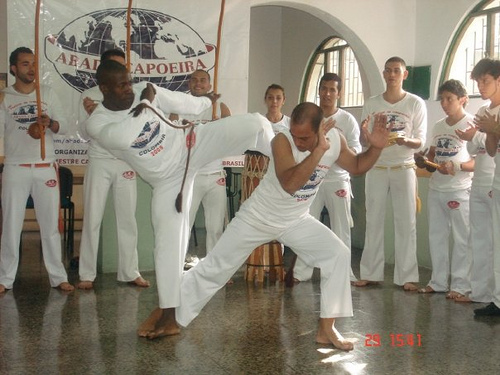
Rasteira em pé against a martelo

Much like the rasteira above, this movement is virtually the same with a few differences. While the rasteira do chão is used more for circular attacks, the rasteira em pé is more suitable for quicker or direct attacks such as the martelo or in faster games. The capoeirista does not crouch as low when hooking his foot around the supporting leg of the other kicker with the power coming more from the step vs the torso. This version of the rasteira allows for a much faster execution.

==== Rasteira de mão ====
This version makes use of the hand. Sometimes in a close game when using the leg requires too much time and energy, this is used instead. While going along with the motion of the kick, the capoeirista ducks under the kick, grabs the supporting leg, and pulls it leg with his/her hand towards him/her in the same direction as a rasteira using the instep.

==== Rasteira de costas ====
Rasteira de Costa

A rasteira de costas is a departure from the pulling motion seen in previous versions rasteiras. It is more of a spinning back sweep kick that moves in a half circle with the sweeping leg aimed more for the ankle of the supporting leg. Instead of pulling, the impact from the heel is what causes the other player to fall. This takedown can be seen in other martial art disciplines such as Kung Fu, Hapkido, Pencak Silat, and Kajukenbo. The rasteira de costa can be used against a spinning attack or an opponent that has a more linear fighting stance.

=== Tesoura ===
The tesoura (scissors) is a takedown move. There are two types of scissors: the front scissors and the back scissors. In the early 20th century capoeira, it was performed by the attacker lying on the ground with their belly either up or down, and then crossing their legs with those of the opponent. The attacker then turns their legs violently, causing the opponent to fall to the left or right side.

==== Tesoura de frente ====
In the front scissors (tesoura de frente), the capoeirista, while in queda de quatro position and moving forward, attempts to position themselves in a way that places the opponent's legs between their own. Upon achieving this, the capoeirista sits down and forcefully rotates their torso to the side. The legs make a scissor-like movement to bring down the opponent.

==== Tesoura de costas ====
According to Da Costa, to do a back scissors (tesoura de costas), the capoeirista jumps at the opponent and inserting their legs between the opponent's legs, facing the ground and looking at the opponent. They keep their arms fully extended to support their body. Once the capoeirista has locked in the position, they use one arm as a base and rotate their body to the side, forcing their legs to "scissor" the opponent and bring them to the ground.

In other variant, tesoura de costas is done by wrapping one leg over the front of the opponent's body near the stomach with the other behind both knees, and then twisting own body in the direction the players wants the opponent to fall; usually on their back. It is virtually identical to a kani basami.

==== Tesoura angola ====
Commonly performed from negativa or queda-de-rins, the capoeirista goes to a prone position, legs facing the opponent and scissored out, hips twisted to protect the groin, supporting themselves on their hands and toes. They then advance upon the opponent by pushing themselves along with their hands, watching by craning their neck over one shoulder, threatening a tesoura de frente. The opponent is expected to escape, traditionally via an aú or by diving over the attacking capoeirist, possibly going into their own Tesoura Angola upon landing. A more daring escape can be performed by traveling under the attacking capoeirista, optionally striking them with an escorpião you pass under them.

=== Tombo-de-Ladeira ===
Meaning the Tumbling Slope, AKA, João Pequeno (named for Mestre João Pequeno who is known for making the move popular). In Capoeira Angola it is a kick from out of an au when one of the legs comes down as an axe kick. The Tombo de Ladeira can also be performed from Rolê position (Queda de Três). It is most effective when the opponent's head is low to the ground.

According to Nestor Capoeira, Tombo-de-Ladeira is a takedown in which one takes advantage of an opponent using an aerial or close to aerial attack or movement by standing up from beneath them. Needless to say, it is dangerous for both parties involved.

=== Vingativa ===
A low takedown that involves stepping forward and trapping the back legs of an opponent that is in a side stance. The capoeirista also protects his face with his elbow. Once the lead leg of the capoeirista has trapped the leg of the opponent, he shifts the weight in his hips forward and up. If the contact is maintained with the legs the other player then he should be thrown up and away. Although this move originally came from batuque, it has similar appearances as some throws/sweeps in Baguazhang, as well as the tai otoshi done in some styles of karate. Other schools teach a variation which resembles more the sukui nage or obi otoshi found in judo.

== Acrobatics ==
=== Bananeira ===
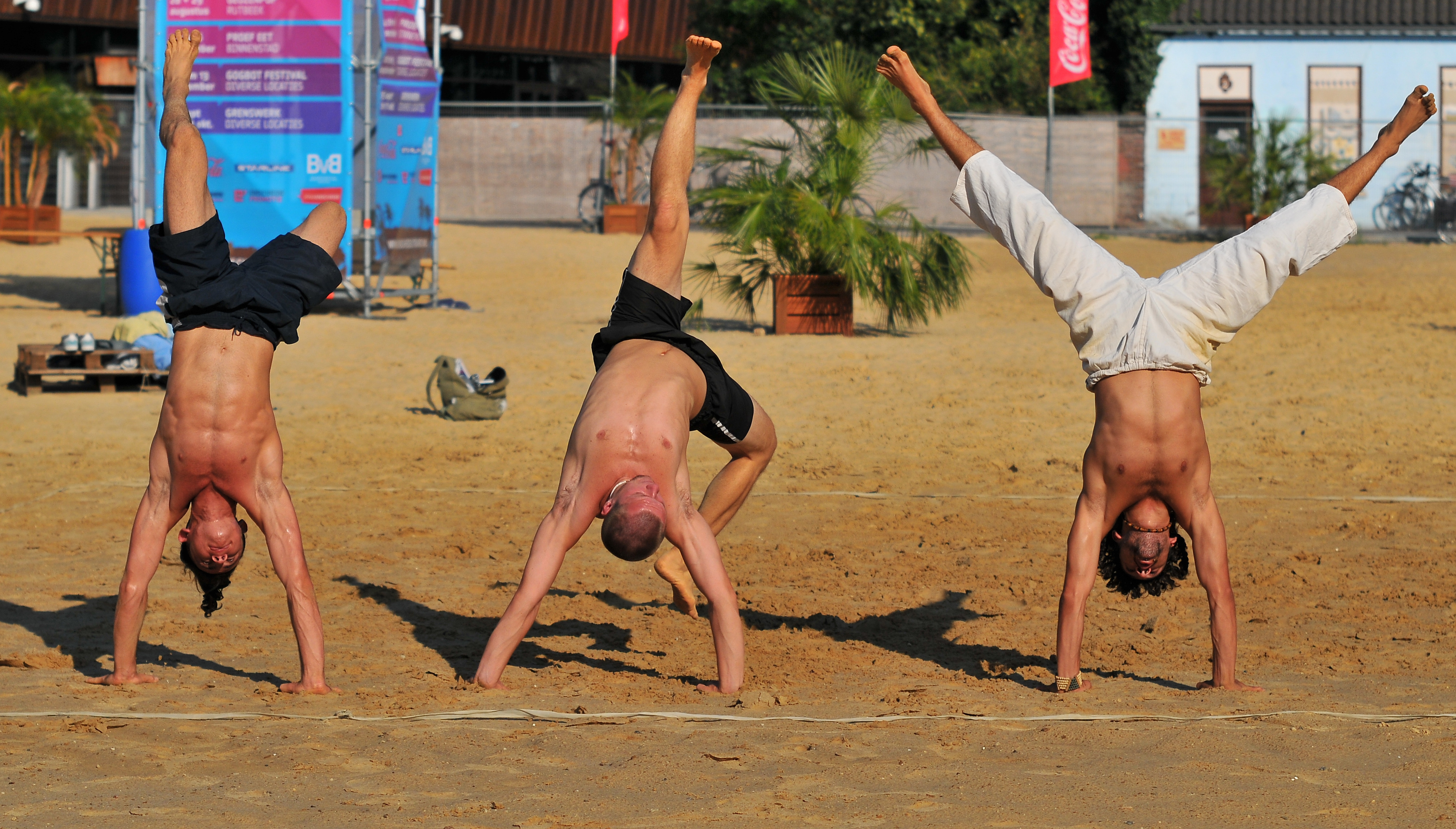
Capoeira guys doing handstand on beach

The bananeira (banana tree) is the name for handstand in capoeira. The hands are spread at least shoulder-width apart and the legs are usually together over the capoeirista's head. Other variations include having the legs split apart to the side or front. One outlying characteristic of handstand in capoeira is that the eyes of the capoeirista are towards the opponent, not the ground.

While in bananeira, the capoeirista can attack from above to below, move in any direction, or return to the normal position. The legs can be used for both defense and attack. The bananeira's other uses can be to take a quick break and observe the other player, draw an opponent into a trap, or show off balance and strength as a floreio. Furthermore, the handstand develops high resistance in the upper limbs.

While the capoeirista is in the handstand, he is open to attacks against his chest, such as chapa de frente or headbutt.

The bananeira is thought to have originated from the use of the handstand by an Nganga (Bantu spiritual healers) by showing their spiritual connection to the ancestors who walk on their hands in the spirit world.

=== S-Dobrado ===
The S-Dobrado is the generic name for a series of motions that takes a capoeirista from a low position to whip one leg across the floor in a half circle, then kick up his legs and invert onto his hands and then land back on his feet and stand. The S refers to shape traced by the motion of the leg which leads the move. It is used as a transitional move and there are many variations of the S-Dobrado. A basic S-Dobrado can start from a Negativa, whip the straight leg around in a half circle to face the other direction, kick up into a Macaco. Another variation involves going from Corta Capim, then kicking up into Macaco. While inverted, the capoeirista can Aú, or stop and do a Bananeira, or even sink down into a Queda De Rins. It is a very versatile technique for a capoeirista.

=== Macaco ===
The macaco is similar to a back handspring with the exception of starting with one hand planted behind the capoeirista and the initial movement starting from a low crouch. The macaco begins by lowering the body down into a low crouch and placing one hand on the floor directly behind the back making contact with the ground. The other hand is thrown over the body while jumping off with both feet to launch the hips straight over the head. This back sweeping movement mirrors the motion that a swimmer adopts when performing a backstroke. As the capoeirista passes into a handstand position, the second hand is placed onto the ground before bringing the first foot makes contact with the ground. The macaco shares visual similarities with the valdez. Variations can include beginning and finishing with the first arm and/or landing with both feet simultaneously. The move is commonly known as the jump of the monkey as the word Macaco literally translates to monkey.

==== Macaquinho ====
This movement is very similar to the macaco with the exception being that it is lower and less explosive. The knees are in a more forward bent position while one arm is placed directly behind the balls of the feet. Instead of jumping as with the macaco, the capoeirista lowers his/her external oblique onto his elbow and brings his other arm and legs over his head. The macaquinho, translating to little monkey, is a combination of a macaco and queda de rins.

==== Macaco em Pé ====
Macaco em pe

This is a macaco that is done without a hop or crouch. The macaco em pé resembles the combined motions of a back walkover and a cartwheel. Instead of crouching and jumping, the capoeirista falls backwards onto one arm while bending his back and allowing his hips to go over his head while moving into a standard macaco motion.

==== Macaco Lateral ====
This is also known as a Xango. It is a standard back handspring. Instead of placing one hand on the ground and flipping over, a leap is made backwards in an arch while extending the hands over the head. This move is used more for entering the roda.

=== Bandeira ===
Bandeira is an advanced capoeira combination in which the player performs a fast cartwheel which is immediately followed by a side flip. This move can be often seen in capoeira regional roda.

=== Folha Seca ===
A Folha Seca (lit. dry leaf) is very similar to a Flash Kick. The direction k with the capoeirista kicking with more of a slant in his body during the rotation. After turning at least 90 degrees to the left or right, the capoeirista raises their kicking leg up while jumping off of their support leg, then brings their arms up while hollowing out their back before continuing the kick until landing on their kicking leg.

==== Folha Seca Helicóptero ====
A hyped variation of the folha seca in which a quick change of legs is done in mid air and is landed on the non-kicking leg. In this move, right after the take off, the kicking leg swings over and around the non-kicking leg creating a helicopter like motion.

==== Chute na lua ====
A Chute na lua (lit. kick to the moon) is a combination of a Flash Kick and gainer. While it can commonly be linked to an S-dobrado, it can also be performed out of nowhere. After pivoting on the non-kicking leg, the kicking leg is swung straight through and up. Both arms are raised and the back is hallowed out. The kicking legs is kept straight while the non-kicking leg is bent. The kicking leg continues all the way around until the capoeirista lands on it.

=== Relógio ===
The relogio has similar mechanics as the hand glide in B-boying. The main exception to the rule is that the body is resting on the kidneys in a more lateral manner with the body facing to the side. The entry into a relogio usually begins in the same way as a rolé. The body turns as both hands touch the ground. One hand is lifted as the body is rested on the elbow of the arm in contact with the ground. The spin point is the small portion of the carpus (same as the 1990 or piao de mao), so that there is a minimal amount of friction between the hand and the ground. While the relogio is a floeiro it can also be a sweep depending on the timing.

=== Pião de Mão ===
A hand spin that is done in a very similar way as the 1990 in breakdancing. The capoeirista begins by turning his body in the same manner as a meia lua de compasso. By generating enough torque, he raises his leg which is the opposite the hand he places down. Keeping the weight of the entire body focused on the outer lower portion of his palm, the capoeirista can keep the circular momentum spin going by lowering the amount of friction between his hand and the surface simultaneously alternating hands during the spins. The variations and ending positions for this move are virtually limitless.

=== Pião de Cabeça ===
It is a headspin in capoeira. There are numerous ways of executing this technique. One of them being, after going down into a queda de rins, the capoeirista brings his legs and hip over until all of his weight is on his head and shoulders. By twisting his hips and legs around in a counter clockwise/clockwise fashion, the body's core develops torque. After releasing his/her hands from the ground, the capoeirista will spin for 180 up to 720 degrees around (depending on his/skill level and balance). One rule of thumb is that the capoeirista begins this move facing the other player. This particular move has been a subject of debate in the ongoing argument of capoeira influencing being the direct predecessor of breakdancing.

=== Mortal (carpado) ===
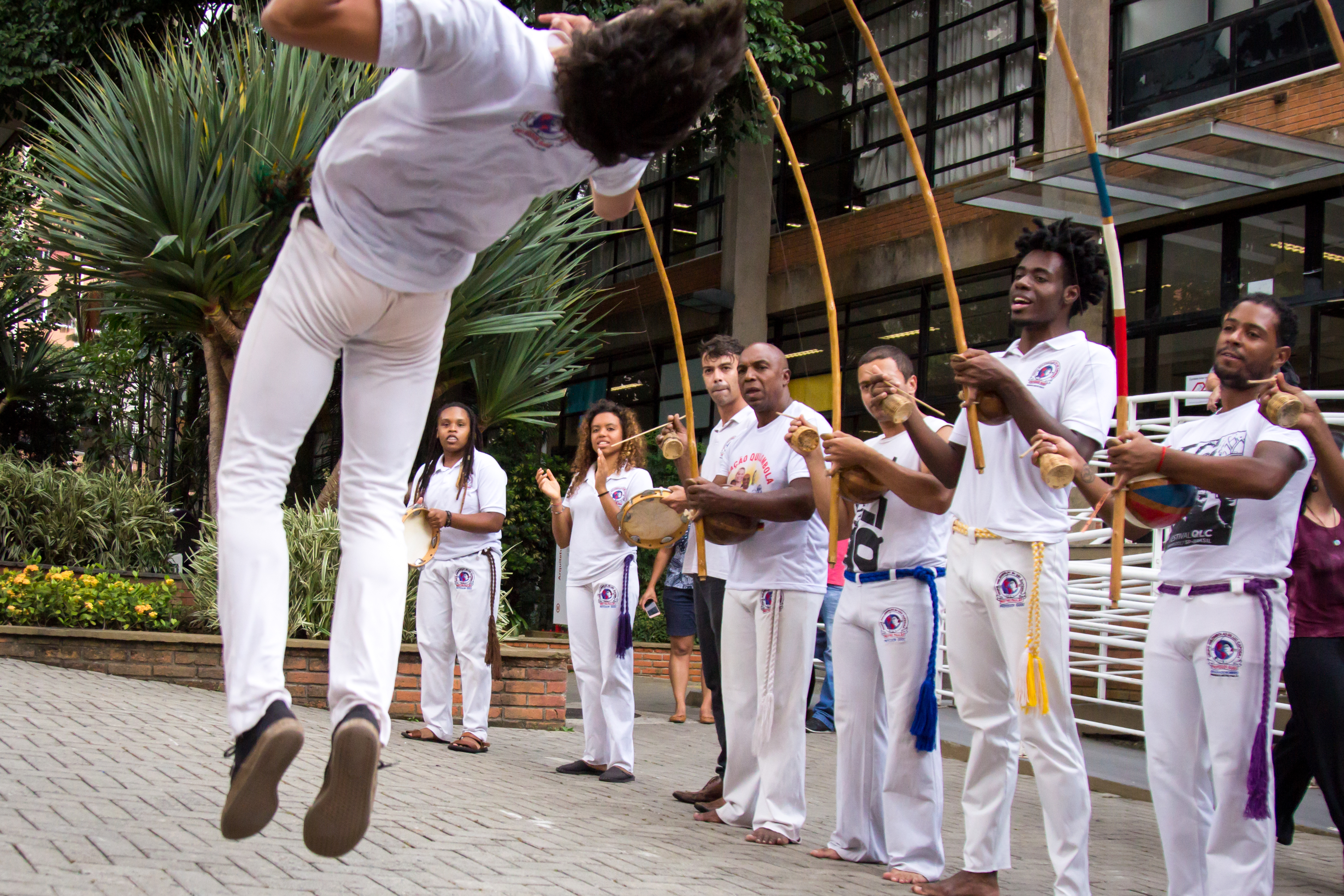
Street capoeira music with acrobatics

It is essentially some kind of flip. This is one of the many movements that separates Capoeira Regional from its grounded sister, Capoeira Angola. Capoeira is known for its acrobatics and the mortal is one of its many indicators. Always depending on the toque of the game and sometimes group, a mortal can be done at almost any time during the game. Since many capoeiristas see the game of capoeira as an interacting physical dialogue between two bodies, the mortal's place in capoeira is well received depending on its timing. Most mortals are done during the entrance into a roda with a fast-paced game. With so many dynamic movements in capoeira, a mortal is done from almost any spinning kick or au. With all things in capoeira, there is some debate over the "overuse" of mortals and other flips as some see them as only shallow movements that take away from the effectiveness of the martial art.

- Salto

This is a generic term for a back somersault. Usually, but not limited to, entering into rodas and solos during performances. After executing a round off and back handspring (xango), the player jumps up while raising both his arms and knees. He/she continues over until landing on both feet. The variation that capoeira is known for is the landing on one foot.

- Mortal de Frente

=== Mariposa ===
The mariposa is not a butterfly kick, but rather a Butterfly twist. While there are many entrances into the spin (for example, a capoeirista could enter into the movement with a folha secca and then continue with the movement, which is more commonly called a corkscrew), it is commonly seen as a complete 360 spin of the body while it is horizontal in the air. Debate has surfaced on when this first appeared. In the final fight scene in Only the Strong, kung-fu artist Marc Dacascos executes this as his finishing move against the other fighter. Since then, the mariposa has been spotted in rodas all over the world.

== Literature ==
- Burlamaqui, Anibal (1928). Gymnástica nacional (capoeiragem), methodisada e regrada. Rio de Janeiro.
- Da Costa, Lamartine Pereira (1961). Capoeiragem, a arte da defesa pessoal brasileira. Rio de Janeiro: Oficial da Marinha.
- Pastinha, Mestre (1988). Capoeira Angola. Fundação Cultural do Estado da Bahia.
- Capoeira, Nestor (2002). Capoeira: Roots of the Dance-Fight-Game. Blue Snake Books. ISBN 978-1-58394-637-4.
- Assunção, Matthias Röhrig (2002). Capoeira: The History of an Afro-Brazilian Martial Art. Routledge. ISBN 978-0-7146-8086-6.
- Capoeira, Nestor (2007). The Little Capoeira Book. Blue Snake Books. ISBN 9781583941980.
- Desch-Obi, M. Thomas J. (2008). Fighting for Honor: The History of African Martial Art Traditions in the Atlantic World. Columbia: University of South Carolina Press. ISBN 978-1-57003-718-4.
- Taylor, Gerard (2012). Capoeira 100: An Illustrated Guide to the Essential Movements and Techniques. Blue Snake Books. ISBN 9781583941768.
