= Negativa =

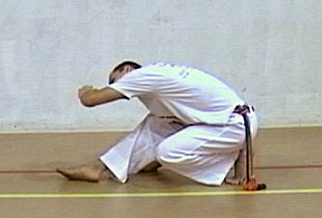
Negativa

Negativa (negative) also negaça (from negar - negate, deny) is an essential move of the capoeira martial art. Negativa is used to negate incoming attacks by going low to the ground .

It is a form of movement on the floor.

== Technique ==
To perform the negativa position, capoeiristas squat on one leg and extend the other leg in front of them. Their supporting hand is placed on the ground on the same side as their extended leg, and their free hand is held up to protect their face.

== Application ==
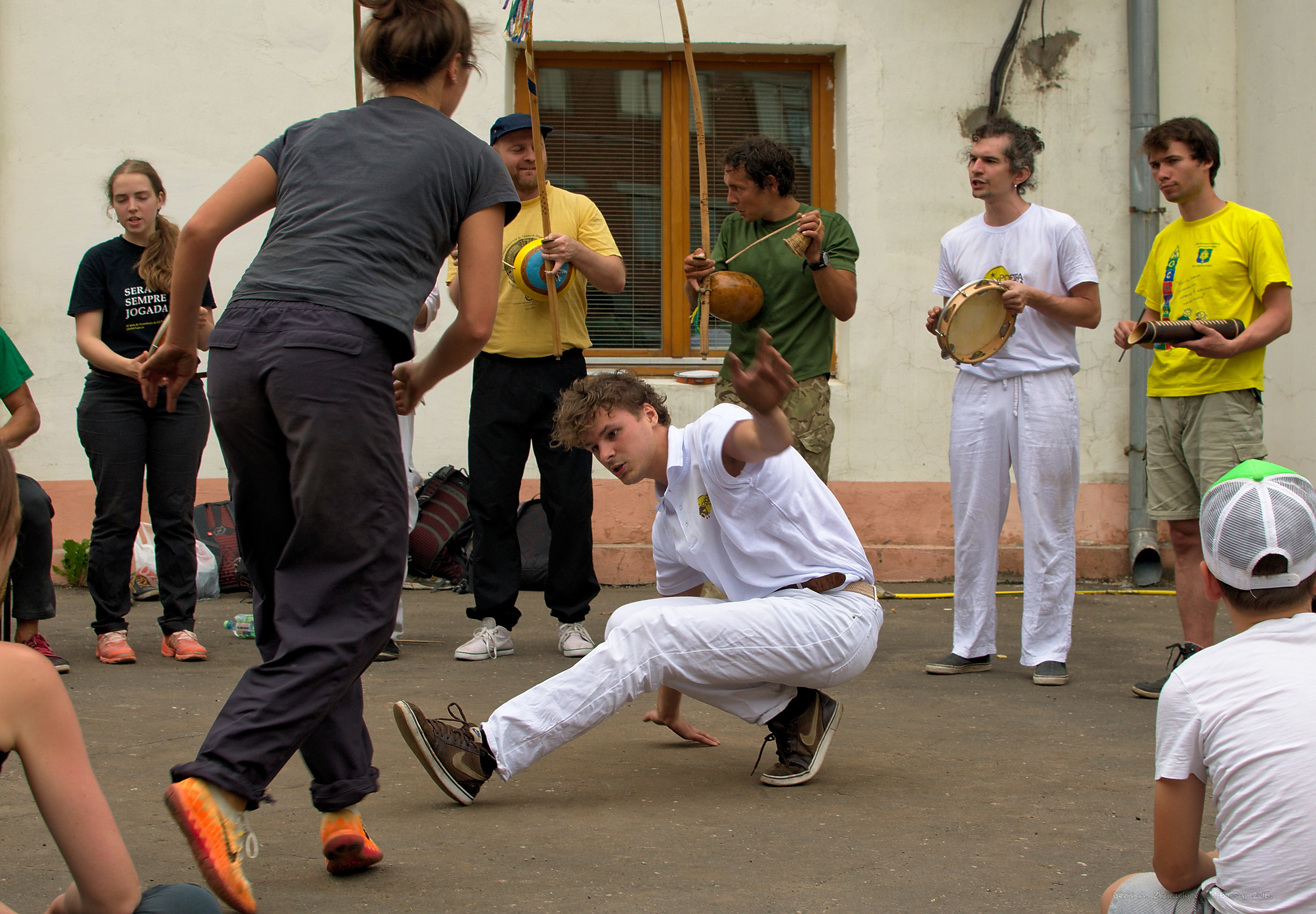
Application of negativa in street capoeira Angola.

It's easy to quickly descend into the negativa. A player who does the negativa skillfully effortlessly evade their opponent's attacks, and always delivers their kicks to the intended part of the opponent's body, with impeccable timing.

Going to the ground is a common tactic in capoeira, and it can be used to both deceive and attack an opponent. An experienced capoeirista can use their ground skills to lure an opponent into a trap, making themselves appear vulnerable when, in reality, they are about to attack. There are many kicks and takedowns specifically designed to be used from the ground.

== Variations ==
=== Negativa derrubando ===
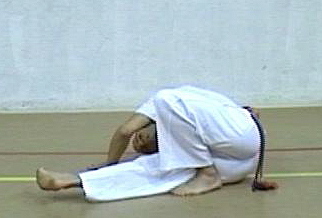
Negativa derrubando

Negativa derrubando used as a foot sweep which involves hooking the opponent's supporting leg.

If the opponent is about to throw a standing kick, they will be putting all of their weight on one leg. This is the perfect opportunity to use your extended leg to hook theirs from behind and sweep them off their feet.

=== Negativa angola ===
Negativa angola, also known as negativa lateral, is low version of negativa, for evading low kicks. This movement is easily achieved by bending one knee, extending the opposite leg, and leaning at the waist while lowering yourself as much as possible.

From low negativa, it easy to transit into rolé or aú de cabeça.

== Literature ==
- Capoeira, Nestor (2002). Capoeira: Roots of the Dance-Fight-Game. Blue Snake Books. ISBN 978-1-58394-637-4.
- Capoeira, Nestor (2007). The Little Capoeira Book. Blue Snake Books. ISBN 9781583941980.
- Taylor, Gerard (2012). Capoeira 100: an Illustrated Guide to the Essential Movements and Techniques. Columbia: Blue Snake Books. ISBN 9781583941768.
- Sharp, Clint (2022). Capoeira: The Ultimate Guide to Capoeira Movements and Techniques for Beginners (Mix Martial Arts). Independently published. ISBN 9798797828051.

== See also ==
- List of capoeira techniques
