= Rasteira =

Capoeira technique

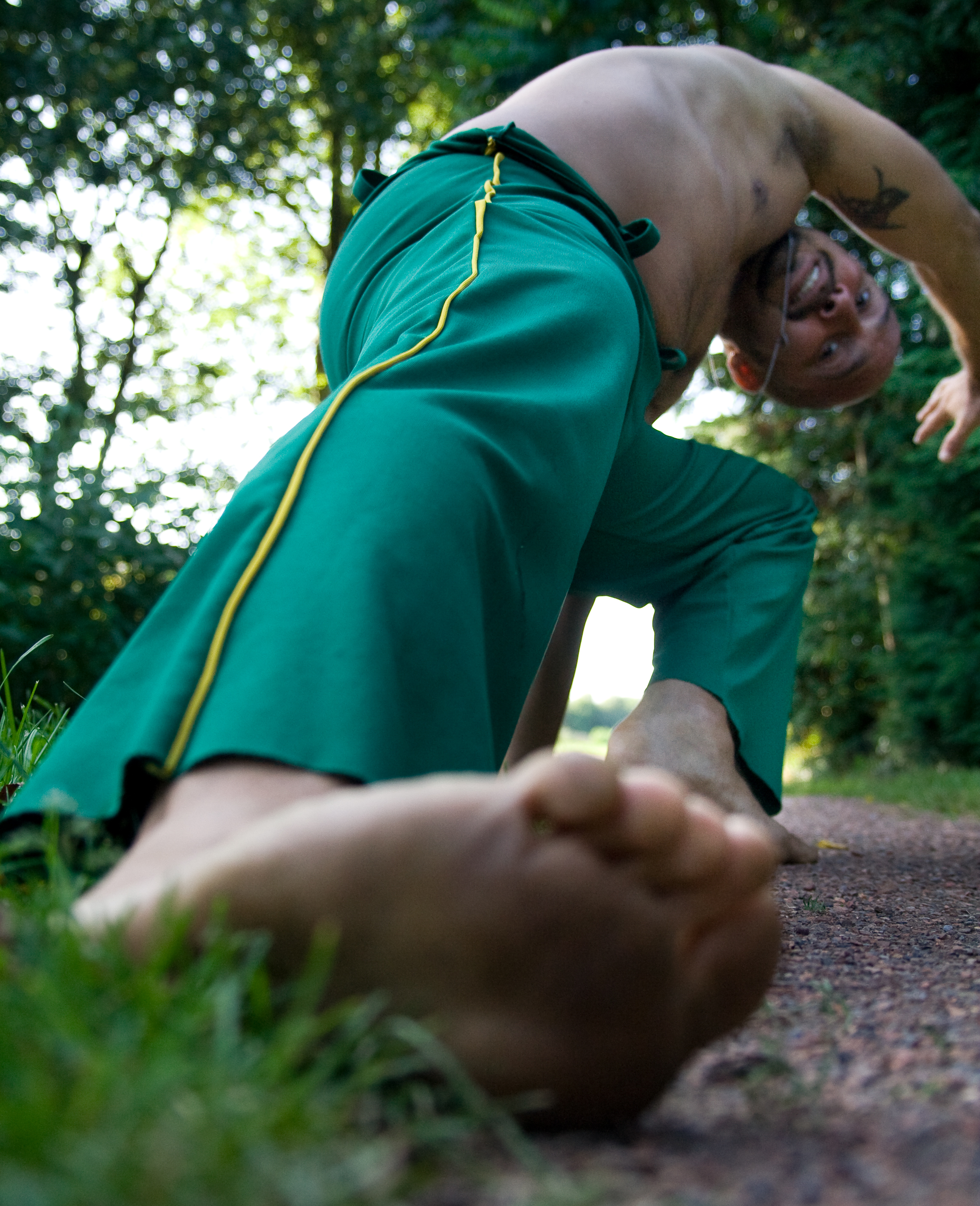
- Rasteira, sweep technique in capoeira.
- Name: Rasteira
- Type: sweep
- Parent style: capoeira Angola
- Parent technique: engolo sweep
- Child technique(s): crouching sweep; back crouching sweep; standing sweep; back standing sweep; grass cutter
- Escapes: jump, kidney fall

Rasteira is a foot sweep technique in capoeira, which usually counters high kicks. It is one of the fundamental techniques in traditional capoeira.

Rasteiras are quick moves that can disrupt the opponent's balance. Instead of meeting the kick with a block, the rasteira follows the same direction of the attack, turning the opponent's force against them. The rasteira takedown is a technique used in capoeira.

Along with meia lua de compasso, rasteira is considered as a trademarks of capoeira. Like many other core capoeira techniques, rasteira was developed within Angolan martial art engolo.

Capoeira sweeps can be done from crouching, standing, front, back, and fall positions.

== Origin ==
The use of well-developed sweep techniques is one of the distinct characteristics of engolo, an Angolan martial art considered the ancestor of capoeira. The traditional engolo sweeps are:

- crouching sweep (okukondjola)
- standing sweep (okukondjola olumbimbi)
- hip checking sweep

Four variations of sweeps were documented during engolo game in the 2010s:

- a rasteira, where one strategically places their instep behind the adversary's standing heel and then pulls or drags forward to disrupt their balance.
- a lateral sweeping kick resembling the capoeira banda, causing the opponent's foot to lift off the ground, leading to a fall.
- a defending sweep against the opponent's rasteira (observed during lessons but rarely used in gameplay).
- a rasteira targeting the opponent's knee.

In Afro-Brazilian batuque game from the 19th century, a range of takedown techniques was used, including rapa, baú, banda lisa, encruzilhada.

== Technique ==
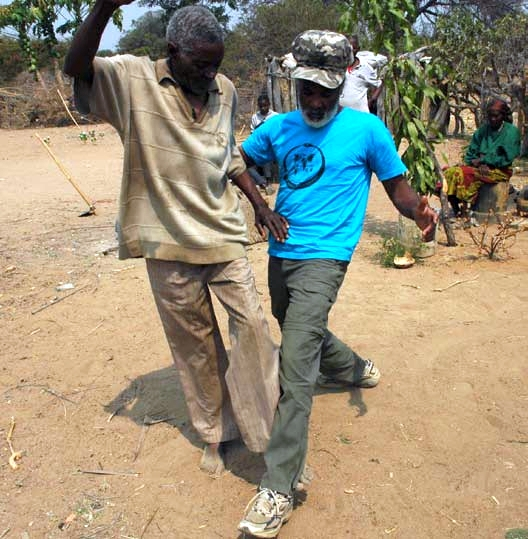
Engolo player Angelino Tchimbundo demonstrates foot sweep on capoeira mestre Cobra Mansa, Angola, 2011.

A player can execute the rasteira while standing or almost lying down.

Typically, the rasteira targets the heel and the outer edge of the opponent's foot. The sweeping foot should be hooked behind the heel or, at most, the ankle of the opponent. If rasteira is delivered any higher, it becomes a kick to the back of the opponent's calf muscle.

Mastering this technique is challenging because it must be executed in the midst of a rapid attack, without any hesitation. Timing is crucial in a rasteira to ensure it contacts behind the opponent's foot. Beginners may strike too early, resulting in painful shin-to-shin collisions.

== Application ==
When you understand the rasteira you are very close to understanding the philosophy behind the art form known as capoeira. [...] The rasteira represents the victory of knowledge over brute force, of shrewdness over strength. It is the weapon of the weak against the strong, of the oppressed against the oppressor.

— Nestor Capoeira

The rasteira takedown is used when the capoeirista is attacked. It is usually performed to a opponent's support leg during kicks such as armada, queixada, martelo, or any other that leaves them on one leg. The capoeirista should perform the rasteira instinctively, simultaneously evading the attack and sweeping the attacker's support leg. A well-executed rasteira typically makes the attacker fall on their back, and if they're not well trained, there's a risk of their head hitting the ground, which can be very dangerous.

Those who master the rasteira and learn to perform it the moment they are attacked will be able to overcome the most violent opponent. The popular proverb applies to rasteira is: "The harder they come, the harder they fall."

Sometimes, in a friendly game, it's enough to feign a rasteira without actually tripping the opponent, stopping it right when it touches the target area. Performing rasteiras to the hands of a person during a handstand or cartwheel is dangerous and can lead to severe injuries, and should be avoided.

== Variations ==
A rasteira can be performed with one, two, or no hands on the ground. The variations of rasteira include:

- crouching sweep (rasteira do chão)
- back crouching sweep (rasteira de costas)
- standing sweep (banda or rasteira em pé)
- back standing sweep (banda de costas)

=== Crouching sweep (rasteira) ===
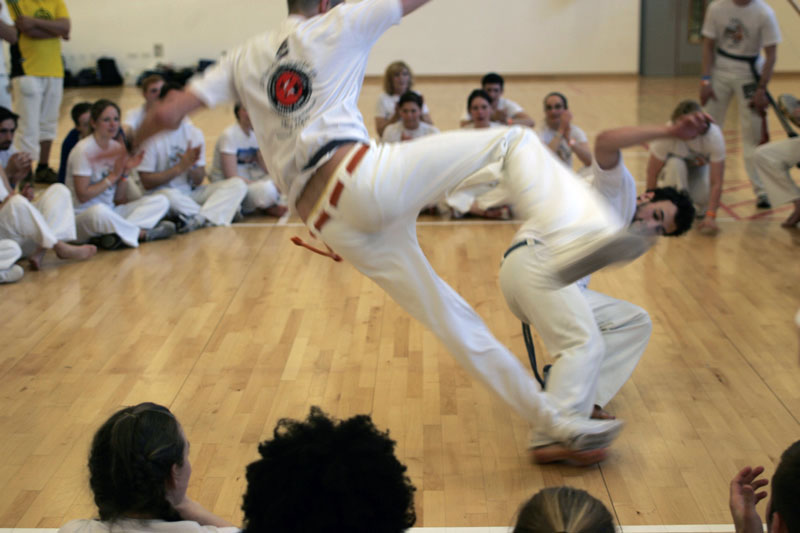
Ground sweep (rasteira no chao)

Crouching sweep, called rasteira (sweep) or rasteira do chão (ground sweep), is the default sweep in capoeira.

To prepare for sweep, the capoeirista suddenly drops to one leg, with their weight on the bent leg and their two arms on either side of the leg for balance. The capoeirista's trunk is bent almost touching the thigh. From this position, the capoeirista extends the opposite leg and touches the ground with the inner edge of the foot.

To launch the sweep, the capoeirista forcefully and rapidly moves the extended leg in a circular trajectory in front of them. When the sweep hits the opponent, the capoeirista tries to hook their foot around the opponent's ankle, leg, or foot to push them over and prevent them from escaping. If the opponent is not quick enough to react, they will fall to the ground.

=== Back crouching sweep (rasteira de costas) ===
Rasteira de costas (back sweep) is a crouching sweep done from the backward rotation. It could be done similar to low meia lua de compasso. The player turns quickly and drops into a squat, sweeping rapidly one leg around to swipe the opponent's leg. Target area is the back of the opponent's ankle. The sweep should be accomplished in less than a second.

Same authors call this sweep encruzilhada (crossroads) and found it in batuque game, while others found the back crouching sweep in ngolo.

=== Standing sweep (rasteira em pé) ===
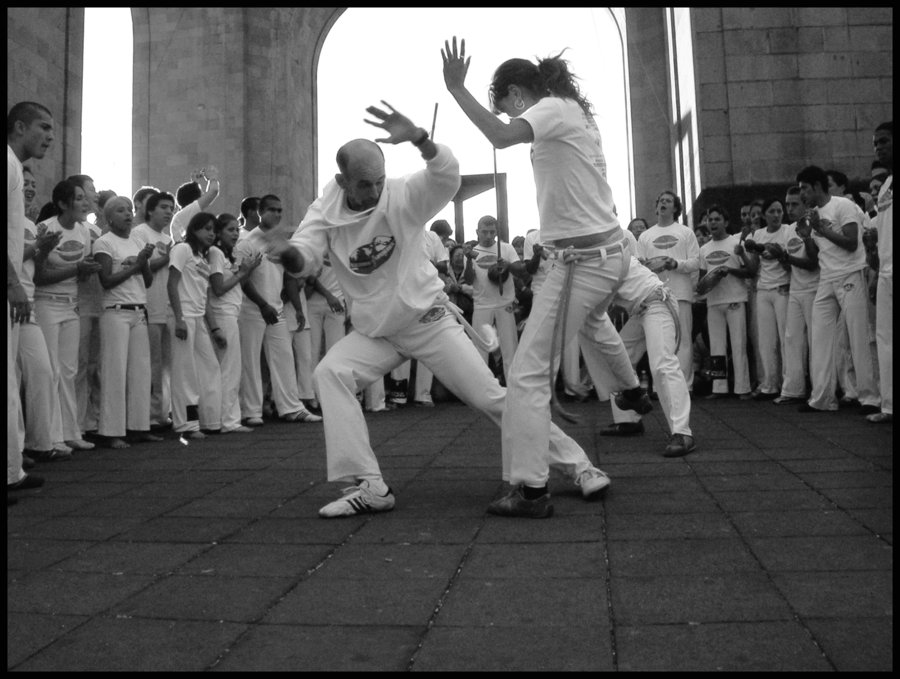
Standing sweep (rasteira em pé)

The standing sweep is often used against martelo or similar direct kicks. It can also be used when the opponent is not attacking, as long as most of their weight is on one leg, but this kind of sweep is rarely successful.

To perform the standing sweep, you first need to position your foot behind the opponent's supporting leg. Then, you twist your body to generate torque and sweep their foot off the ground.

This technique is also known as banda (band) or banda de frente (front band), although it can denote a separate technique. According to Zuma, banda de frente is employed with the assistance of the knee of the attacking leg, so the knee naturally pushes the opponent's legs forward.

=== Back standing sweep (banda de costas) ===
Banda de costas (back band) is a takedown in which the player quickly thrusts forward, lands on one foot, and performs the back sweep. This technique uses the heel of one's foot to sweep the opponent's leg out from under them, causing them to lose their balance and fall.

The back standing sweep is most effective when both of the opponent's legs are swept away, but this can be difficult to achieve unless the opponent is inexperienced or caught off guard. For this reason, this technique is often used as a counter-attack against kicks, such as the queixada and armada, or during other unexpected moments in a game.

=== Grass cutter (corta-capim) ===
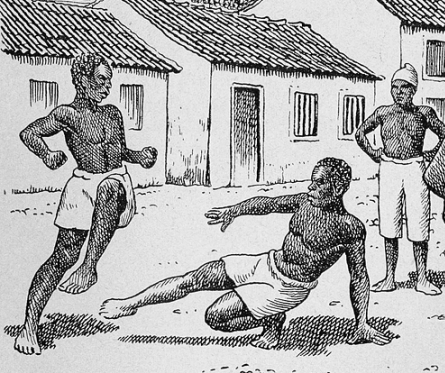
A detail from the 19th-century engraving showing corta-capim capoeira technique.

Corta-capim (grass cutter) is a foot sweep delivered in a very specific way. This technique was almost always used in an unequal fight, where one person faces multiple opponents.

If standing, the capoeirista suddenly lowers their body to one leg, and by extending the other leg, made it to rotate violently. From queda de quatro, the fighter extends one leg and sweeps it in a semi-circle across the space where the opponent's foot is planted. Similar to a rasteira, the attacking foot also aims to lock onto the opponent's foot to execute better takedowns.

As a child, João Grande saw some guys doing corta capim in the street, and heard: "Do that movement to a person and the person will fall." That sparked his lifelong interest in capoeira.

This takedown of old capoeira is used mostly as a floreo today.

=== Crossroads (encruzilhada) ===
Encruzilhada (crossroads) is a low takedown from the queda de quatro position. To execute this move, the capoeirista crosses one leg in front of the standing opponent. Then, they drop their body completely backward, taking the opponent in a strong sweep that causes them to fall to the side.

Securing the opponent's foot, heel, or leg is necessary to begin the pull that creates the imbalance.

== See also ==
- Capoeira
- List of capoeira techniques

== Literature ==
- Burlamaqui, Anibal (1928). Gymnástica nacional (capoeiragem), methodisada e regrada. Rio de Janeiro.
- Da Costa, Lamartine Pereira (1961). Capoeiragem, a arte da defesa pessoal brasileira. Rio de Janeiro: Oficial da Marinha.
- Pastinha, Mestre (1988). Capoeira Angola. Fundação Cultural do Estado da Bahia.
- Assunção, Matthias Röhrig (2002). Capoeira: The History of an Afro-Brazilian Martial Art. Routledge. ISBN 978-0-7146-8086-6.
- Capoeira, Nestor (2007). The Little Capoeira Book. Blue Snake Books. ISBN 9781583941980.
- Desch-Obi, M. Thomas J. (2008). Fighting for Honor: The History of African Martial Art Traditions in the Atlantic World. Columbia: University of South Carolina Press. ISBN 978-1-57003-718-4.
- Taylor, Gerard (2012). Capoeira 100: An Illustrated Guide to the Essential Movements and Techniques. Blue Snake Books. ISBN 9781583941768.
