= Heggstad =

Heggstad may refer to:

== People ==
- Leiv Heggstad (1879–1954), Norwegian educator, linguist and translator
- Olav Heggstad (1877–1954), Norwegian civil engineer

== Other ==
- Estate of Heggstad, 1993 California legal case
- Heggstad Church, church in Norway

== See also ==
- Hægstad
