= Magnus Bernhardsen =

Norwegian literary science major and activist

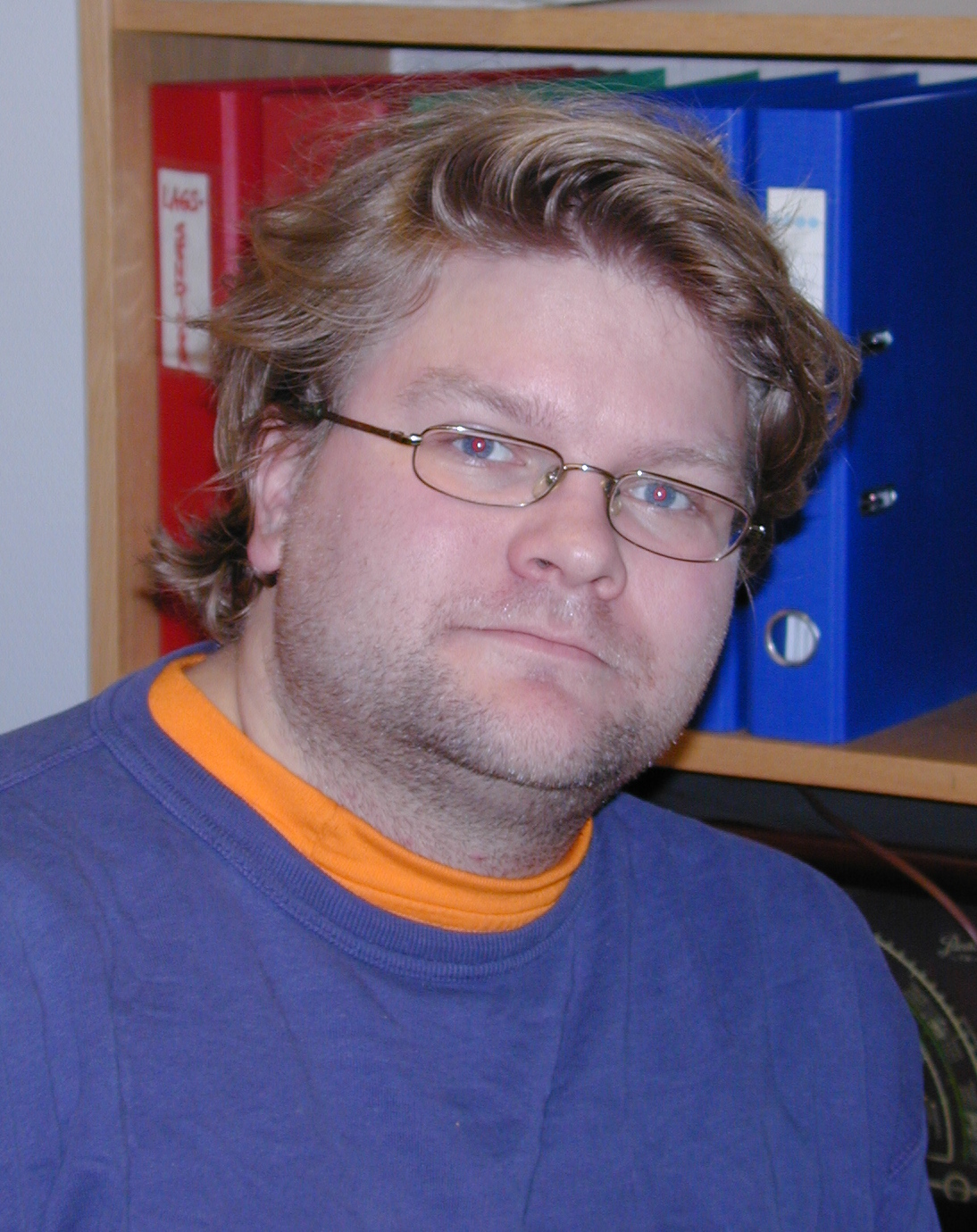
Image of Magnus Bernhardsen

Magnus Bernhardsen (born 1976) is a Norwegian literary science major and activist. He was president for Norsk Målungdom from 1998 to 2000 and has after that has had leadership roles in Noregs Mållag. He was the president for the Norwegian skeptic association Skepsis Norge from 2014 to 2016.

In 2019 Bernhardsen received a master's degree in Nordic literature from the University of Oslo.

In 1995 he wrote the booklet Biji Kurdistan together with Lars Juhlin (published by Red Youth) after a reportage trip to Kurdistan.
