= Hartvig (given name) =

Hartvig is a given name. Notable people with the given name include:

- Hartvig Caspar Christie (politician) (1893–1959), Norwegian politician
- Hartvig Sverdrup Eckhoff (1855–1928), Norwegian architect
- Hartvig Marcus Frisch (1754–1816), Danish businessman
- Hartvig Jentoft (1693–1739), Norwegian tradesman and sailor
- Hartvig Johannson (1875–1957), Norwegian businessman
- Hartvig Kiran (1911–1978), Norwegian author, lyricist and composer
- Hartvig Krummedige (died 1476), Danish nobleman
- Hartvig Lassen (1824–1897), Norwegian editor, educator and literary historian
- Hartvig Andreas Munthe (1845–1905), Norwegian military officer, engineer and genealogist
- Hartvig Nielsen (1908–1997), Danish chess player
- Hartvig Nissen (1815–1874), Norwegian philologist and educator
- Hartvig Nissen (gymnast) (1857–1924), Norwegian gymnast
- Hartvig Philip Rée (1778–1859), Danish merchant and author
- Hartvig Asche von Schack (1644–1692), North German nobleman
- Hartvig Svendsen (1902–1971), Norwegian politician

== See also ==
- Hartvig (disambiguation)
- Hartvig (surname)
