= NMU =

NMU or nmu may refer to:

== Education ==
- Northern Michigan University, a public university in Marquette, Michigan, US
- Nelson Mandela University, a public university in Port Elizabeth, South Africa
- National Mining University of Ukraine, now Dnipro University of Technology
- Nishtar Medical University, in Multan, Punjab, Pakistan
- North Maharashtra University, Maharashtra, India

== Organizations ==
- National Maritime Union, a former American labor union
- National Miners' Union (1928–35), American affiliate of the Red International of Labour Unions
- Norsk Målungdom (Youth league of Noregs Mållag)

== Other uses ==
- N-Nitroso-N-methylurea, an alkylating agent
- Neuromedin U (NmU or NMU), a neuropeptide
- Maidu language (ISO 639: nmu)
