= Brunstad =

Brunstad may refer to:

- Brunstad Christian Church
- Brunstad Conference Center

== People with the surname ==
- Endre Brunstad (born 1967), Norwegian linguist
