= Hægstad =

Hægstad is a Norwegian surname. Notable people with the surname include:

- Erik Hægstad (born 1996), Norwegian cyclist
- Marius Hægstad (1850–1927), Norwegian educator, linguist and politician

== See also ==
- Heggstad (disambiguation)
