= Hannås Collection of Scandinavian Books =

The British Library Hannås Collection of Scandinavian Books is a collection of over 700 items of Scandinavian literature created by antiquarian bookseller Torgrim Hannås and donated to the British Library in 1984.

== Background ==
Torgrim Hannås (28 August 1916 – 20 November 1998) was a Norwegian linguist, intelligence officer and antiquarian bookseller. His father, Torleiv Hannaas, was a book collector and professor at the University Museum of Bergen. In 1957, Torgrim and his wife Linda Saunders (née Morris) began selling books in Bromley as T. & L. Hannas, becoming specialists in Scandinavian literature and 18th-century English literature. The business moved to Winchester in 1984, and had its last sale in 1993.

== Collection overview ==
In 1984, Hannås donated part of his collection to the British Library. After removing several hundred duplicates, they accepted 720 items, with 235 dating from before 1801. The collection is mostly made up of dictionaries, linguistic textbooks, linguistic monographs and phrasebooks. Items in the collection include:

- A copy of the first English-Norwegian dictionary.
- A pocket phrasebook in four languages (German, Polish, Latvian and Swedish), printed in Riga and issued to the Swedish army during the Great Northern War in 1705.
