= Burlamaqui =

Burlamaqui may also refer to:

- Jean-Jacques Burlamaqui
- Anibal Burlamaqui
