= Islandsmoen =

Islandsmoen is a surname. Notable people with the surname include:

- Olaus Islandsmoen (1873–1949), Norwegian educator, museologist, and politician
- Sigurd Islandsmoen (1881–1964), Norwegian composer, brother of Olaus
