= Steinulf Tungesvik =

Norwegian jurist and politician

Steinulf Tungesvik (born 24 December 1965) is a Norwegian jurist and politician for the Centre Party.

The son of Hans Olav Tungesvik, Steinulf Tungesvik grew up in Skånevik Municipality. He took the Postal College from 1984 to 1989, was a consultant in the Postal Service from 1989 to 1993, and graduated from the University of Oslo with a cand.jur. degree in 1994. From 1993 to 1997 he worked as secretary for the Centre Party parliamentary group. He has worked as a lawyer since 2000.

During Bondevik's First Cabinet he was appointed State Secretary in the Ministry of Social Affairs and Health. He was the chairman of Noregs Mållag briefly in 2005, resigning to become State Secretary for the second time, this time in the Ministry of Transport and Communications as a part of Stoltenberg's Second Cabinet. He resigned in February 2008 to become leader of the Centre Party regional chapter in Hordaland. He later returned briefly as acting State Secretary from February to April 2012.

Cultural offices
Preceded by Nils T. Ulvund	Leader of Noregs Mållag; 2005	Succeeded by Endre Otto Brunstad
