= Slapgard =

Slapgard is a Norwegian surname. Notable people with the surname include:

- Bjarne Slapgard (1901–1997), Norwegian educator and author
- Sigrun Slapgard (born 1953), Norwegian journalist and non-fiction writer
