= Hartvig =

Hartvig may refer to:

- Hartvig (given name)
- Hartvig (surname)
