= Capoeira carioca =

Street fighting version of the Brazilian martial art

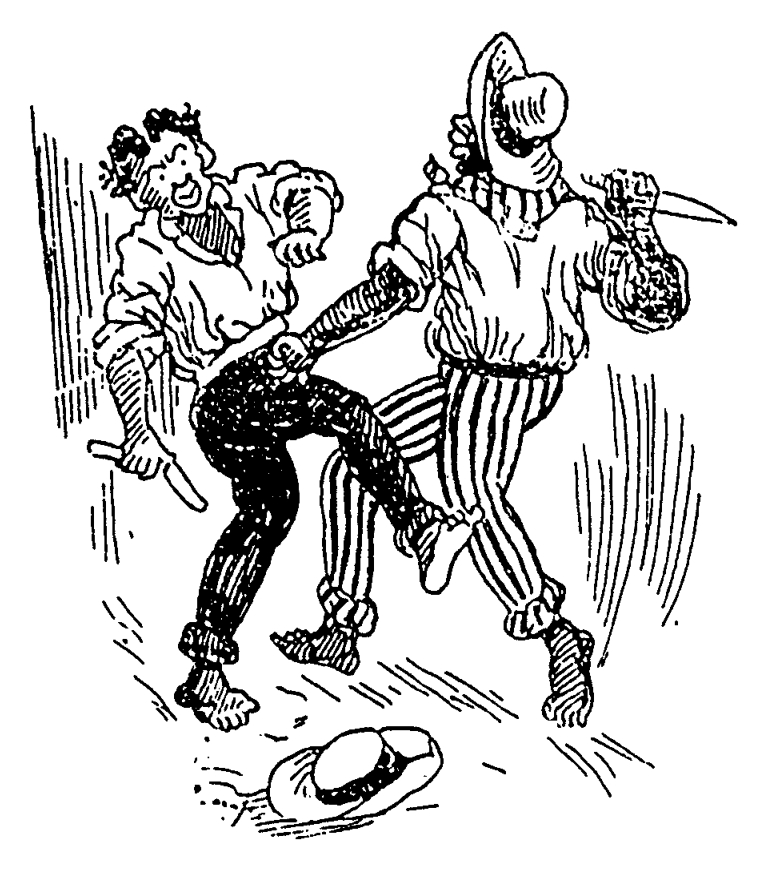
Fight between two capoeiras (1925)

Capoeira carioca was a street fighting version of capoeira that existed in Rio de Janeiro during the 19th century. In capoeira carioca, all available means were used, including various types of weapons, such as knives, straight razors, clubs and machetes. Capoeira from this period is also known as capoeiragem and its practitioners were referred to as capoeiras.

Rio de Janeiro was the epicentre of capoeira in the 19th century. In the early 19th century, it transmitted primarily among black slaves born in Portuguese Angola. Africans were massively present in the Rio, performing their games, celebrations, festivals. They formed their capoeira maltas, slaves "fraternal paramilitary organizations" that defended the neighborhoods.

As of the mid-19th century, capoeira was increasingly detached from its music and dancing and was essentially a criminal activity. After the Paraguayan War (1865–1870), the capoeiras became involved in politics. By the late 19th century, capoeirista demographics in Rio had changed significantly, with the majority being free Creoles (blacks born in Brazil), mixed, and whites.

The widespread violent capoeira practice in Rio de Janeiro led to a nationwide ban on capoeira. After the ban in 1890 and the subsequent mass arrests of capoeira groups, this style of capoeira was believed to be presumed extinct yet to this day is still practiced in Rio de Janeiro. Contemporary capoeira comes from the traditional capoeira Angola, preserved in Bahia.

== Background ==
In the early 19th century, newcomers to Rio de Janeiro might mistake it for an African town. Roughly two-thirds of Rio's population had African ancestry, as nearly 80 percent of them originated from Angola. The enslaved population, initially 12,000 in 1808 (about 20% of the urban population), rapidly expanded to over 36,000 by 1821, constituting roughly 45% of the city's residents.

In 1808 prince Dom João VI, along with the royal court, moved to Rio de Janeiro. Due to city growth, more slaves were brought to manufactures. Urban slaves lived without direct supervision, and their main duty was to bring money to their master. Africans were very present in public, with frequent dances, festivals and processions. Many of their activities, such as capoeira, African religions and batuque, were suppressed and persecuted. The head of new Royal Police Guard, major Vidigal, notorious persecutor of capoeristas, was an excellent capoerista himself.

== History ==
Capoeira was practiced in closed societies of enslaved Africans, although colonial authorities punished it harshly. The term capoeira is first mentioned in 1789, as "the gravest of crimes", in a judicial record reporting how a young man Adão was severely punished with 500 lashings for being capoeira:

A fight had occurred between capoeiras, and one of them had been murdered. According to the law of the kingdom, the gravest of crimes was the practice of capoeiragem [...] Adão was innocent regarding the murder charge, but his status as a capoeira was confirmed. As punishment he was to receive five hundred lashes and two years in public works.

— A judicial record from 1789.

In capoeira groups, known as maltas, the knowledge of the capoeira was preserved and transmitted.

=== A violent slave game ===
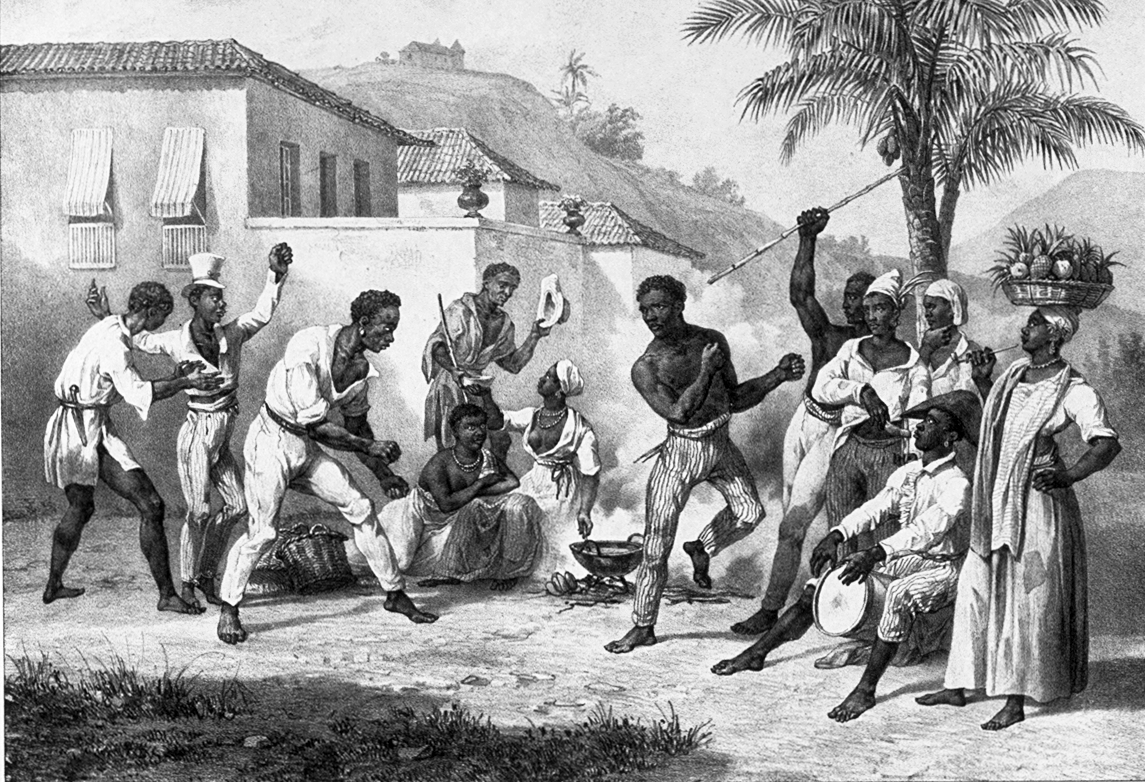
Playing capoeira or war dance, Rio de Janeiro, between 1822 and 1824, by Rugendas

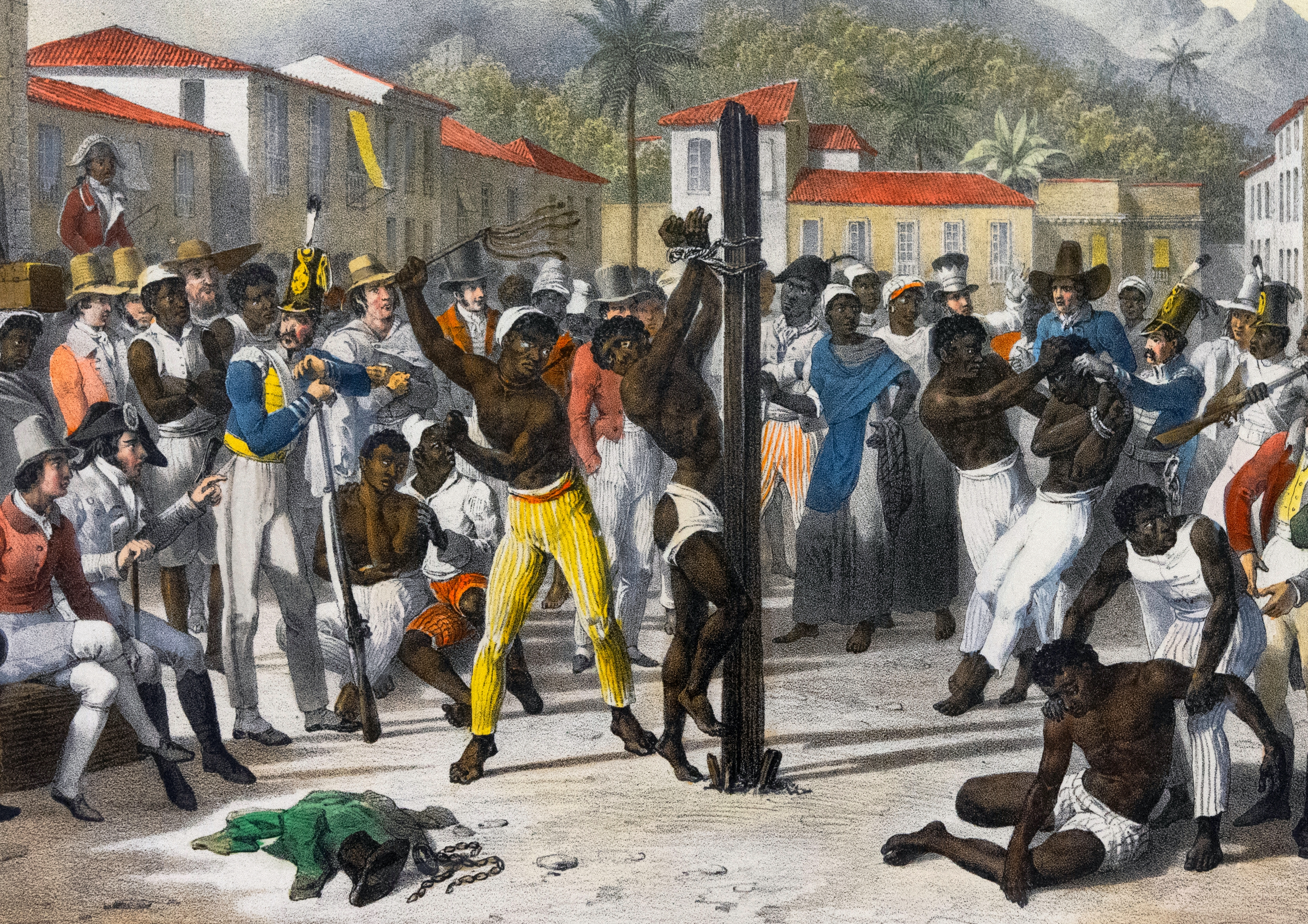
Public lashing of Negroes in Santa Ana Square, between 1822 and 1824, by Rugendas.

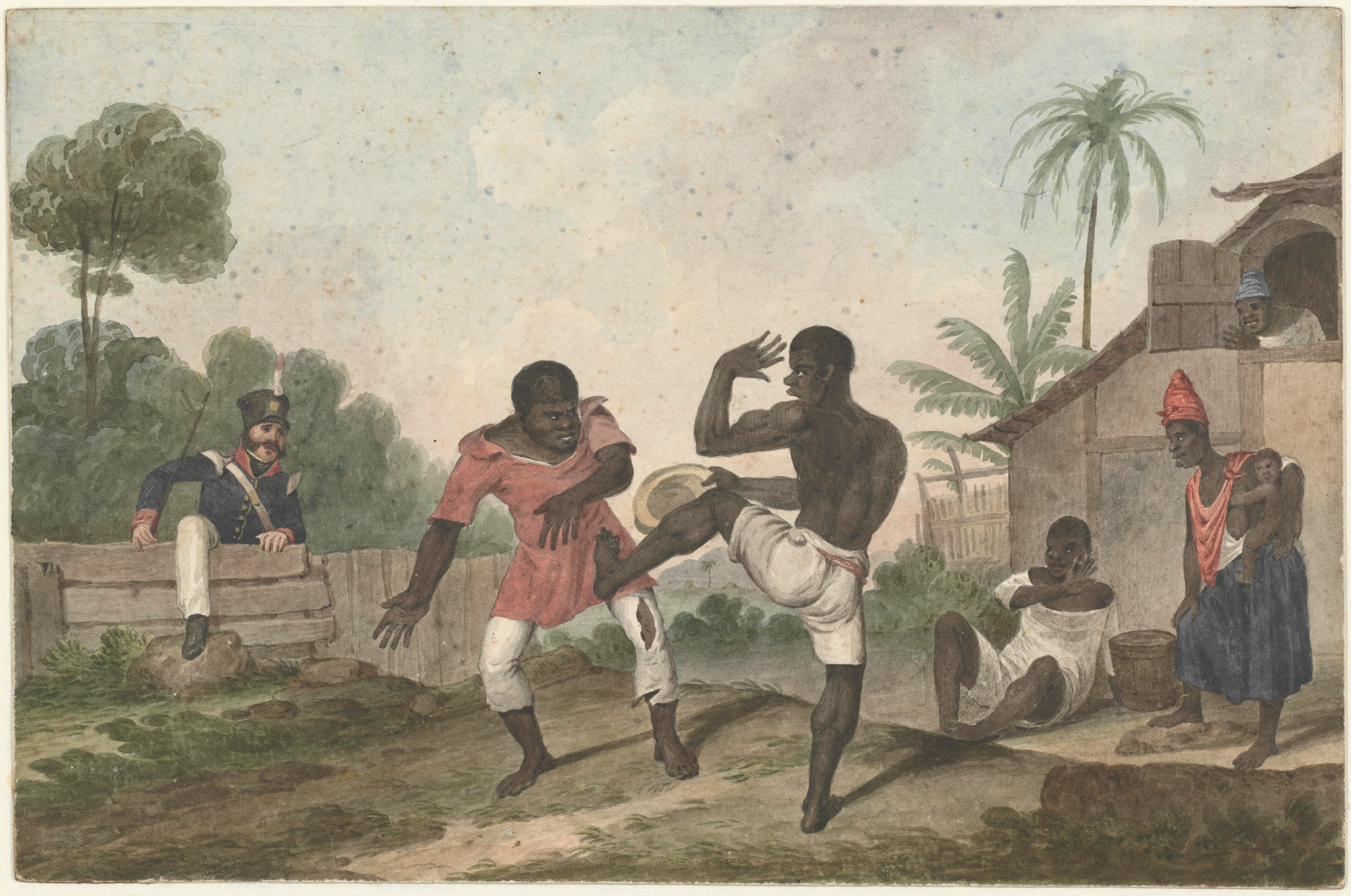
Capoeira, Brazils, by Augustus Earle, c. 1822, depicting an illegal capoeira in Rio de Janeiro

On December 13, 1811, a capoeira group assaulted the police (Corpo de Permanentes). These capoeiras, armed with knives, intended to forcefully take from the jail guards one of their arrested comrades.

Between 1812 and 1814 Rio's capoeira saw a dramatic rise in razor use, from under five cases in 1812 to about forty in 1814. On September 30, 1812, the slave Pedro Benguela, was arrested for playing capoeira with a razor in Carioca square and sentenced to 100 lashes. In January 1813, three more capoeira players were charged: one received 200 lashes, another 50 lashes, and the third 200 lashes.

In March 1814 the police chef saw violent capoeiras in the street, in the time where the prince João was passing by. They were "with knives and sticks and with the ribbons they sometimes use to come out, causing great mayhem and shouting".

It seems that typical capoeira garments of that period included a hat and colored ribbons. Many arrested capoeiras wore colored ribbons, especially yellow and red, associated with Kongo/Angola religions. On December 13, 1814, two African slaves were arrested for playing capoeira and wearing colored ribbons. The African slave Bernardo Moçambique was arrested on March 14, 1815, for "playing capoeira, possessing a razor, and tying a red ribbon to a pole." Three days later, the enslaved African João Congo, was arrested for playing capoeira and for possessing a cane, a knife, and ribbons. They also commonly wear hats or caps. These items may have signified their ethnic identity, but it's unclear if they indicated gang affiliation.

In 1816 police reported that black capoeiras, especially in Direita Street, causing disturbances and engaging in stone-throwing during their games in the city.

On July 25, 1817, two capoeiristas, José Benguela and Joaquim Augusto, were arrested, with one in possession of a sharp knife (faca de ponta) and the other carrying a saber (estoque). In 1817, the police declared strict penalties for possession of knives, and the same for those "whistling and with sticks", including 300 lashes (for slaves only) and three months of forced labor:

The same penalty will apply to all those who roam around the city, whistling and with sticks, committing disorder most of the times with no aim, and which are well known by the name of capoeiras, even if they do not provoke any injuries or death or any other crime […]

Whistling was the way capoeiristas signaled each other. In 1817 one officer required the arrest of "all the negros and mulattos" that "entertain themselves in capoeiragem games" in seven different locations in the city.

On February 4, 1818, five slaves playing capoeira were captured with a straight razors. In the same year, another African slave was arrested for playing capoeira and "wearing a white straw hat with a big yellow and red ribbon tied to its crown."

On January 15, 1819, the slave Alexander Mozambique was jailed for practicing capoeira and given a three-month sentence with 300 lashes. On November 25, 1819, the slave José Angola was arrested for playing capoeira and was recognized as a capoeira leader.

On January 3, 1820, the slave Joaquim Angola was arrested for possessing a razor and a "capoeira club". On March 20, 1820, Bernardo Mina was arrested, but his friend Estanislao tried to resist the arrest, calling on his capoeira comrades for help. They threw stones at the patrol and encircled it in an unsuccessful attempt to free the capoeiristas. On February 28, 1820, slaves Francisco Rebolo and José Ganguela were arrested "for being in a gathering of capoeiras and wearing red hats — a capoeira symbol."

In January 1821 the slave Ignácio Mossange played capoeira with a razor and was sentenced to 300 lashes and three months in the penitentiary. In December 1821, following "six deaths and many knife wounds", the Military committee demanded publicly and firmly punishing of arrested black capoeiras, caught by the military school, and opposed their release, pressured by slave owners. Between 1810 and 1821, out of 4,853 arrests, 438 were capoeira-related. On February 6, 1822, Emperor Pedro I pledged four days leave to any soldier who caught a capoeirista.

Between 1822 and 1824 the German painter Johann Moritz Rugendas described capoeira game:

Two contestants face each other, each trying to butt his adversary in the chest with his head and knock the opponent down. They turn cartwheels and pause as they launch into an attack. Sometimes they stand like he-goats, butting at each other. The game often turns into a wild brawl when knives are drawn and blood is shed.

— Johann Moritz Rugendas

On April 17, 1824, martial arts were used to rescue captured quilombo members on the outskirts of Rio City. Resolution from August 30, 1824, ordered arrested black capoeiras to work on the dam instead of being flogged. By December 1824, police reported large disruptions by black capoeiras on Sundays and holidays, leading to stabbings, injuries, and thefts.

=== Suppression of the mercenary revolt ===
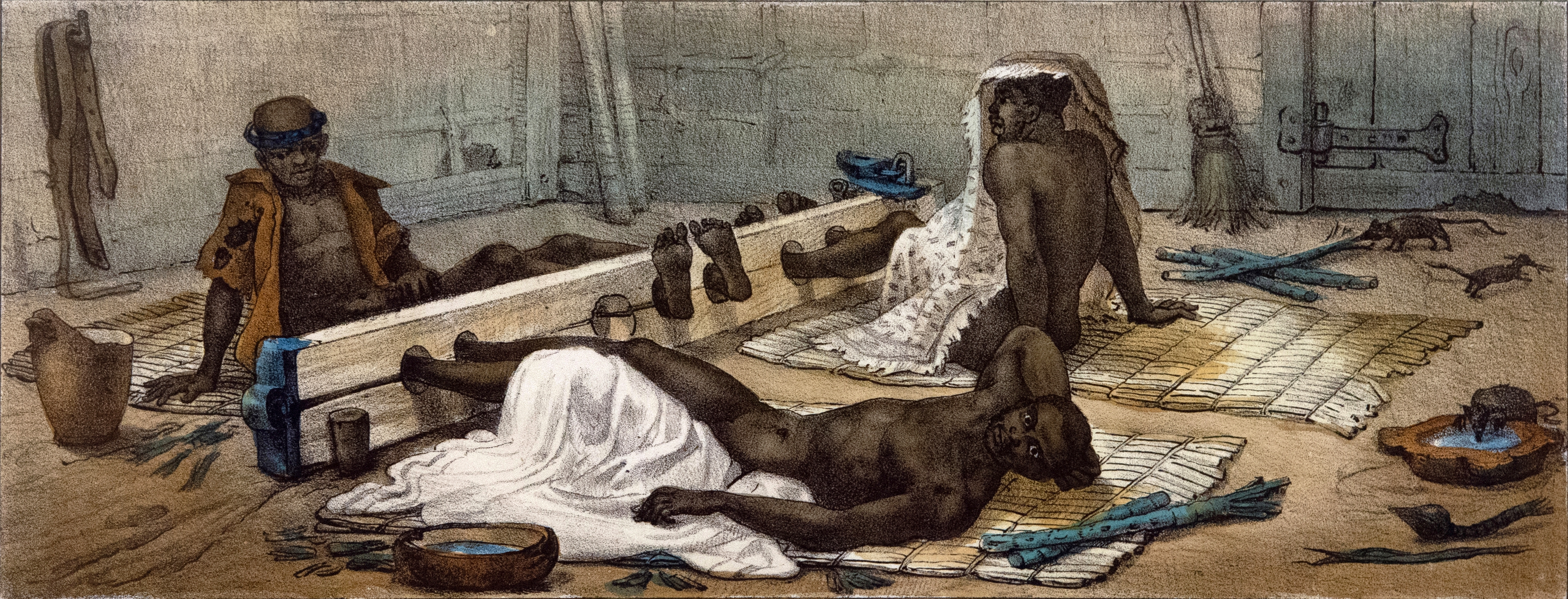
Negros in prison, circa 1830, by Debret.

In June 1828 the revolt of German and Irish mercenaries broke out. They advanced toward King's palace, sparking citywide riots by June 10. While the tradition suggests that major Vidigal called upon the capoeiras, they may simply have taken the chance to fight the foreign whites during the chaos. One of the eyewitnesses wrote:

Many Germans in São Cristovão managed to assemble in one location. Those who didn't were confronted by a group of black capoeiras and engaged in deadly combat. Even when stationed and armed with rifles, the rebels couldn't withstand the fists, stones, and sticks. They fell in the streets and public squares, either wounded or dead.

A German observer asserted that slaves gained five decades' worth of confidence in just three days, sensing their newfound power. After the mutiny was suppressed, Police Commissioner issued an edict prohibiting all blacks, especially slaves, from using any kind of weapon.

In 1829 law limited the number of lashes for a slave to fifty per day. However, exceptions were made for two major threats to the system: quilombolas and capoeiras, who were publicly whipped at pillars in Campo de Santana squares as a deterrent.

Few edicts were issued in 1830 to regulate undesirable African activities, including gatherings, games, rituals, nudity and capoeira:

especially those prohibiting slave gatherings or participation in funerals with superstitious rites that involve crowding, depraved actions, and lewd verbal expressions. These orders also cover prohibitions against crowding and games in taverns, streets, and public squares, as well as regulations regarding slave nudity or littering in the squares and streets. Additionally, they address matters related to capoeiras and the searching of slaves to prevent the use of weapons and sticks.

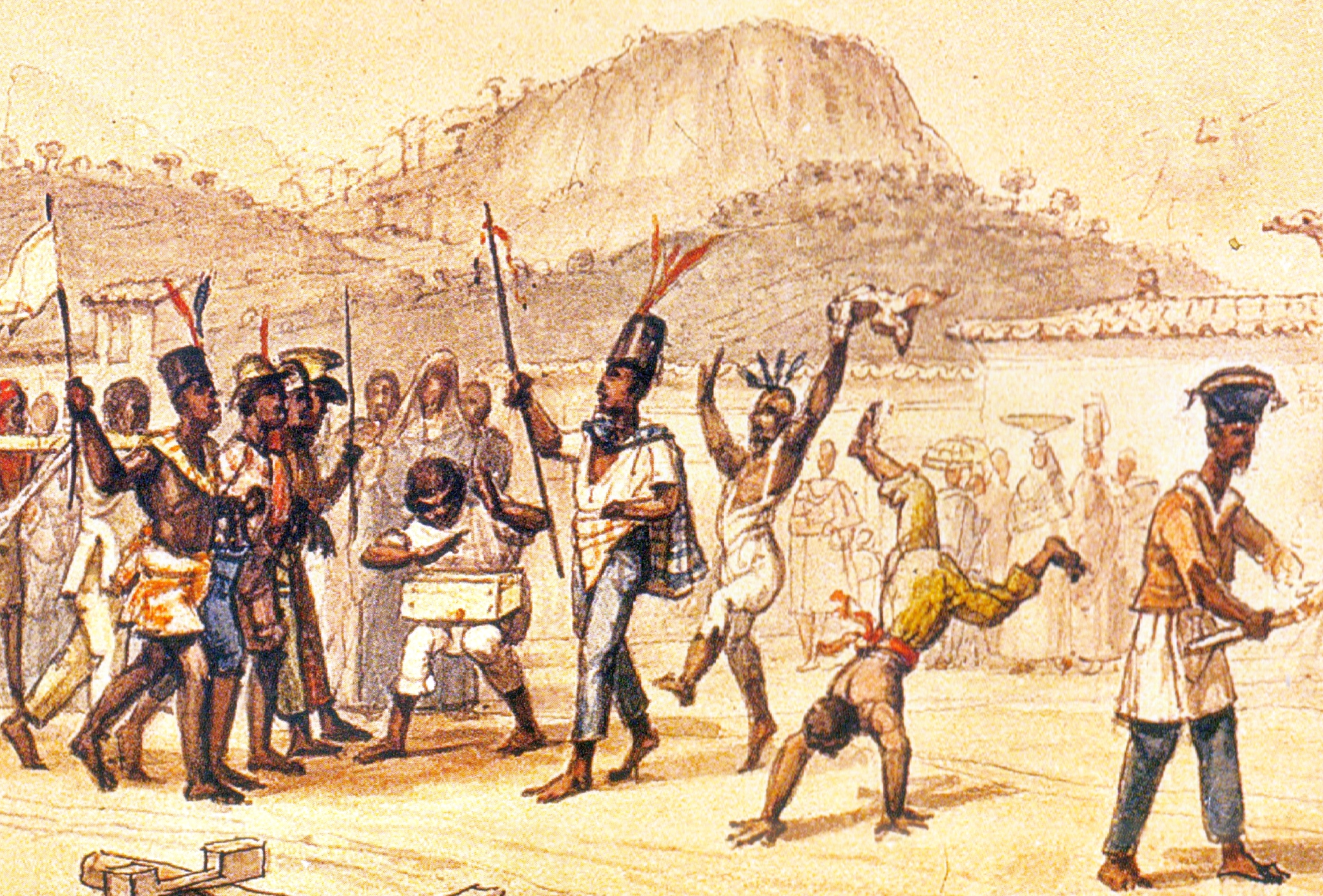
A Funeral Procession for the Son of a Black King, by Debret c. 1835 (detail)

On July 26, 1831, multiple capoeira groups, organized into the unit of more than 200 "blacks and mulattoes", attacked the municipal guard patrol, composed of men of status, targeting their chief. They engaged in a battle in the Catete suburb, stoning the patrol leader. Afterwards, they split into the distinct factions and dispersed in opposite directions. The reason of attack is unknown, but they were likely seeking revenge for some perceived injustice. This incident implies high level of organization within the capoeira groups. The following day, the Police Inspector General recommended training and authorizing loyal citizens to use firearms in assisting the police in apprehending capoeiras and other criminals. Soon after, the National Guard was founded.

On November 16, 1832, the police inspector reported that black capoeiras and similar individuals conceal spears and weapons in marimbas, sugarcanevpieces, and small black whip handles made locally.

In June 1833 Rio de Janeiro's Police Chief expressed concern about capoeiras' audacity, leading to stone-throwing incidents in Campo de Santana. On November 18, 1833, two black men were stabbed to death, and two wounded reported assaults by capoeiras.

=== Increase in capoeira violence ===
I did not study to be a priest
Neither to be a doctor
I did study capoeira
To beat up the [police] inspector
(Capoeira song from XIX century Rio)

Around the 1840s authorities noticed changes within the capoeira community, leading to new terminology. The terms "capoeira slaves" and "black capoeiras" were replaced with "capoeiras" and "capoeira groups." These groups were well and hierarchically organized.

From the 1840s most capoeira offenders were sent to the navy. On March 3, 1842, the police commissioner wrote to the admiral that the sending of five capueristas to the navy may cause a great revolt:

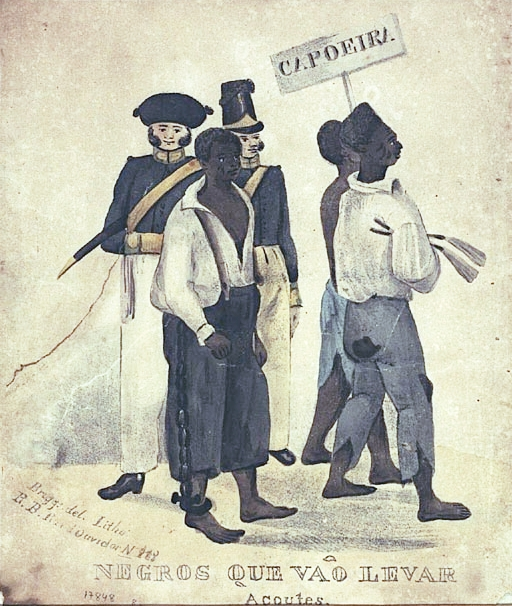
Capoeira negroes going to be whipped, by Briggs, c. 1840.

I send your Lordship the following men, and request that they be drafted for service in the navy: Feliciano Francisco, laborer; Inácio Viegas Tourinho, chicken peddler; Francisco Peçanha, chicken peddler; Emigídio Marcus, laborer; and Domingos Antônio Pereira, daily laborer—all black Minas—who live in a densely populated area. This may have triggered a sudden very large gathering of capoeiras, which necessitated police intervention. I believe it would be best to separate these men and offer them a different future.

On May 14, 1847, the commander of the Campo de Santana quarter, saw four capoeiras came running, waving knives and chasing a black man who was fleeing and "whistling with all his might". After they reached the border of the neighborhood, the chase stopped. In June 1849, a police patrol had trouble to arrest two capoeiras who resisted arrest with blows. After arresting them, the patrol was surrounded by their comrades stoning them.

In Rio, since 1850, Creoles, born in Brazil to African slave parents and native Portuguese speakers, began to emerge. Free Creoles and whites eventually became the capoeira gang leaders. By mid-century murder and injuries became more prevalent in the war for territory.

As per Filho, leadership status was attained only by those "whose bravery could not be overcome". Reverend James Fletcher, who visited Rio during the 1850s, characterized capoeira leaders as those with the most people killed. In 1853, the police commissioner wrote to the minister of justice about the recent mass murder in the Santa Anna parish:

It is interesting that the reason for these crimes is not revenge or robbery but the pleasure of seeing blood flow. The perpetrators say that the wish to try the metal makes them commit these acts of violence. They are commonly known as capoeiras. In the course of one afternoon in February, these scoundrels murdered seven people in the Santa Ana district.

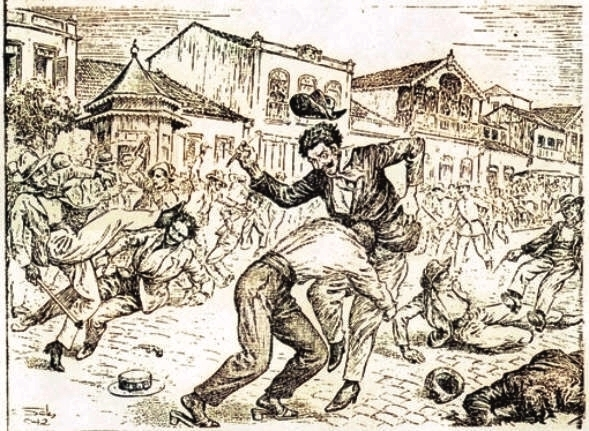
An engraving showing Manduca da Praia in the midst of a street battle of capueristas in Rio.

In 1857 Kidder and Fletcher described capoeiras as "members of some sort of secret society, where all the glory goes to whoever destroys the most lives". On January 19, 1859, Minister of Justice stated that the capoeiras use the festival days for their "runs," commit crimes, and intentionally frighten peaceful citizens. The folklorist Mello Moraes describes how capoeiras violently interrupted public events in the mid-19th century Rio:

Sometimes, interrupting the course of a procession, or the pace of a parade, one could hear, jointly with screams of the ladies fleeing in terror, of negras carrying the young master in their arms, of fathers seeking refuge for their wife and children, the horrendous ‘Shut down! Shut down’. The caxinguelés [capoeira apprentices] flew at the front, capoeiragem exploded without restraints, and the mayhem resulted in broken heads, shattered light posts, stabbings and deaths.

Some capoeiras were employed in public agencies such as the police, the fire brigade, the National Guard. On January 19, 1859, the minister complained that in their spare time many soldiers took off their uniforms and trained capoeira. In 1859, the police commissioner requested the dismissal of the violent caporeista Felisberto do Amaral from the National Guard:

The man is very dangerous and is known as the head of the capoeiras who meet in the Santa Rita neighborhood. It was he who threw a stone and wounded policeman Lúcio Feliciano da Costa in the head in the course of pursuing a capoeira group.

Police data from the mid-19th century shows that capoeira was the main reason for the arrests:

"From 288 slaves that entered the Calabouço jail during the years 1857 and 1858, 80 (31%) were arrested for capoeira, and only 28 (10.7%) for running away. Out of 4,303 arrests in Rio police jail in 1862, 404 detainees—nearly 10%—had been arrested for capoeira."

Standard punishment for imprisoned capoeiras were whipping (for slaves only) and forced labour in the dockyards.

=== Paraguayan War (1864–1870) ===
Many capoeiras had been sent into the Paraguayan War (1864–1870) and were promised freedom and privileges in return. The police used recruitment to clean the city of capoeiras.

Capoeira battalions were made up of capoeiristas who were forced to join the army in the streets or in prisons. These battalions were specialized in invading and conquering enemy trenches and ships using mostly white weapons, such as bayonets, machetes, and swords. The capoeiristas were so fierce and effective in battle that they earned the reputation of being the Brazilian Warriors.

The war elevated marginalized individuals to heroes, and gang leaders became associated with powerful individuals. In December 1869, the military police caught a group of capoeiras near the king's palace. An inquiry revealed that four of them were military policemen.

After the war, in Rio alone 2900 slaves were freed because of their participation in the war, among them many capoeiras.

=== Capoeira and political violence ===
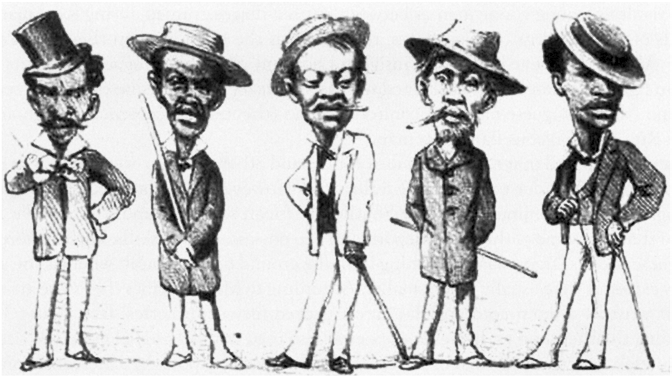
A caricature ridiculing the recruitment of capoeiras into the police promoted by the Conservative Party (1885). Note the use of sticks.

After the war, many capoeristas became associated with ruling politicians, buying votes and intimidating voters for the Conservative Party. By resorting to violence against the opposition voters, these gangs secured impunity in their territorial domains.

By the 1870s the capoeira gangs formed two main maltas: Nagoas and Guaiamos, organized by city parishes. Guaiamú has parties such as Saint Francis, Saint Rita, Ouro Preto, Marinha, and Saint Domingos de Gusmão. Their color was red. Nagoa has parties like Saint Lucia, Saint Joseph, Lapa, Saint Anne, and Moura. They color was white. Many workers wearing these colors were often targeted with violence. These parties had leaders, assistants, policemen and rank-and-file soldiers, which discovers military principles in gang culture. Moreover, many capoeiras served as policemen, National Guards or soldiers. Soares suggests that while the Guaiamus were mixed-race, the Nagoas were mostly blacks of African origin. Assunção finds this assumption problematic as Africans and Creoles were present in all the city parishes.

Both gangs held regular Sunday exercises, with knife and razor blows:

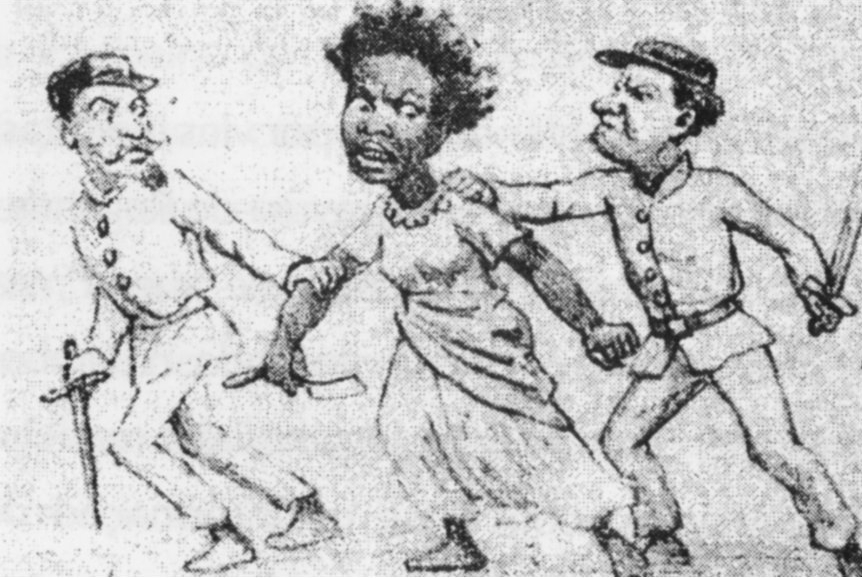
Female capoeira with razor 1882.

The most famous capoeiras served as instructors for the newcomers. At first, the blows were rehearsed, making use of the clean hand; when the disciple took advantage of the lessons, they began to be rehearsed with wooden weapons and finally they made use of their very blades, and the place of the exercises often became bloody.

In 1871 the police commissioner clarified the growing capoeira problem: it isn't unlawful; only physical injury, assault, or murder by capoeiras are crimes. This complicates legal action, as they are national Guard members, not drifters, and also army and navy veterans.

Street battles among maltas were exceptionally brutal, marked by the use of all available weapons like clubs and knives, frequently resulting in a high number of casualties. In 1872, the police commissioner revealed that capoeira groups, organized by neighborhoods with specific leaders, not only compete for control among themselves but also "kill and maim other innocent citizens".

The Nagoas and Guaiamuns were used, respectively, as a hitforce by the Conservative and Liberal party. Newly founded Republican party was among the rare political entities opposing the maltas. In 1872, capoeiras were involved in the August elections. The major political incident occurred in February 1873, when capoeira gangs violently broke republican meeting, inspired by the declaration of a republic in Spain. A República from March 1873 wrote:

This is a reign of terror: we are under the thumb of gangsters. The fears we expressed when we saw the voters caving in to these abusive attacks have been fully and sadly confirmed.

During carnival time, capoeira fighters would lead the bands through the streets of that city. The infamous capoeiras were typically only seen during military parades, where they position themselves at the forefront of the troops. In 1878, Moraes Filho wrote that the capoeiras form up in groups of 20 to 100 in front of troops and carnival processions, "provoking disorder, running, wounding". On January 27, 1878, the police arrested a large gang of capoeiras "who were walking in front of the band of the 10th infantry battalion". The same night, one hundred capoeiras were arrested.

On January 29, 1878, two women, Isabel and Ana, were arrested for "showing their expertise in capoeiragem".

In 1881 the majority of the arrested capoeiras (60%) were free citizens (usually workers), against 40% slaves. In 1885, whites represented at least 22% of the arrested, increasing to 33% in 1890, blacks counted for 36% and 30% respectively, while others not being qualified in terms of colour.

=== The formation of the Black Guard ===
On May 13, 1888, slavery ended in Brazil with the Golden Law, signed by Princess Isabel. Immediately, the Brazilian Imperial regime formed the Black Guard (Guarda Negra), secret paramilitary organization composed of freed African slaves and capueristas. Its members swore an oath of allegiance to Princess Isabel. The purpose was to ensure Isabel's accession to the throne, in opposition to the rising Republican movement.

The Guarda Negra capoeiristas did horrible crimes, violently disrupting both private and public gatherings of republicans. The greatest assault occurred on December 30, 1888, during the republicans’ gathering at the French Gymnastic Society. When Silva Jardim began his speech, the room became a battleground, with many dead and wounded. On July 15, 1889, the newspaper Novidades described one of these assaults:

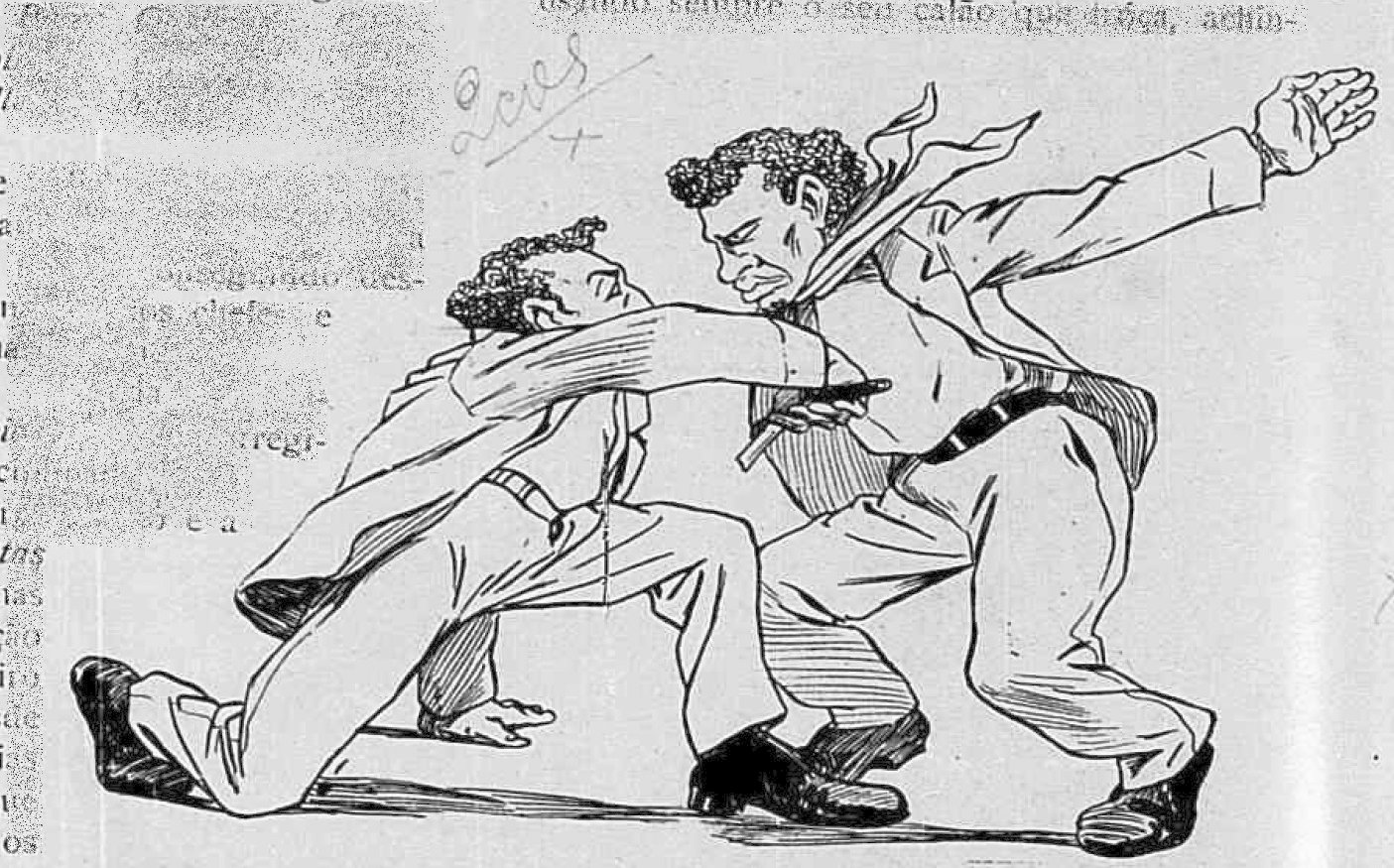
Capoeira carioca using lamparina, a straight razor attack to the victim's neck artery, by Calixto, 1906.

The capoeiras went as far as pelting the republicans with stones in front of the Brazilian Congress... The plan was to attack the republicans from the front and the rear simultaneously... Clubs were raised, razors swung, and stones flew in the air... Many were injured. Panic spread in the city. The cavalry arrived.

On November 15, 1889, First Brazilian Republic was proclaimed. Following the coup, the Republicans implemented strict measures against the organized crime. The police commissioner Sampaio Ferraz prepared a list of prominent capoeiras and began mass arrests. In merely a week, from December 12 to 18, 1889, 111 capoeiras were arrested. In 1890, new Republic decreed the prohibition of capoeira in the whole country.

To engage in exercises of agility and physical dexterity known as capoeiragem in public streets and squares; to engage in running with weapons or instruments capable of causing bodily harm, inciting riots or disorders, threatening specific or unspecified individuals, or instilling fear of harm: Penalty – imprisonment for two to six months. For leaders or heads, the penalty shall be doubled.

— Penal Code of the United States of Brazil (1890), On Vagrants and Capoeira

During the prohibition, any individual caught practicing capoeira would be arrested. Street rodas seemingly vanished, although remnants might have endured in certain shantytowns or working-class neighborhoods. On January 10, 1890, when the suppression of capoeira was at its height, Pedro Murat Pilar, brother of Luís Murat, general secretary to Rio de Janeiro's governor, was arrested on charges of capoeira.

This policy undoubtedly succeeded, and the powerful capoeira gangs were dismantled. But the phenomenon did not vanish altogether. During the persecution of the capueristas in Rio de Janeiro, many of them fled to São Paulo.

=== Illegal period ===
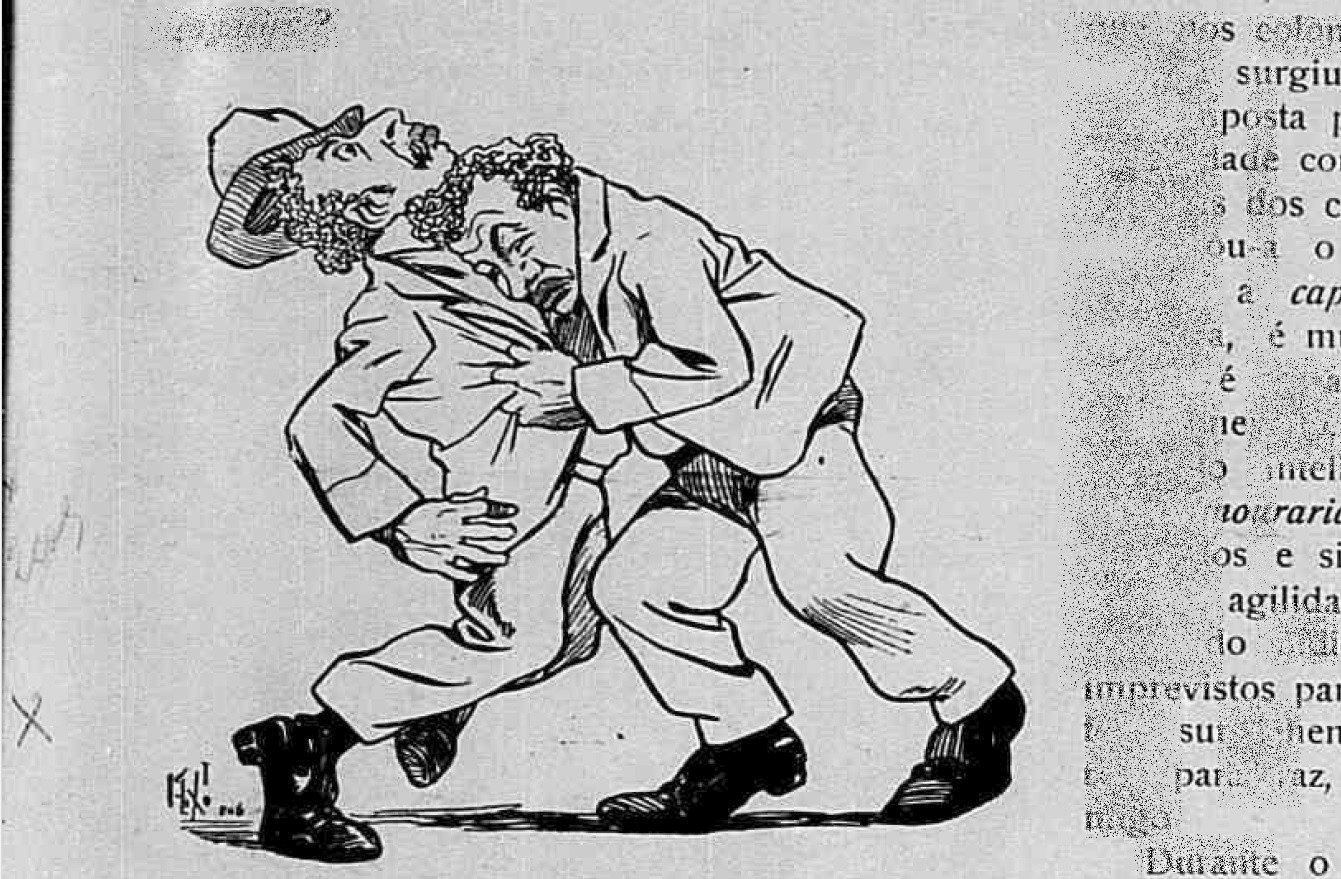
Caricature of capoeira carioca using cocada (coconut candy), headbutt on the chin while grabbing the opponent, by Calixto, 1906.

In the early 1900s capoeira started to gain recognition as a national martial art and sport among the elite. While capoeira was still officially outlawed, the first capoeira manuals were published in small, secluded military circles in Rio de Janeiro. These manuals were intended for the exclusive use of the "brothers-in-arms". In 1907, the handbook Guia do capoeira ou Ginástica Brasileira (Guide to capoeira or Brazilian Gymnastics), published in Rio de Janeiro. The handbook featured chapters with comprehensive explanations covering proper stances, fundamental postures, and strategies for both defense and attack. The introduction states:

This work was written by a high-ranking officer in the Brazilian army, an expert in weaponry, a military instructor, and an authority on defensive gymnastics, the genuine art of capoeira. [...] Our efforts are directed at elevating Brazilian gymnastics to a national level, like English football, French savate, German wrestling, and other national sports.

In 1909 there was a famous official match when a capoeirista named Francisco da Silva Ciríaco, known as "Macaco," defeated a Japanese jujitsu instructor named Sada Miyako with the rabo de arraia kick. He was carried out of the stadium on the shoulders after the match and hailed as a national hero in Rio.

First capoeira schools were founded in Rio and Niterói as early as the 1910s, though they did not last long. In 1927, Mário Santos, in the introduction to his booklet, made the following appeal:

It's high time that we freed ourselves from foreign sports and paid attention to what is ours... Brazilian gymnastics are equal in value to all the others... better than boxing that only uses the arms; better than Greco-Roman wrestling based only on strength. It is superior to Japanese close combat that combines all these arts because it includes the intelligence and vitality characteristic of our hot blood by combining the exercise of arms, legs, head, and body!

In the same year Brazilian writer and politician Coelho Neto published a book stressing the importance of teaching capoeira, considering it superior to other martial arts. He advocated that "capoeira should be taught in all schools and in all army and navy bases", emphasizing the need of removing it from the streets to educational system. In the 1920s and 1930s, official capoeira schools and institutes were opened.

In 1928 Anibal Burlamaqui published the first official capoeira manual, Gymnástica Nacional (capoeiragem), methodisada e regrada, where he introduced boxing-like rules for capoeira competition. The manual aimed to transform capoeira from a stigmatized street practice into a legitimate sport.

In the early 1930s Sinhozinho, a military officer and the fighting instructor of the feared Policia Especial under dictator Vargas, established his capoeira academies in Rio. The first was in the bustling city center, and the second was established in the affluent Ipanema Beach district in 1936, "for good young men who aspire to courage".

During the 1930s capoeira practitioners could be arrested for displaying physical skills. However, the number of arrests, and especially of convictions, were diminishing gradually. Of all accused of capoeira, 76% were freed after trial.

During the 1930s and 1940s capoeira underwent a transformative phase in its history, as authorities and intellectuals worked to portray it as a product of Brazil's unique conditions, shaping it into a national sport.

== Music ==
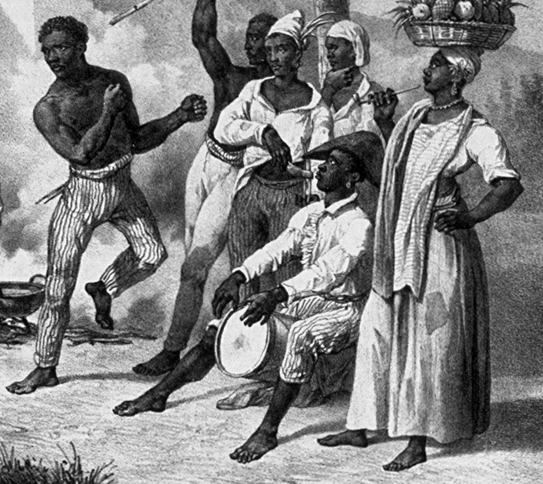
Playing capoeira to the sound of ngoma drum, c. 1823.

Until the mid-nineteenth century, drums were a prominent musical instrument in capoeira. In the early to mid-nineteenth century Rio, capoeira was initially described by travelers as a war dance with drumbeats or hand clapping. Later, the music and the musical instruments disappeared.

In 1818 João Angola was arrested for possessing a small drum at a capoeira gathering. Playing a drum could lead to severe punishment, like on December 5, 1820, when Mathias Benguela, a slave, received 200 lashes for it. Despite punishment, drumming continued. An illustration from 1824 by Rugendas shows a participant in roda playing a drum.

In 1833 the playing of African drums in Rio de Janeiro was prohibited by law. Due to the drum's size, it couldn't be concealed, leading to clandestine drumming in remote locations at night. To evade arrest, slaves used makeshift percussion instruments like clay or metal pieces, shells, and stones. The drumming that accompanied capoeira in the city of Rio de Janeiro had disappeared by midcentury.

In 1859 French journalist Charles Ribeyrolls described the capoeira game on plantations in Rio de Janeiro province, "accompanied by the powerful, militant rhythm of the Congo drum".

In the mid-1860s Marcílio Dias was arrested in Rio because he played capoeira in front of a band of musicians.

== Clothes ==
In the early nineteenth century, African slaves had limited clothing options, which denoted their social status, and they were prohibited from wearing shoes. In the first two decades of the 19th century, capoeiras mainly used yellow and red ribbons and hats. In Kongo religion, the ribbon fluttering in the wind was a media between the two worlds – the physical and the spiritual. It was also used in social events and funerals, and on altars. In Congo, Africans used to place white ribbons on altars to communicate with supernatural powers.

Antonio Pigafetta reported that at the court of the king of Kongo, "they wore very small yellow and red caps.

Early nineteenth-century capoeiras typically wore tight pants and seldom a shirt. By the midcentury, a jacket or coat gained popularity. The hat remained an important clothing item, signifying status, according to Mary Karasch.

== Techniques ==
Mello Moraes Filho was amazed with capoeira skills, attributing to them almost superhuman abilities:

A capoeirista performing in front of his rival leaps, vaults, attacks, evades, hops, feints. He uses his legs, head, hands, knife, and razor almost simultaneously. It is quite usual for one of them to defeat ten or twenty adversaries.

The journalist Luís Edmundo also described the capoeirista's astonishing agility:

He runs, retreats, advances, turns around—fast, wary, and decisive. He is fast, volatile like liquid, and as elusive as a thought, as lightning. He advances and retreats, reappears and disappears in a split second. All his power lies in his amazing coordination.

The late 19th century street-fighting capoeiragem was a mixed martial art, combining five main fighting techniques: headbutts, foot kicks, open hand blows, blades, and stick techniques. There were some punching and wrestling techniques also.

=== Kicks ===
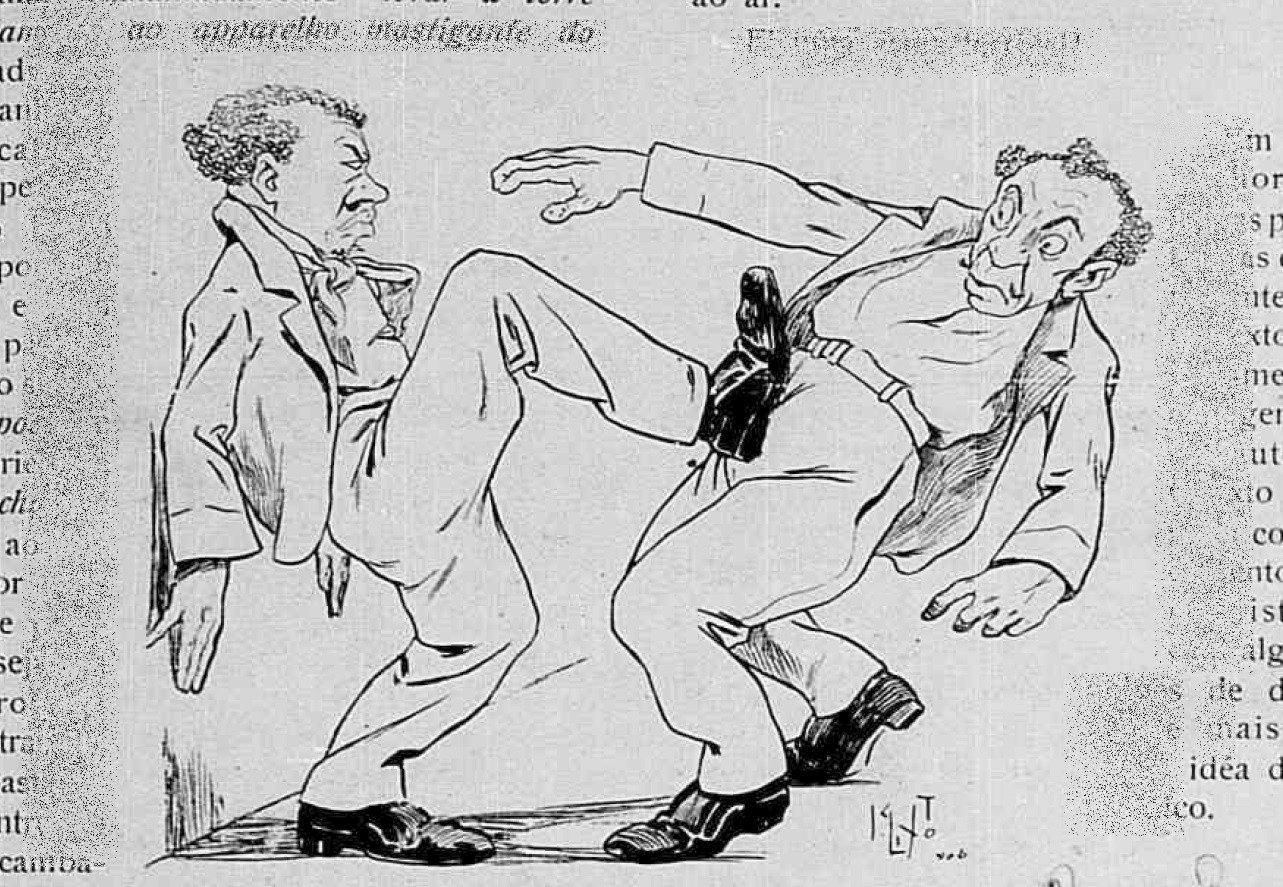
Caricature of capoeira carioca, using meter o andante kick.

The capoeira carioca's kicking repertoire was primarily linked to inverted kicks, such as the rabo de arraia and the pentana. The rabo de arraia was executed by flipping the body and pivoting one leg to strike the opponent, whereas the pentana consisted of flipping the body and using both feet to push against the adversary's chest.

=== Headbutts ===
Headbutts were the capoeiras' primary technique, as per police records. An English visitor to Rio wrote in 1826 on this lethal technique:

They need no stiletto, ferro de gaiola, or any other weapon. In lieu of all these, they use only the head; and with it, they butt like bulls at the chest of their victim. I saw a field officer who had been murdered in this manner and thrown over the wall into his garden, where his family found him in the morning: the upper part of the body had been flattened as if the implement of death had been a mallet.

The significance of the head butt becomes evident in the different names for different headbutts. For instance, the caveira no espelho, meaning "skull in a mirror," referred to a standing head strike aimed at the face, whereas the cocada denoted an upward strike directed under the chin.

=== Blade techniques ===
Primary among the capoeira blade techniques were the lamparina (oil lamp), a special straight razor attack to the victim's neck artery.

=== Anti-blade techniques ===
Capoeiristas employed Angolan-style agility to defend against bladed weapons, allowing unarmed masters to face armed opponents confidently. The Rio's capoeira antiblade techniques included espada, a circular kick to disarm an opponent holding a knife, and suicidio, which aims to kick an opponent's legs out, causing him to kill himself with his own blade:

This blow is unique and terrible because if the enemy is armed with a punhal or knife, he unfailingly kills himself.

— Anibal Burlamaqui, Gymnastica nacional (capoeiragem), 1928

=== Stick techniques ===
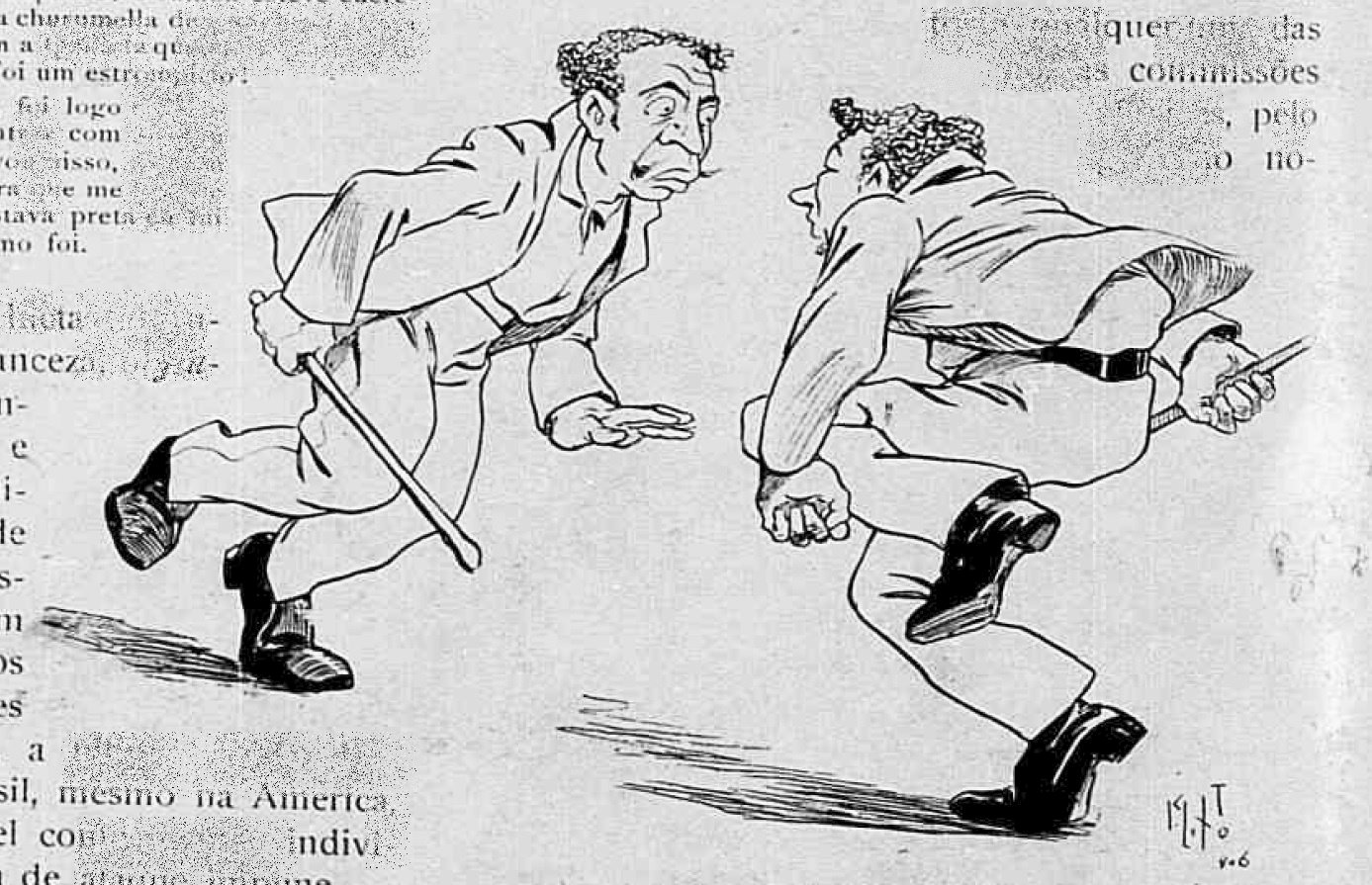
Caricature of capoeira carioca, using peneiracao strike.

New combat realities emerged when the Portuguese, particularly sailors, brought martial tradition jogo do pau to Brazil. It involved using a long staff, gripping the narrow end for striking, which could deliver deadly blows.

To confront it, capoeiras employed two tactics. When unarmed, capoeiras relied on their defensive agility to wear down the staff-wielder, enticing them to make a mistake and create an opening to exploit. Capoeiras also started sharpen their short sticks, to counter the threat.

== Interpretations ==
Unlike many authors who see capoeira in 19th century Rio as a mere criminal activity, Desch-Obi believes it was a matter of honor for African slaves and their descendants. For example, the capoeira became potent political message when performed in the front of Catholic processions or government-backed marching bands. Capoeira skills also served to protect members of black community "from random acts of violence or kidnapping". If a slave under the protection of a malta was sold away from the city, the maltas would come together to seek revenge. Also, if it was determined that a particular individual, whether enslaved African, free person of color, or white, had violated their codes, the malta would then choose the avenger. Acts of vengeance were often executed during public festivities, including major Catholic processions or entrudo, which preceded the Brazilian Carnival.

Even during slavery black capoeiras challenged white supremacy, strutting through the streets with confidence. Joaquim Benguela even dared to enter the police headquarters wearing his capoeira hat, showing his disdain for the authorities. On July 4, 1812, Manuel Pardo enter the police headquarters, verbally insulted and physically assaulted a police officer with a whip, a potent symbol of white authority over enslaved individuals. These actions were defiant gestures against white dominance in society. According to Desch-Obi, black capoeiras also expressed their pride by openly wielding weapons. They defied the law that restricted knife possession to white Brazilians, using blades as a symbol of resistance and equality.

Desch-Obi concludes that capoeira societies in Rio stood as enduring symbols of slave empowerment. Unlike most slaves in the Americas who lived in constant fear of violence, capoeiras instilled fear in white society, including the police, due to their potential for violence.

== Literature ==
- Johnson, Paul Christopher (2002). Secrets, Gossip, and Gods: The Transformation of Brazilian Candomblé. Oxford and New York: Oxford University Press. ISBN 9780195150582.
- Capoeira, Nestor (2002). Capoeira: Roots of the Dance-Fight-Game. Blue Snake Books. ISBN 978-1-58394-637-4.
- Assunção, Matthias Röhrig (2002). Capoeira: The History of an Afro-Brazilian Martial Art. Routledge. ISBN 978-0-7146-8086-6.
- Capoeira, Nestor (2007). The Little Capoeira Book. Blue Snake Books. ISBN 9781583941980.
- Talmon-Chvaicer, Maya (2008). The Hidden History of Capoeira: A Collision of Cultures in the Brazilian Battle Dance. University of Texas Press. ISBN 978-0-292-71723-7.
- Desch-Obi, Thomas J. (2008). Fighting for Honor: The History of African Martial Art Traditions in the Atlantic World. University of South Carolina Press. ISBN 978-1-57003-718-4.
- Miranda, Clícea Maria Augusto (2011). Memórias e Histórias da Guarda Negra: verso e reverso de uma combativa organização de libertos. São Paulo, Brazil.

== See also ==
- History of capoeira
- Manduca da Praia
