= Trygve Bjørgo =

Norwegian educator and lyricist

Trygve Bjørgo (5 January 1916 – 2 March 1997) was a Norwegian educator and lyricist.

== Biography ==
He was born in Nord-Aurdal Municipality in Oppland county, Norway. He attended Valdres People's College and Grimeland School in Oslo. He took a linguistic diploma with Norwegian language major at the University of Oslo in 1947. He taught at Grimeland School from 1948-1949. From 1949 he was a lecturer at Gudbrandsdal Upper Secondary School in Vinstra where he lived until 1964. From the fall that year he was appointed as principal of Valdres Upper Secondary School at Fagernes.

He published several works of poetry, including I minneskogen (1952), Mørker og morgon (1954), Vokstergrunn (1961), Frø i vind (1968), Kvit hest under hegg (1972), Auke åkeren (1979) and Straumar under yta (1986). He won the Sunnmørsprisen in 1961 for Vokstergrunn. He was the chairman of Noregs Mållag from 1963 to 1965. He died during 1997 and was buried in the cemetery at Aurdal Church.

Cultural offices
Preceded by Ivar Eskeland	Chairman of Noregs Mållag; 1963–1965	Succeeded by Hans Olav Tungesvik
