= Anibal Burlamaqui =

Anibal Burlamaqui

Anníbal Burlamaqui (1898–1965), known as Mestre Zuma, was a Brazilian customs officer, poet, boxer and a prominent advocate for the sport of capoeira during its prohibition. He was one of the main proponents of the fighting-oriented capoeira carioca, without dance, music, and rituals.

Burlamaqui's efforts were part of a broader movement by educated Brazilians to destigmatize capoeira and promote it as a national sport.

== Life ==
Since the age of ten, Anibal had been practising Swedish gymnastics, weight lifting and training on horizontal bars. He states that he learned Greco-Roman wrestling at eighteen, and later trained boxing. He was a true athlete and a very different character from the traditional cariocan capoeira of that time.

=== Gymnástica nacional (capoeiragem) ===
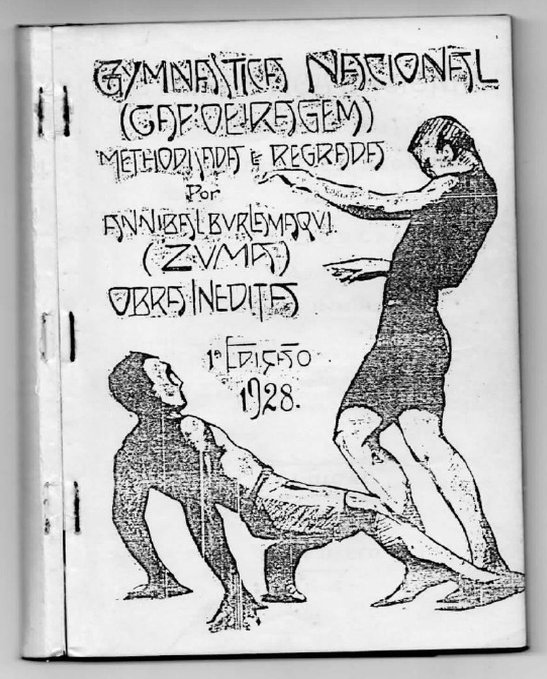
Gymnástica nacional (capoeiragem), 1928.

In 1928, Burlamaqui published the first capoeira manual, Gymnástica nacional (capoeiragem), methodisada e regrada, where he introduced boxing-like rules for capoeira competition. The manual aimed to transform capoeira from a stigmatized street practice into a recognized and legitimate sport. As the title suggests, Burlamaqui devised rules of how capoeira matches should be fought in the ring: short confrontations of three minutes interrupted by two minutes of rest. Athletes were to dress in shorts and shirts like boxers, and wear boxing ankle boots.

Burlamaqui suggested a series of exercises, insisting on the importance of jumps, how to fall and get up quickly, and how to confuse the opponent through constant movement (peneirar). Hes overall style seem more inspired by Europe than Africa. For example, he advocated "a noble and upright attitude" for the basic posture (which he called "the guard"), quite different from the crouched ginga in capoeira.

Burlamaqui's manual provided an extensive explanation of kicks and counter-attacks. He described the following moves in his manual: rasteira, rabo de arraia, corta-capim, cabeçada, fagão, banda de frente, rapa, bahu, tesoura, baiana, dourado, queixada, passo de cegonha, encruzilhada, escorrão, pentear or peneirar, tombo de ladeira or calco, arrastão, tranco, chincha, xulipa, banda amarrada, banda jogada, banda forçada, me esquece, vôo do morcego, espada and suicídio.

The vast majority of these techniques were part of the cariocan capoeira arsenal. However, he introduced two movements that he claimed to have borrowed from the martial dance known as batuque:

- "bau", used in both batuque and sambas in Northern Brazil.
- "rapa", a form of sweeping step (rasteira) applied to the outside of the heel, in contrast to the usual inside technique.

Additionally, he introduced three kicks, which he asserted to be his own inventions: "queixada," "passo de cegonha" (stork step), and "espada" (sword).

His manual was greatly influential, being even taught at academies.

== Literature ==
- Burlamaqui, Anibal (1928). Gymnástica nacional (capoeiragem), methodisada e regrada. Rio de Janeiro.
- Assunção, Matthias Röhrig (2002). Capoeira: The History of an Afro-Brazilian Martial Art. Routledge. ISBN 978-0-7146-8086-6.

== See also ==
- Mestre Sinhozinho
- Capoeira carioca
