= Hans Olav Tungesvik =

Norwegian politician

Hans Olav Tungesvik (22 May 1936 – 16 June 2017) was a Norwegian physician and Member of Parliament for the Christian Democratic Party.

== Biography ==
Tungesvik was born in Skånevik Municipality in Hordaland, Norway. He graduated from the University of Oslo with a cand.med. degree in 1964 and became a specialist in psychiatry in 1975. He had his own practice from 1985 to 2008. From 1995 to 1997 he was associated with Modum Bads Nervesanatorium, an institution for the treatment of mental disorders in Modum Municipality.

Tungesvik was a member of the municipal council for Kvinnherad Municipality from 1967 to 1969 and on the municipal council for Etne Municipality from 1971 to 1975. He was elected to the Norwegian Parliament from Hordaland in 1977, and was re-elected on one occasion. He was the chairman of Noregs Mållag from 1965 to 1970.

== Personal life ==
He was awarded the King's Medal of Merit (Kongens fortjenstmedalje) in gold during 2007. He was the father of jurist Steinulf Tungesvik and he was the grandfather to Hans Christian Tungesvik. Hans Olav Tungesvik died in 2017 at the age of 81.

Cultural offices
Preceded by Trygve Bjørgo	Chairman of Noregs Mållag; 1965–1970	Succeeded by Bjarne Slapgard
