= Leiv Heggstad =

Norwegian educator, linguist and translator (1879–1954)

- Born: 24 March 1879; Namsos, Norway
- Died: 8 March 1954 (aged 74)
- Occupations: Educator, linguist and translator
- Parent: Marius Hægstad
- Relatives: Olav Heggstad (brother)

Leiv Heggstad (24 March 1879 – 8 March 1954) was a Norwegian educator, linguist and translator. He was born in Namsos as the son of linguist and professor Marius Hægstad and Pernele Larsdotter Midgaard, and was a brother of engineering professor Olav Heggstad. Among his works are Utsyn yver gamall norsk folkevisedikting from 1912, Gamalnorsk ordbok from 1930, and Norsk grammatikk from 1931. He also translated books from Latin into Nynorsk language.
