= Knut Liestøl =

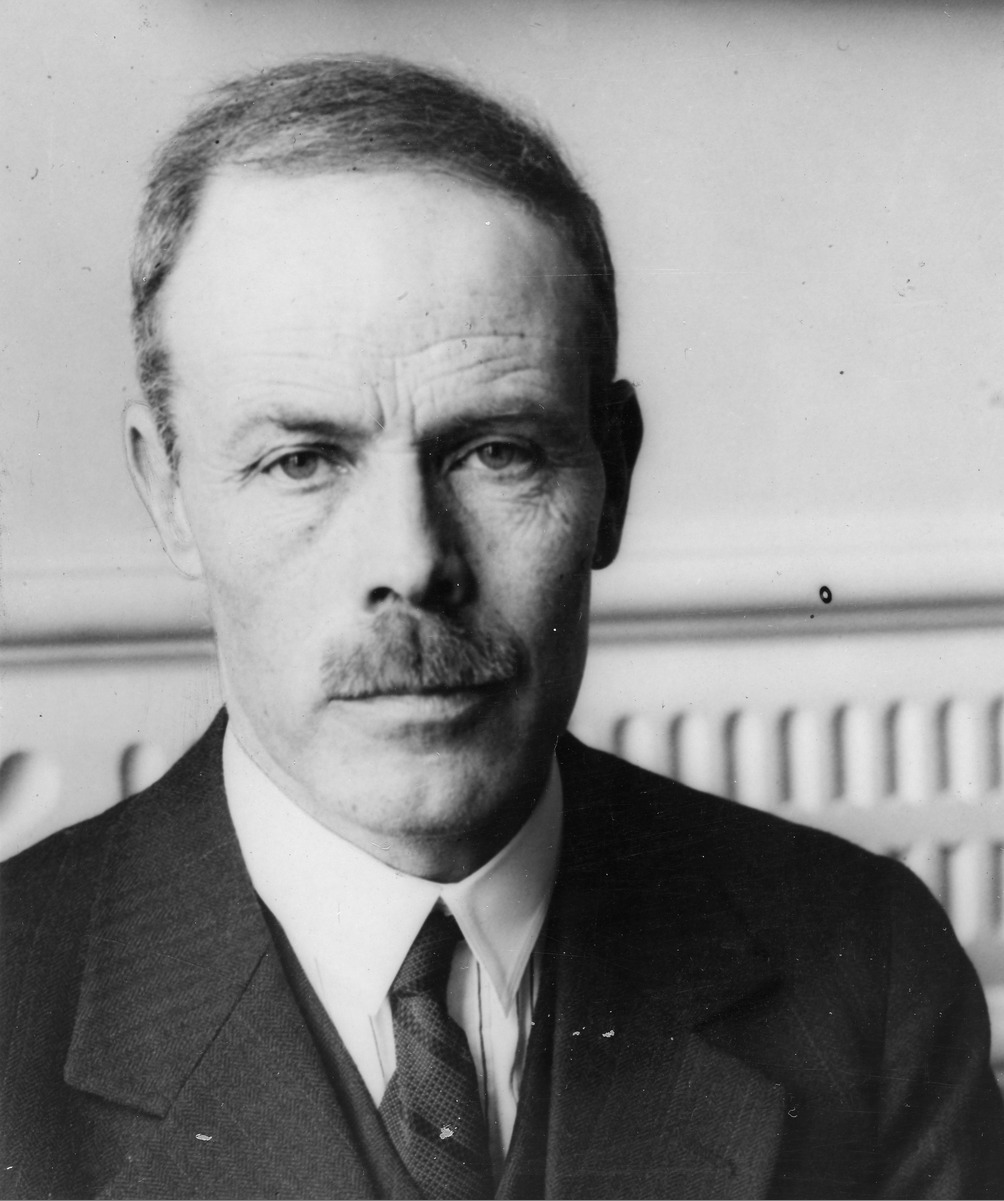
- Liestøl in ca. 1935.

Minister of Education and Church Affairs
- In office 3 March 1933 – 20 March 1935
- Prime Minister: J. L. Mowinckel
- Preceded by: Nils Trædal
- Succeeded by: Nils Hjelmtveit

Chair of Noregs Mållag
- In office 1925–1926
- Preceded by: Halvdan Koht
- Succeeded by: Torleiv Hannaas

Personal details
- Born: 13 November 1881 Aaseral Municipality, Lister og Mandal, Sweden-Norway
- Died: 26 June 1952 (aged 70) Bærum Municipality, Akershus, Norway
- Party: Liberal
- Spouse: Signe Høgetveit (m. 1913)
- Children: Olav Liestøl

Knut Liestøl (13 November 1881 – 26 June 1952) was a Norwegian folklorist, Nynorsk proponent, and politician.

He was born in Aaseral Municipality to farmers Olav Knutson Liestøl (1855–1944) and Sigrid Røynelid (1856–1950). He was a nephew of Lars Liestøl. In July 1913 he married farmers' daughter Signe Høgetveit. Their son Olav became a noted glaciologist.

A folklorist by profession, he took the dr.philos. degree in 1915 with the thesis Norske trollvisor og norrøne sogor (Norwegian troll songs and Norse sagas). He was appointed as a docent in Nynorsk at the Royal Frederick University in 1909 and promoted to professor of folkloristics in 1917. He also served in Mowinckel's Third Cabinet as Minister of Education and Church Affairs from 1933 to 1935. He was also the chairman of Noregs Mållag from 1925 to 1926.

Liestøl was a fellow of the Norwegian Academy of Science and Letters from 1916 and graduated as a Knight, Grand Cross of the Order of the Falcon and the Order of the Three Stars. He resided at Ramstad. He died in June 1952 in Bærum.

Cultural offices
Preceded by Halvdan Koht	Chairman of Noregs Mållag; 1925–1926	Succeeded by Torleiv Hannaas
