= Olav Liestøl =

Norwegian glaciologist (1916–2002)

Olav Liestøl (24 February 1916 – 3 April 2002) was a Norwegian glaciologist.

He was born in Kristiania (now Oslo) to the folklorist and politician Knut Liestøl, but grew up in Blommenholm. He was a member of Milorg during the occupation of Norway by Nazi Germany, and took the cand.real. degree at the University of Oslo in 1945.

From 1948 to his retirement in 1986 he worked as a glaciologist at the Norwegian Polar Institute, and was described as "Norway's most recognized glaciologist". He mainly studied the geology of Svalbard, but also Antarctica and elsewhere. From 1985 he was also an adjunct professor at the University of Oslo.

He resided at Blommenholm. He died in April 2002.

== Legacy ==
The glacier of Liestølbreen in Torell Land at Spitsbergen, Svalbard is named after him.
