= Hans Eidnes =

Norwegian politician

Hans Eidnes (20 March 1887 in Bjarkøy, Troms – 5 June 1962) was a Norwegian politician for the Liberal Party.

He was elected to the Norwegian Parliament from Troms in 1945, but was not re-elected.

He was born in Bjarkøy Municipality, an island municipality in Troms county, Norway. Eidnes was a member of the municipal council of the neighboring Trondenes Municipality during the term 1928–1931 and was deputy mayor in 1931–1934.

Outside politics, he worked as a school teacher. He was the chairman of Noregs Mållag from 1946 to 1949, and member of Norsk Språknemnd from 1952 to 1959.

Cultural offices
Preceded by Asbjørn Øverås; Knut Markhus	Chairman of Noregs Mållag; 1946–1949	Succeeded by Asbjorn Overas
