= Kirsten Lauritzen =

Kirsten Lauritzen née Hartvig-Møller (1902–1980) was a Danish philanthropist who is remembered in particular for her efforts to help needy children. They included Finns in the late 1930s, German children after the war (which caused some controversy), Hungarian refugees in 1956 and finally Vietnamese children in 1975. She provided facilities for the elderly, including folk high school courses on the island of Mallorca. Throughout her life, Lauritzen was a strong supporter of the scout movement.

== Biography ==
Born on 15 June 1902 in the Copenhagen district of Frederiksberg, Kirsten Hartvig-Møller was the daughter of the high-school headmaster Hans Hartvig-Møller (1873–1953) and his wife Karen Sophie née Steenstrup (1872–1956). In 1927, she married the shipowner Knud Lauritzen with whom she had six children: Grete (1930), Ole (1933), Lise (1936), Marianne (1939), Karen (1942) and Jan (1943). The marriage was dissolved in 1963.

Raised in a well-to-do home by parents who were socially active, especially in their commitment to education and the well-being of children, she was the first girl to attend Gammel Hellerup Gymnasium where her father was the principal. She was also the first girl scout in Denmark, also thanks to her father who had founded the Danish scout movement in 1910.

Her contribution to children's care began with the Finnish-Russian Winter War in 1939 when she organized clothes collections for those in need and had four Finnish children living in her home for the next two years. Under the German occupation of Denmark (1939–1945), Lauritzen was active in the Danish Women's Society Service (Danske Kvinders Samfundstjeneste or DKS) under the Women's Council in Denmark, chairing the Copenhagen branch of DKS and organizing the production of large quantities of jam from wild fruit for those in financial difficulties.

After the liberation in 1945, she headed a fund-raising campaign to help German children orphaned by the war, criticizing the Danish Women's Society for refusing support. This led to her being treated by some as a traitor and a Nazi but she fought back, citing anti-Nazi articles she had published earlier. At the large Storedam residence in Tokkekøb Hegn which she inherited from her father in 1953, she provided accommodation for refugees from Hungary in 1956 and for those from the Vietnam war in 1975.

From 1943, Lauritzen assisted the elderly, initially by providing accommodation and cultural courses for them in a home belonging to her parents-in-law. She later adapted the Storedam residence as a home and holiday centre for the elderly. In 1963, she arranged for old people to travel to a hotel on the island of Mallorca where she engaged pensioners to given courses lasting from six to eight weeks. Storedam was also used as a folk high school. Lauritzen made it available free of charge for use by the scouts.

In 1972, Lauritzen was honoured with the Royal Medal of Recompense (gold).

Kirsten Lauritzen died in Storedam, Hørsholm Municipality, on 7 February 1980. Before her death, she had established the Hartvig-Møller Foundation for the continuation of her work. Seniorhøjskolen Storedam continues to operate today as a folk high school, offering week-long courses for pensioners.
