= Hartvig (surname) =

Hartvig is a surname. Notable people with the surname include:

- Daniel Hartvig (born 1996), Danish track cyclist
- Hans Hartvig-Møller (1873–1953), Danish educator and scouting pioneer

== See also ==
- Hartvig (given name)
