= Asbjørn Øverås =

Norwegian educator (1896–1966)

Asbjørn Øverås (4 April 1896, in Nesset Municipality, Møre og Romsdal – 13 October 1966) was a Norwegian educator.

Born in Nesset Municipality, he worked as a headmaster in Orkdal Municipality from 1923. Having taken the dr.philos. degree in 1937, he worked as principal of Trondheim Cathedral School from 1938 to 1966. Influenced by Grundtvig as an educator, he edited the journal Norsk pedagogisk tidsskrift from 1941 to 1945. He was the chairman of Noregs Mållag from 1949 to 1952.

Cultural offices
Preceded by Hans Eidnes	Chairman of Noregs Mållag; 1949–1952	Succeeded by Knut Robberstad
