= Manduca da Praia =

19th century Brazilian gang leader

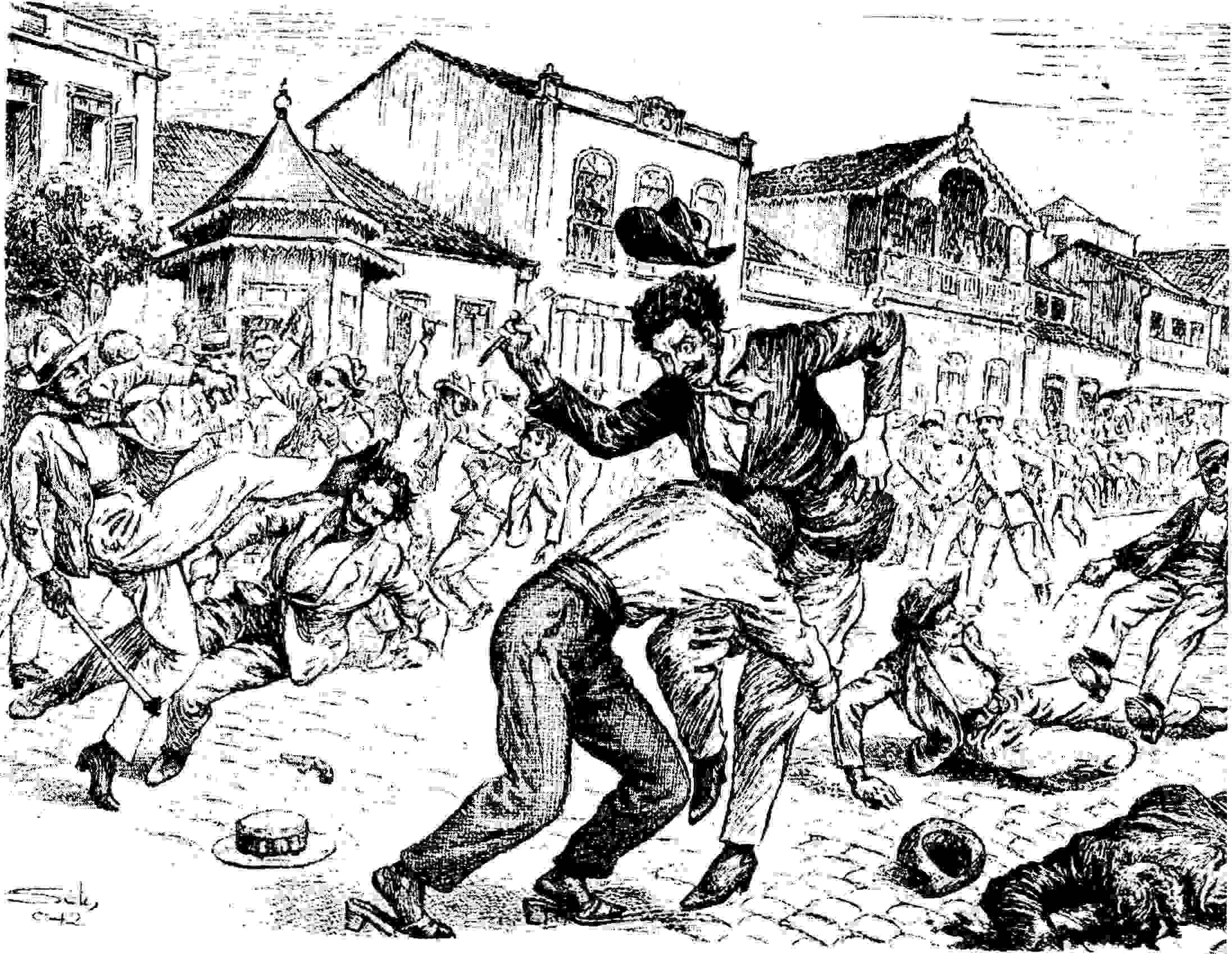
An engraving featuring Manduca da Praia and a group of capoeira fighters.

Manduca da Praia was an expert capoeira fighter and gang leader from 19th century Rio de Janeiro.

Manduca da Praia consistently dressed in remarkably elegant manner. It is said that he possessed a thriving fish market business and enjoyed a comfortable lifestyle. Moreover, he held influence over electoral affairs in his residing area. Remarkably, despite facing a staggering 27 criminal charges (including assault and knife-related incidents), he consistently obtained acquittals, largely attributed to the political connections he maintained.

When the renowned Portuguese jogo do pau expert Santana arrived in Rio, he sought out the most celebrated capoeira practitioner, Manduca da Praia. They engaged in a fight, during which Manduca skillfully launched Santana into the air with a precisely aimed kick. Following the encounter, they shared a drink and forged a lasting comradeship.

== See also ==
- Capoeira carioca

== Literature ==
- Capoeira, Nestor (2007). The Little Capoeira Book. Blue Snake Books. ISBN 9781583941980.
- Desch-Obi, Thomas J. (2008). Fighting for Honor: The History of African Martial Art Traditions in the Atlantic World. University of South Carolina Press. ISBN 978-1-57003-718-4.
