= Knut Robberstad =

Norwegian jurist and philologist

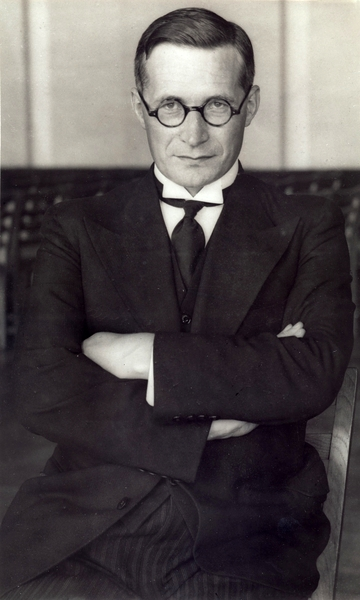
Knut Robberstad, c. 1933

Knut Ingebrikt Robberstad (22 April 1899 – 31 July 1981) was a Norwegian jurist and philologist.

He was born in Askøy Municipality, Hordaland, Norway. He was a professor of jurisprudence at the University of Oslo from 1945 to 1969. His juridical publications include Oreigningsvederlaget (1968) and Rettsutferd (1969). A philologist who chaired Noregs Mållag from 1952 to 1957, he translated several documents from Old Norse, including Magnus Lagabøters bylov (1923), a law dating from the reign of Magnus IV of Norway, and Gulatingslovi (1937).

Cultural offices
Preceded by Asbjørn Øverås	Chairman of Noregs Mållag; 1952–1957	Succeeded by Hartvig Kiran
