= Marius Hægstad =

Norwegian educator and politician

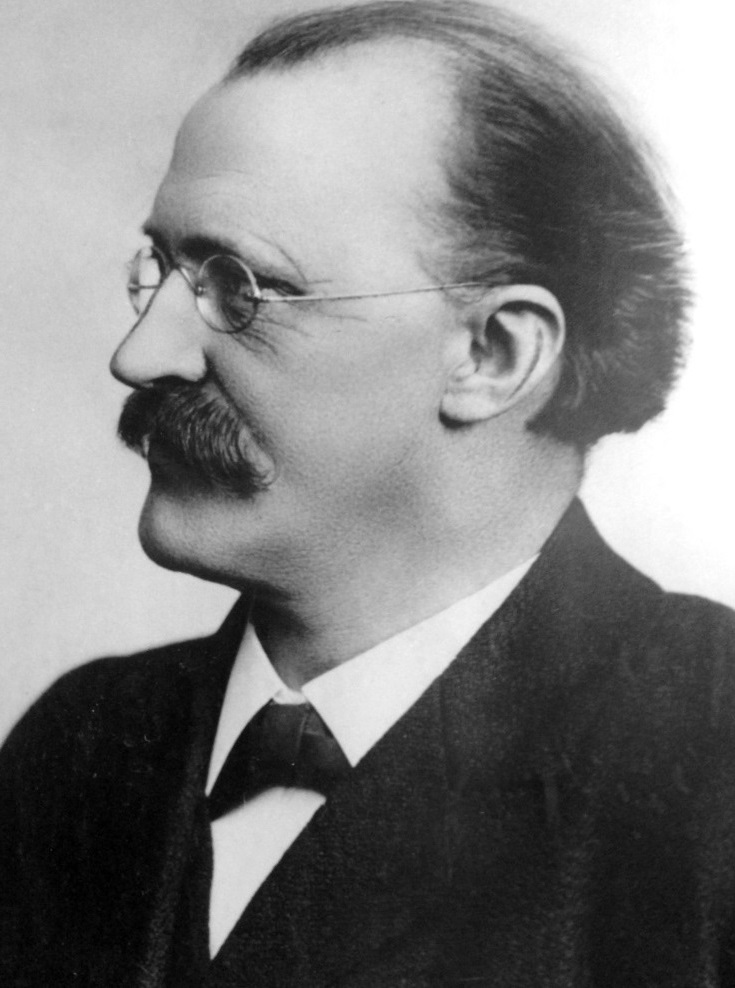
- Born: 15 July 1850; Borgund Municipality, Norway
- Died: 21 November 1927 (aged 77)
- Occupations: Educator, linguist and politician
- Children: Leiv Heggstad; Olav Heggstad

Kristoffer Marius Hægstad (15 July 1850 – 21 November 1927) was a Norwegian educator, linguist and politician for the Liberal Party. A proponent for landsmål, he was the first chairman of Norigs Maallag.

== Personal life ==
Hægstad was born in Borgund Municipality as the son of jurist Ole Hægstad and Charlotte Abigael Tonning. He was married to Pernele Larsdotter Midgaard, and was the father of Leiv Heggstad and engineering professor Olav Heggstad.

== Career ==
Hægstad edited the newspapers Namdals Tidende and Namdalsposten, and was a co-founder of Nordtrønderen. He was elected member of the Parliament of Norway in 1891 and 1897; also serving as deputy representative during the terms 1889–1891 and 1895–1897. He was appointed professor at the University of Oslo from 1899 to 1920. Among his works are Gamalt trøndermaal from 1899, Hildinakvadet from 1900, and Gamalnorsk ordbok med nynorsk tyding from 1909 (jointly with Alf Torp). He was the first chairman of Norigs Maallag, from its foundation in 1906.

Cultural offices
New office	Chairman of Noregs Mållag; 1906–1909	Succeeded by Jørgen Løvland
