= Hartvig Nissen (gymnast) =

Norwegian gymnast (1857–1924)

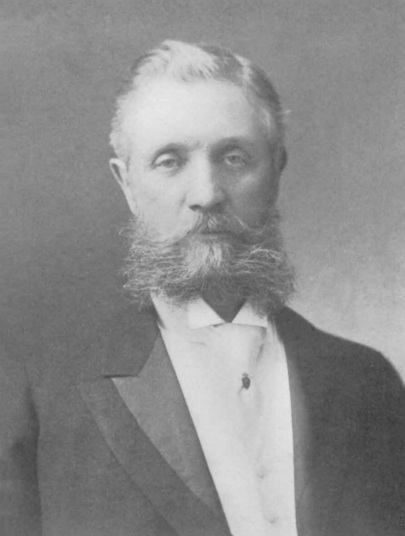
- Nissen in 1921

Personal information
- Born: 1857
- Died: February 4, 1924 (aged 66–67)
- Relatives: Hartvig Nissen (father)

Hartvig Nissen (1857 – February 4, 1924) was a Norwegian gymnast primarily active in Norway and the USA. He later pursued a career in politics.

== Early life and education ==
Nissen was born in the neighborhood of Kongshavn, near Oslo, in 1857. He was the 8th child out of 10 in his family. His father, Ole Hartvig Nissen, was the owner and principal of a small private school. Nissen graduated from high school in 1872. An eye injury suffered during a childhood snowball fight prevented him from entering military school.

== Gymnastics career ==
As a young man, Nissen joined the Merchant's Club, Singing Club and Christiania Turnforening (Gymnastics Club). He began teaching gymnastics in April 1875 and was the instructor of gymnastics in the Latin School of Drammen. He also taught at the gymnastics clubs of the cities of Drammen, Holmestrand and Kongsberg in Norway. Nissen later became a Teacher's Assistant and the Principal of Oslo Turnforening.

Around 1879, he studied the German system of gymnastics in Dresden, Saxony. He left Norway for the U.S. on January 26, 1883 and arrived in New York City on February 15, 1883.

=== United States ===
In March 1883 he moved to Washington, D.C., where he visited the German Gymnastics Club a few days after arriving. He obtained a position teaching a class of fourteen women. Within a few weeks he had fifty female students between the ages of 13 and 50 attending his classes. He also held classes at the Franklin School until the spring of 1885.

In September 1883 he opened a high school in an armory on E Street.

On January 4, 1884, he held an exhibition at his high school with girls and boys performing Swedish gymnastics, wand exercises, dumbbells, fancy steps, Swedish folk dances and games. This was the first time Swedish gymnastics and folk dances were officially exhibited in the United States.

In September 1883, he rented a three-story building at 903 16th street, two blocks from the White House, and named it "The Swedish Health Institute".

Nissen is thought to have introduced the study of Swedish Gymnastics, and Swedish Massage to the United States.

== Personal life ==
Nissen married a Swedish woman, Helene Peterson, in the summer of 1884. She had been his assistant since the opening of the Swedish Health Institute. He died of heart failure on February 4, 1924.

== Bibliography ==
Nissen has a large bibliography. Some of his books include:

- ABC of the Swedish System of Educational Gymnastics: A Practical Hand-Book for School Teachers and the Home
- Gymnastic Systems
- Health by Exercises without Apparatus
- Practical Massage and Corrective Exercises with Applied Anatomy
- Rational Home Gymnastics
- School Gymnastic-Card System
- A Manual on Swedish Movements and Massage Treatments
