= Hans Hartvig-Møller =

Hans Hartvig Møller
- Born: 1873; Nordborg, Als
- Died: 1953 (aged 79–80); Gentofte
- Occupations: Rector of Gammel Hellerup Gymnasium (1909-1943): (Headmaster, 1909-1918)
- Known for: Co-organizer of the first school trips in Denmark (1897); Founder of "Lommebog for Skoleelever" (1906); Founder of the first student council in Denmark; Founder of the first Scout patrol for boys in Denmark; Co-founder of Det Danske Spejderkorps the first Danish National scout organisation Founder of the first Youth Hostel in Denmark (1919) and agitator for the hiking movement in Denmark

Hans Hartvig Møller (sometimes also written as Hans Hartvig-Møller) (Nordborg, Als 1873-1953) was the Rector (1909-1943) of Gammel Hellerup Gymnasium (GHG) founded in 1894 and originally a private school exclusively for boys, the founder of student council in Denmark, and one of the founders of Danish Scouting.

The Elevråd student council was first established in Denmark in 1909 at Hellerup Gymnasium at the behest of newly appointed headmaster Hartvig Møller.

The first Danish scout organisation Det Danske Spejderkorps was founded December 16, 1910 by Hans Hartvig Møller, Cay Lembcke, Oscar Hansen, P. Nørgaard and E. Bøcher, and the first Scout patrol for boys was organized by Hartvig Møller November 20, 1909 at Gammel Hellerup Gymnasium.

In 1922 his daughter Kirsten was the first female student of Gammel Hellerup Gymnasium.

One road, Hartvig-Møllers Vej situated near Gunderød in Fredensborg Municipality, is named in honour of Hans Hartvig Møller.

== Works ==
- Hans Hartvig Møller: "Elevraad". Vor Ungdom, 53. Aargang, 1931-32, hæfte X, marts 1932. (p. 457)
