= Battle of the Systems =

Controversy in exercise trends

The Battle of the Systems was a controversy over the most effective system of exercise and calisthenics that spanned from the 1830s to the early 1920s, consisted of different systems of exercise mostly in a gymnastic or calisthenic-type format. It raged in the United States as states mandated physical education systems.

== Systems ==
=== German gymnastics ===
Started by Johann Guts Muth and Friedrich Ludwig Jahn, used large fixed apparatus, vaulting and marching. Jahn felt that physical conditioning was essential for a strong nation. The German system had a "militaristic" view of fitness, with a very strict, formal style of physical training: Jahn's purpose in promoting what he called the Turnverein movement was to mold the German youth into strong citizens. It was introduced to America by Charles Beck, a German immigrant. Although they were based on the ideas and work of Friedrich Jahn, the American system was less nationalistic.

=== Swedish gymnastics ===
Sometimes called the "Swedish Movement Cure," founded by Pehr Henrik Ling, was a health-oriented approach and recognized for inherent medical values. The Swedish "light gymnastics" used no apparatus, consisting of calisthenics and exercises. It was freer and less rigid than the German system. The Swedish system was made popular in America from the 1880s under Hartvig Nissen and Nils Posse.

=== Delsarte system ===
A French system created by François Delsarte in the 1890s. His system, based on the belief that certain exercises contributed more to poise, grace, beauty and health, and were therefore more beneficial in improving performances in singing, drama and dance, gained popularity in dance and theatre as well as physical education, though in the latter its popularity was limited and short-lived.

=== Sargent system ===
Founded by Dudley Allen Sargent in the 1800s, it was a system of gymnastics based on both the German and Swedish systems. Sargent constructed many types of apparatus to be used in his program and also experimented in anthropometric measurements. This eclectic system required a thorough medical examination as a basic preliminary to any physical activity.

== Outcome ==
There was no winner proclaimed because popularity varied from region to region and as one would gain a strong foothold, another system would grow in popularity. The public would shift with the latest trend. These systems would all but vanish as science and research would reveal the truth in promoters' claims.
