= Torleiv Hannaas =

Norwegian philologist

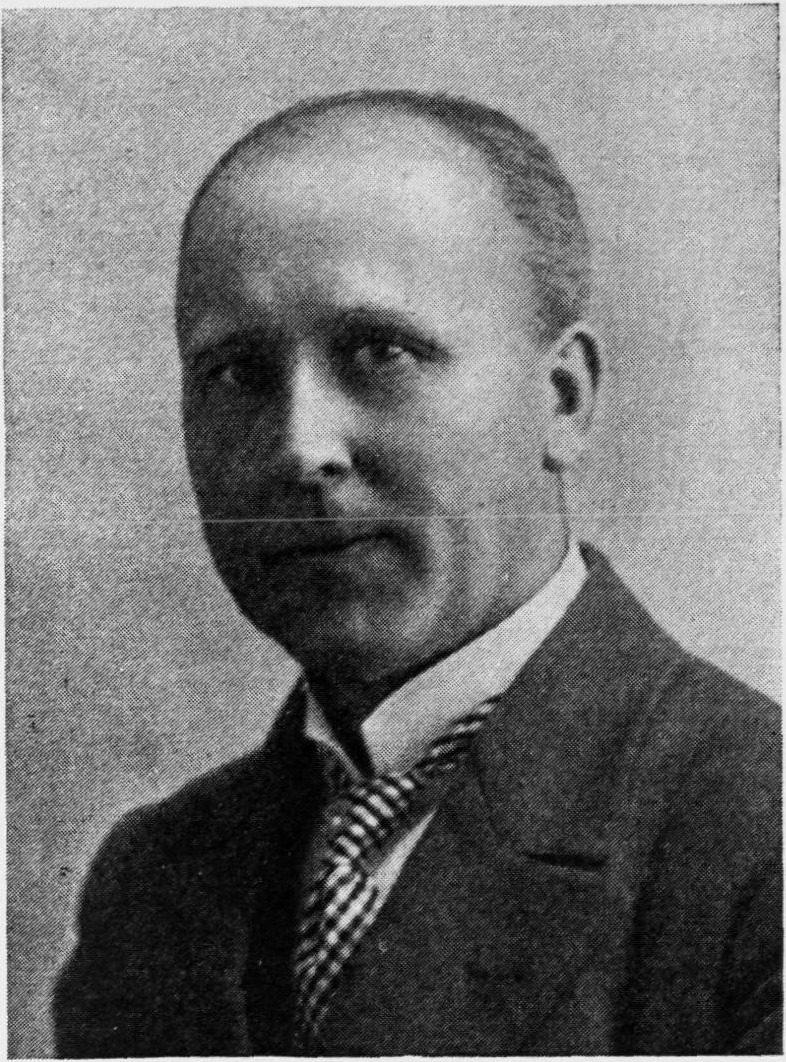
Torleiv Hannaas.

Torleiv Hannaas (Norwegian pronunciation: [ˈtʊ̀lːæɪv ˈhɑnːoːs]; 14 July 1874 – 19 November 1929) was a Norwegian philologist.

He was born in Hornnes as a son of farmers Thomas Nilsson Hannaas (1843–1915) and Anne Tolleivsdotter Vetrhus (1845–1944). In July 1906 he married teacher Ingerd Yttreland (1879–1954). Their daughter Liv married banker Egil Hiis Hauge. Torleiv Hannaas died in November 1929 in Fana.

He became professor at Bergen Museum in 1918. His most important publications was Norske bygder I (1921) and Norske bygder II (1926), about the dialects in Setesdal and Vest-Agder. He founded the Norsk Aarbok in 1920, and is often credited for introducing the term Høgnorsk in an article in 1922. He was the chairman of Noregs Mållag from 1926 to his death.

Cultural offices
Preceded by Knut Liestøl	Chairman of Noregs Mållag; 1926–1929	Succeeded by Gustav Indrebø
