= Bjarne Slapgard =

Norwegian educator and author (1901–1997)

Bjarne Slapgard (11 November 1901 – 25 December 1997) was a Norwegian educator and writer.

Slapgard was born at Verdal Municipality in Nord-Trøndelag, Norway. He taught at Nordmøre folk high school (Nordmøre Folkehøgskule) in Surnadal Municipality in Møre og Romsdal (1931–1938). He was the headmaster of Hardanger folk high school (Hardanger Folkehøgskole) at Lofthus from 1938 to 1957. He worked at Nordbygda school at Frosta Municipality in Trøndelag (1957–1966). In retirement, he moved to Levanger Municipality. He served as chairman of Noregs Mållag from 1970–1971. He also published novels, plays, children's books, short stories and poems. His works included the trilogy Under regnbogen (1981), Under bannstrålen (1983) and Under rose med rubin (1985).

Cultural offices
Preceded by Hans Olav Tungesvik	Chairman of Noregs Mållag; 1970–1971	Succeeded by Steinar Lægreid
