= Hartvig Kiran =

Norwegian author, lyricist and composer

Hartvig Kiran (3 November 1911 – 15 August 1978) was a Norwegian author, lyricist and composer. He was most commonly associated with his broadcasts on the Norwegian Broadcasting Corporation.

== Biography ==
Kiran was born at Ålesund in Møre og Romsdal, Norway. His parents were Hartvig Nikolaisen Kiran (1876-1953) and Elisabeth Pettersson (1886-1967). After artium in 1931, he studied philology at the University of Oslo. In 1938, he took employment in the news room of the Norwegian Broadcasting Corporation (NRK). Following the Occupation of Norway by Nazi Germany, Kiran went into exile to Great Britain from 1941 to 1945. He worked as a newscaster for the Norwegian section of the British Broadcasting Corporation (BBC). After the liberation of Norway in 1945, he continued at NRK and in 1958 he became head of NRK's Information Department.

Kiran was brought in to introduce culture to listeners. He was central in Visens Venner and presented Ønskediktet where people were introduced to Kiran's nynorsk version of Auld Lang Syne. He was the chairman of Noregs Mållag from 1957 to 1958. In addition to writing his own plays, he translated many works for theatre and musicals such as Hamlet and Macbeth.

In 1960, he was awarded the Bastian Prize (Bastianprisen) on the basis of his translations of published works into the Norwegian language. He died in Oslo at the age of 66 in 1978.

Cultural offices
Preceded by Knut Robberstad	Chairman of Noregs Mållag; 1957–1958	Succeeded by Magne Skodvin
Awards
Preceded by Odd Bang-Hansen	Recipient of the Bastian Prize; 1960	Succeeded by Halldis Moren Vesaas
