= Olaus Islandsmoen =

Norwegian politician

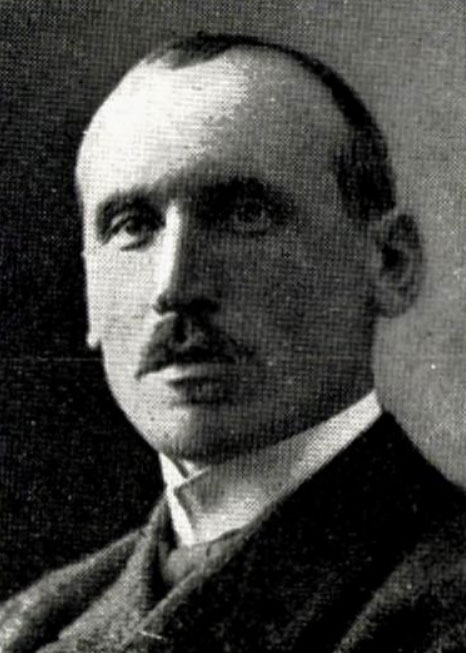
Portrait of Olaus Islandsmoen

Olaus Islandsmoen (1873 in Sør-Aurdal Municipality – 1949) was a Norwegian educator, museologist and politician.

He was headmaster at Vestoppland Folk High School from 1906 to 1939. He was a member of the Parliament of Norway from 1916 to 1918. He was a chairman of Noregs Mållag from 1917 to 1921. He co-founded of the organization Norske Museers Landsforbund, a forerunner of Norges Museumsforbund, in 1918. In the 1930s he was a member of the council of Norges Forsvarsforening.

Cultural offices
Preceded by Fredrik Voss	Chairman of Noregs Mållag; 1917–1921	Succeeded by Halvdan Koht
