= Estate of Heggstad =

1993 California legal case

- Court: California Courts of Appeal First Appellate District
- Full case name: Estate of Halvard L. Heggstad
- Decided: June 21, 1993

Court membership
- Judges sitting: Michael J. Phelan, J. Anthony Kline, John E. Benson

Case opinions
- Affirm

Estate of Heggstad, 16 Cal. App. 4th 943 is a legal case heard by the California Court of Appeal concerning the probate the estate of Halvard L. Heggstad and mislabeling of property within a trust.

== Background ==
On May 10, 1989, Halvard Heggstad created a revocable living trust with him as the trustee and his son Glen P. Heggstad as successor trustee. Halvard placed all the property that he wanted in the trust, including the real property into an attachment to his trust document titled "Schedule A". During drafting a piece of property was mislabeled as "Partnership interest in 100 Independence Drive, Menlo Park, California.", in which Halvard had an undivided 34.78% interest as a tenant in common. The Menlo Park Property remained in his name as an unmarried man and there was no grant deed reconveying this property to his trust. A month after drafting his testamentary documents, Halvard married Nancy Rhodes Heggstad. Nancy was not provided for in the will or trust, but was entitled to one third of the estate outside the trust as her intestate share as an omitted spouse.

After Halvard died on October 20, 1990, Glen became the successor trustee and petitioned the probate court in San Mateo for disposition of the Menlo Park Property, claiming the language in the trust allows the creation of a separate trust and the property was not part of his father's estate. Nancy objected and appealed the decision claiming the property was not transferred to the trust by a properly executed document or by operation of law and that the trustee had a conflict of interest as a beneficiary of the trust. The appeals court determined that a written declaration of trust by the decedent was sufficient to create a trust and a separate deed transferring the property to the trust was not required. A written declaration of trust by the owner of real property is sufficient to create a trust in that property.

== California Probate Code 850 ==
California Probate Code 850 provide similar, but broader remedies. A “Heggstad petition” is a common-law label for a petition asking the probate court to confirm that property belongs to a trust even though record title was never formally transferred to the trustee.

A Probate Code section 850 petition is a broader statutory procedure for resolving competing claims to real or personal property involving a trust, estate, conservatorship, or guardianship.
