= Olav Heggstad =

Norwegian civil engineer (1877–1954)

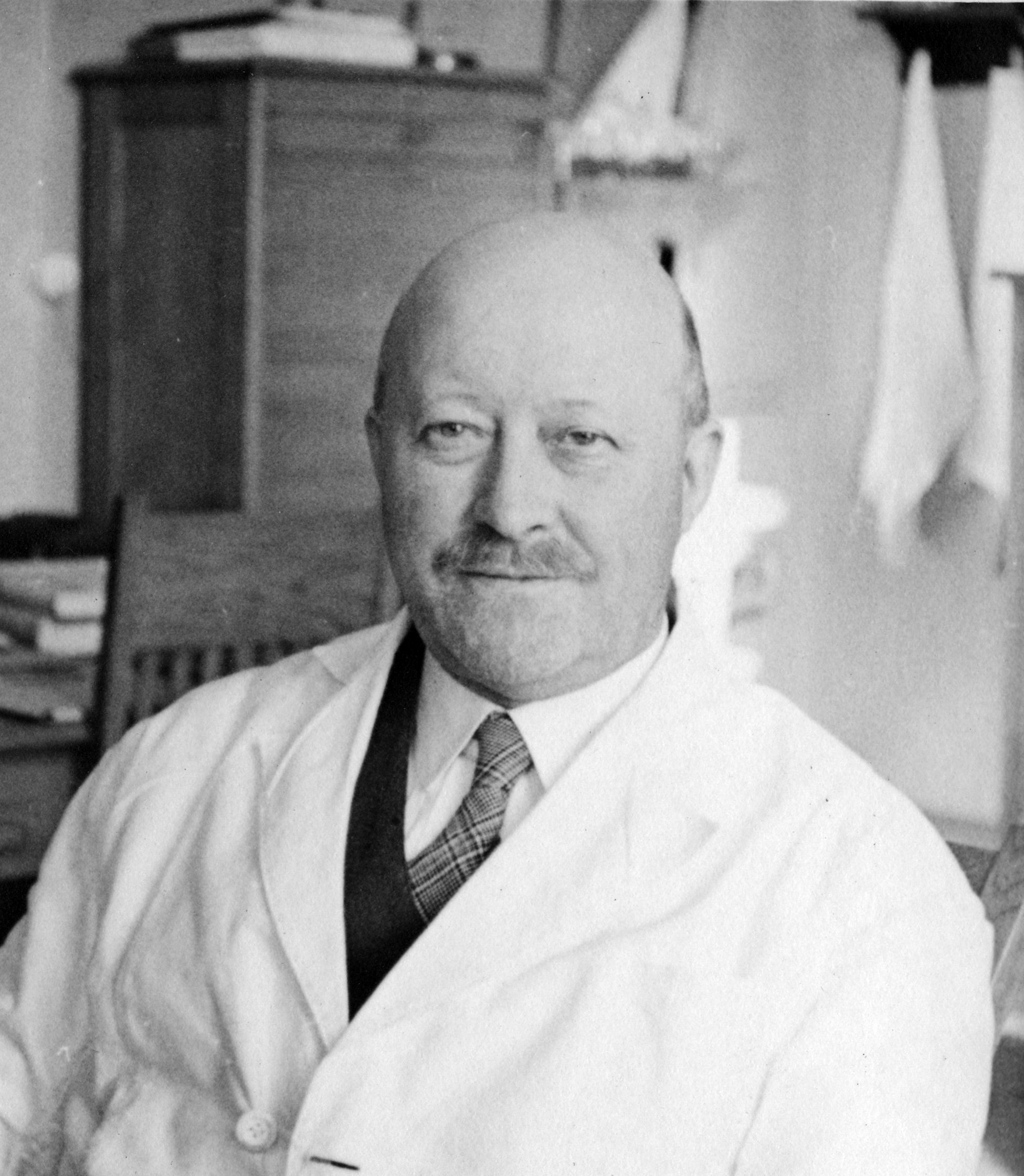
- Olav Heggstad in 1940
- Born: March 5, 1877; Namsos
- Died: May 2, 1954 (aged 77); Trondheim
- Education: Dresden University of Technology
- Employer: Norwegian Institute of Technology
- Known for: Development of electricity and hydropower in Norway
- Title: Professor and chancellor

Olav Heggstad (March 5, 1877 – May 2, 1954) was a Norwegian civil engineer and professor at the Norwegian Institute of Technology.

Heggstad was born in Namsos, the son of the professor Marius Hægstad and Pernele Larsdotter Midgaard (1852–1935). Heggstad passed his engineering exams at the Trondheim Technical School in 1896. After a few years of employment at the Canal Authority (Norwegian: Kanalvesenet, the forerunner of today's Norwegian Water Resources and Energy Directorate) from 1897 to 1902 as well as the Holmenkollen Line, he studied further at the Dresden University of Technology from 1899 to 1900 to learn more about hydropower and electrical engineering. After practical experience at Siemens & Halske in Germany, he returned to Norway to participate in developing the Kykkelsrud power plant. Later he was employed by Norsk Hydro in the first phase of construction of power stations to provide electricity to the company's factories at Rjukan.

He worked as an engineer at Sam Eyde's engineering office in Oslo. At the age of 30, Heggstad was placed in charge of dam and tunnel construction at Møsvatn in connection with the Vemork hydroelectric plant. He was later given similar managerial responsibilities for construction of the Såheim Hydroelectric Power Station, and also at Rjukan. Heggstad was one of several young engineers used by Sam Eyde to develop the Norsk Hydro company. These projects were pioneering work, and when it was opened Vemork was the world's largest power station.

He was a professor of hydraulic engineering at the Norwegian Institute of Technology, where he served as the institute's rector from 1929 to 1932 and from 1942 to 1945.

== Academic career ==
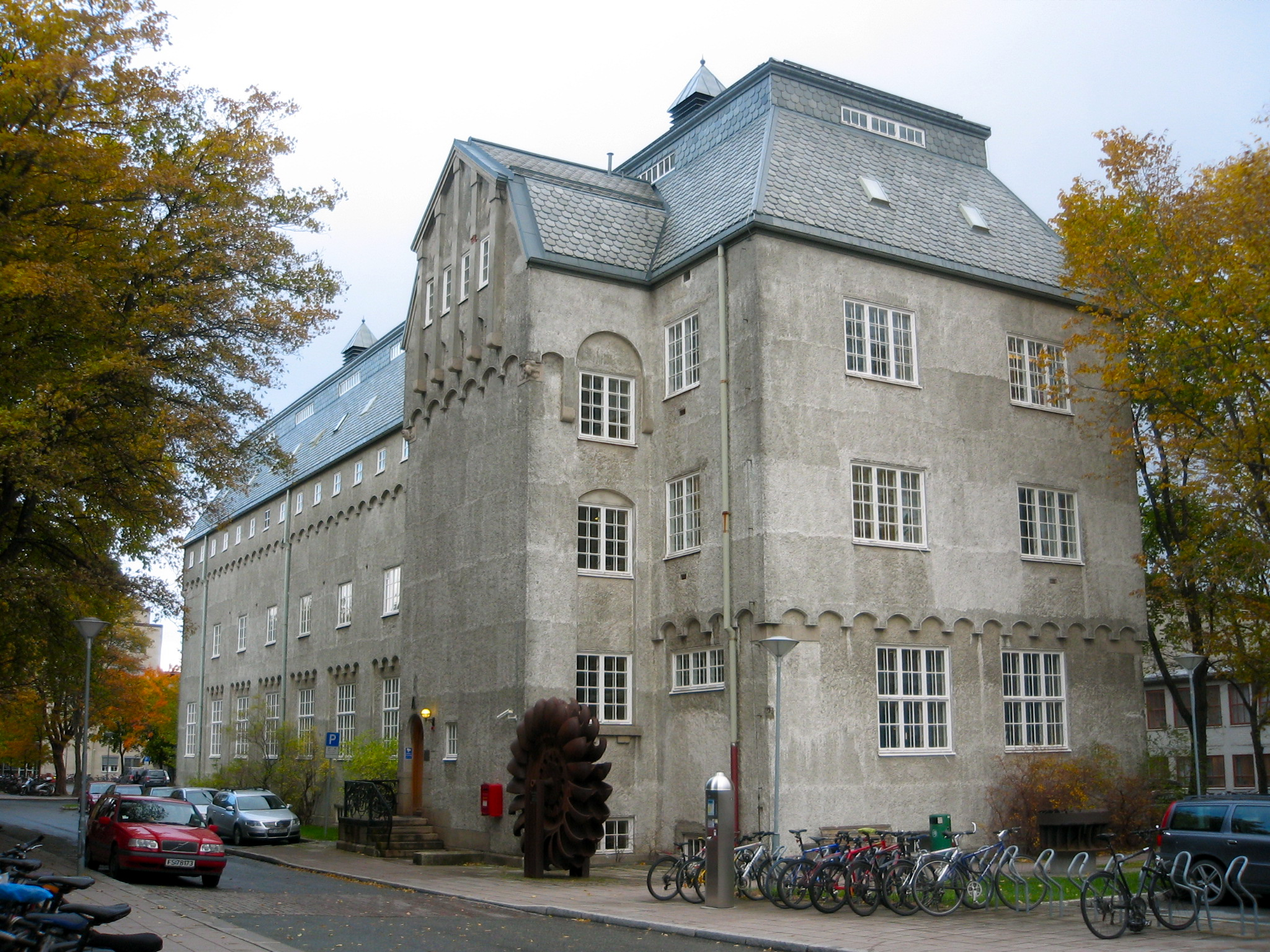
The hydropower laboratory at the Norwegian University of Science and Technology (formerly the Norwegian Institute of Technology) was and still is an important venue for experiments with hydropower equipment. Heggstad was the initiator in establishing the laboratory.

For most of his life, Heggstad was a professor of hydraulic engineering at the Norwegian Institute of Technology, and he trained the civil engineers that developed Norway's power supply during and after the Second World War. He was among the first group of professors when the Norwegian Institute of Technology was founded in 1910. Together with Gudmund Sundby in the mechanical engineering department and experts from the electrical engineering department, he was a central force in hydropower and electric power in Norway in the early 1900s. Heggstad was the initiator in creating the hydropower laboratory at the institute, where research on hydroelectric turbines is still carried out. Heggstad also had organizational skills and served as chancellor of the Norwegian Institute of Technology from 1929 to 1933.

Heggstad was an eminently practical professor, with extensive industrial experience from his past. While employed at the Norwegian Institute of Technology, he also remained engaged in industry through his own consulting firm, which had no fewer than 30 employees. Several other professors had similar extensive engagements, and one student at the institute stated: "During my time as a student, the professors traveled over hill and dale on private business to the detriment of the school and its students."

The difficult economic times of the Great Depression in the late 1920s and throughout the 1930s corresponded to Heggstad's term as chancellor, and at his inauguration he predicted that "difficulties will come and persist for many years yet." He therefore believed that the institute needed to actively engage in applied research and development for the benefit of Norway's industry, and he also stated that Norway must assert itself "in the economic war that is now being carried out among countries around the world."

=== 1919 Electricity Commission ===
In 1919, Heggstad was engaged by the Norwegian parliament as a member of the 1919 Electricity Commission to create a national plan for power supply. The commission was tasked with studying the situation, making plans, and proposing laws for power. Electrical power faced several limitations at this time, both technical and organizational, that the commission was intended to solve. Heggstad was the leading specialist with technical responsibility for the national plan. He set up a very generous budget for the national plan and, among other things, engaged 44 engineers to assist him. The commission estimated that it would need 500,000 kroner for its first term, whereas the parliament's original grant was only for 50,000 kroner. These large ambitions were not understood by all, but in the end the parliament unanimously granted the amount requested. This was seen as an opportunity not only for coordinating power stations but also for electricity exports to Denmark.

=== Second World War ===
Fredrik Vogt was the chancellor of the Norwegian Institute of Technology at the beginning of the Second World War. He resigned in protest in the fall of 1941 because the ministry would have influence over student admissions. The ministry gave preference to applicants that had served in the Nordland Regiment, Norwegian Legion, or Germanske SS Norge.

Heggstad agreed to be appointed chancellor in January 1942. Because many employees refused to work with the new Quisling regime, he exercised virtually sole management of the Norwegian Institute of Technology. Heggstad was given full authority based on the leader principle of the Reich Commissariat for Norway. A minority of the professors at the institute agreed that school should submit because "according to Section 12 of the Law on Higher Education, the chancellor is charged with ensuring that important government decisions are carried out." The other professors went underground, and a secret professorial maintained contact with the Home Front resistance leaders from the fall of 1943 onward. They exerted pressure to block job vacancies at the institute and took part in a student boycott of classes in the fall of 1944. After that, the school was virtually deserted. Heggstad primarily worked in administration during the war. He resigned from the position immediately after the war and retired on September 1, 1945.

The professorship in hydraulic engineering became vacant when Heggstad retired and stood empty for twelve years until a new professor was appointed to it.

== Selected works ==
- Vassbygg. I (Hydraulic Engineering I, 1924–1927)
- Vassbygning (Hydraulic Engineering, 1926–1930)
- Vassbygging (Hydraulic Engineering, 1926–1945)
