= Noregs Mållag =

Organization in Norway advocating Nynorsk

Noregs Mållag (literally "Language Organisation of Norway") is the main organisation for Norwegian Nynorsk (New Norwegian), one of the two official written standards of the Norwegian language. In the Norwegian language conflict, it advocates the use of Nynorsk. It has a structure with local groups, including the youth organisation, Norsk Målungdom. It has approx. 16,000 members (2025).

== Chairmen/leaders ==
The title "chairman" was changed to "leader" in 1982.

- Since 2020 Peder Lofnes Hauge
- 2016–2020 Magne Aasbrenn
- 2013–2016 Marit Åkre Tennø
- 2009–2013 Håvard B. Øvregård
- 2006–2009 Hege Myklebust
- 2005–2006 Nils T. Ulvund
- 2005 Steinulf Tungesvik
- 2003–2005 Endre Otto Brunstad
- 2002–2003 Håvard Teigen
- 2002 Vidar Lund
- 1999–2002 Oddmund L. Hoel
- 1997–1999 Liv Ingebrigtsen
- 1994–1997 Olav Randen
- 1993–1994 Jan Olav Fretland
- 1991–1993 Kristian Ihle Hanto
- 1989–1991 Marta A.Ø. Falch
- 1987–1989 Jon Låte
- 1984–1987 Ola E. Bø
- 1981–1984 Maria Høgetveit Berg
- 1979–1981 Dagfinn Hjellbrekke
- 1977–1979 Kjell Snerte
- 1975–1977 Ola Breivega
- 1973–1975 Johan Krogsæter
- 1971–1973 Steinar Lægreid
- 1970–1971 Bjarne Slapgard
- 1965–1970 Hans Olav Tungesvik
- 1963–1965 Trygve Bjørgo
- 1960–1963 Ivar Eskeland
- 1958–1960 Magne Skodvin
- 1957–1958 Hartvig Kiran
- 1952–1957 Knut Robberstad
- 1949–1952 Asbjørn Øverås
- 1946–1949 Hans Eidnes
- 1936–1946* Knut Markhus
- 1932–1936 Anders Todal
- 1930–1932 Gustav Indrebø
- 1926–1929 Torleiv Hannaas
- 1925–1926 Knut Liestøl
- 1921–1925 Halvdan Koht
- 1917–1921 Olaus Islandsmoen
- 1915–1917 Fredrik Voss
- 1912–1915 Nikolaus Gjelsvik
- 1909–1912 Jørgen Løvland
- 1906–1909 Marius Hægstad

* including hiatus from 1942 to 1945 during the German occupation of Norway.
