= Endre Brunstad =

Norwegian linguist

Endre Otto Brunstad (born June 1, 1967) is a Norwegian linguist and professor of Nordic studies education at the University of Bergen's Institute of Linguistics, Literature, and Aesthetic Studies. Brunstad is from Sykkylven Municipality in Møre og Romsdal County. Brunstad was chairman of the Norwegian Language Association (Norwegian: Noregs Mållag) from 2003 to 2005, and he holds a PhD in Nordic linguistics. His research interests include language planning, linguistic purism, and language teaching.
