= Norsk Målungdom =

Norwegian youth language organization

Norsk Målungdom (NMU, sometimes anglicised as The Norwegian Youth Language Association) is an organization of youth working to protect and promote the Nynorsk written standard of Norwegian and the Norwegian dialects. It is the youth organization of Noregs Mållag - the Norwegian Language Association. The organization was founded in 1961 as The Norwegian Student's and Pupil's Language Association (NSEM) and initially operated as independent from Noregs Mållag. In 1969, NSEM entered into a cooperative arrangement whereupon it became the official youth wing of Noregs Mållag, and in 1972 it changed its name to Norsk Målungdom. NMU has not enjoyed the same continuity and membership integrity as Noregs Mållag. As NMU often has or does harbour more radical or controversial opinions or policies, it has from time to time complicated cooperation between the two organizations. There have been disagreements on how and why awareness of the cause should be spread, and in how the community should place itself on issues not immediate to the cause – for instance in the case of Norwegian-EU relations – and turbulence within NSEM/NMU has occasionally led to a relationship that is directly hostile. NMU has a membership fluctuating around 850 members. NMU had been more inclined towards a left-leaning political stance, however today it remains politically independent. The organisation is headquartered in Oslo, in an office space currently shared with Noregs Mållag. Since 2001, NMU has awarded Dialektprisen (The dialect award) to norwegian personalities who proficiently make use of their dialect in popular media.

== History ==
The organization's initial name reflect its organizational structure during the 1960's and 70's, when NMU operated largely through local student and pupil associations at high schools, colleges and universities. Prior to its foundation in 1961, efforts had been made to attempt such organizations around the country for nearly a century, and many branches of NMU therefore precede the organization. Målvinarlaget, founded in 1871 at a teacher's college in Stord, is often respected as the first instance of an organized language association among youth. In the decades following, several such organizations were founded, for instance at the teacher's college in Elverum and Tromsø (1898), the latter of which remaining to date. The thought of federating these individual associations under a national one, was however not significant until much later in the 20th century. This is parallel to the struggle of Noregs Mållag in uniting the individual associations into a national one, which was also difficult due to historic resistance to centralism that local communities often had inherent to them.

The constituent assembly of NSEM was held at Vinstra on 3rd of August 1961, a week prior to the general assembly of Noregs Mållag where NSEM was received with open arms by its new sister association. Its relationship to Noregs Mållag was, however, only formalised in 1969. NSEM's infancy was characterised by weak coordination between its local chapters, and from 1967/68, NSEM held its first annual general assembly. Until 1968, the student's chapter in Oslo stood at the helm of the organisation, as the executive board met in the city. Between 1968 and 1970, it relocated to Bergen, but the change was reverted back to Oslo, where it established a permanent secretariat that remains today.

The 1970's were marked by internal conflict when the outreach programme and a charter of principles came up for debate. Two camps had emerged; the dominant national camp (influenced by the Workers' Communist Party) and the social camp (tied to the Socialist Left). The executive board, which met in Bergen at the time, embodied the national camp, and sought Nynorsk as the sole written language. Whereas the Oslo chapter, for the social camp, stood for a more liberal policy. The national camp came out on top, however through a semantic compromise in the charter: "NMU shall strive towards a liberation of the language for all norwegians, in speech and in writing".

== See also ==
- Studentmållaget i Oslo
