= Suffrajitsu =

Woman's self-defence technique

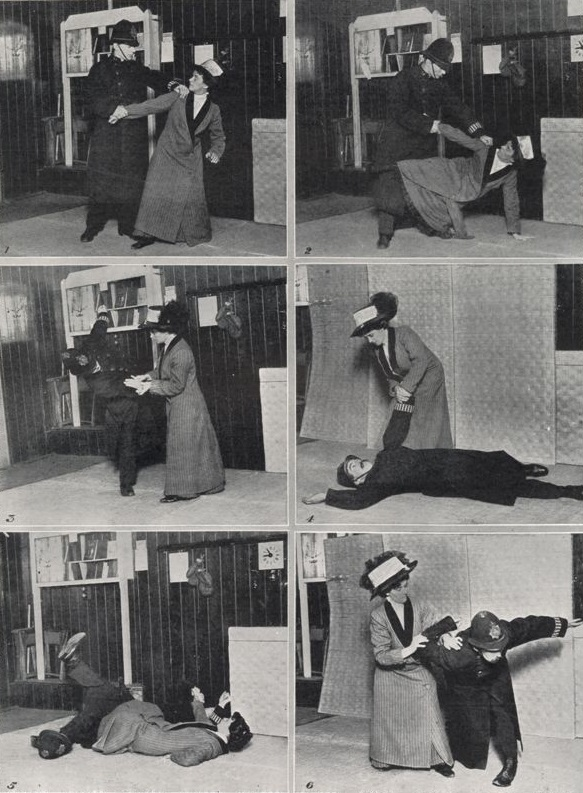
- Edith Garrud demonstrating jujutsu techniques on a volunteer dressed as a police constable
- Focus: Self-defence
- Hardness: Full contact
- Country of origin: United Kingdom
- Famous practitioners: Edith Margaret Garrud
- Ancestor arts: Jujitsu, Judo

Suffrajitsu is a term used to describe the application of martial arts or self-defence techniques by members of the Women's Social and Political Union during 1913/14. The term derives from a portmanteau of suffragette and jiu-jitsu and was coined by an anonymous English journalist during March 1914.

During the Edwardian period, jujutsu was promoted as a way to foster women's self defence, autonomy and health, initially in the United Kingdom and then elsewhere in the Western world.

In contemporary usage, "suffrajitsu" describes the suffragettes' techniques of visible 'self-defence, sabotage and subterfuge' against the police and other aggressors, whilst promoting the benefits of jujitsu as a 'free activity' and a form of self-defense for dealing with both domestic violence in the home, and public attacks to women.

== Etymology ==
The term "suffragette" was first used in 1906 pejoratively by the journalist Charles E. Hands in the London Daily Mail describing female activists working for women's suffrage, in particular members of the WSPU. The latter, however, embraced the term and used it to distinguish their own, radical and militant approach from that of more staid and law-abiding "suffragist" organisations such as the National Union of Women's Suffrage Societies.

Martial arts instructor Edith Garrud believed the term "Ju-Jutsuffragettes" originated from Health & Strength Magazine prior to 1910.

The term 'Suffrajitsu' was coined by an anonymous English journalist in a widely republished article first issued in March 1914 and has subsequently been re-popularised by the Suffrajitsu: Mrs. Pankhurst's Amazons graphic novel series (2015).

== Style of engagement and contemporary influence ==
Suffrajitsu drew upon the techniques of the Japanese jujutsu teachers in London during the Edwardian period. Women in particular were seen as ideal to engage in Jujitsu, as their smaller on average builds allowed them an advantage in allowing their opponent to underestimate them based on their being the 'fairer/weaker' sex and then using their jujitsu to topple larger opponents.

Outside of the training suffragettes received related to ju-jitsu, weapons were also frequently taken into account by their practicality, to prevent attack on their persons, both domestically and by the police. Members of the WSPU Bodyguard (see below) were issued with Indian clubs for use as weapons. Women learned to defend themselves with everyday items of clothing such as the hatpin, used by Edwardian women to hold their large hats in place which could at times reach up to 16 inches in length, either to disarm or maim. Flora Drummond, known as 'The General' for wearing a military style uniform, Helen Ogston, Teresa Billington-Greig and Maud Arncliffe Sennett were each known to carry around whips, to intimidate opponents. At the Battle of Glasgow (1914), suffragettes engaged with police by deploying hidden barbed wire as a stalling tactic.

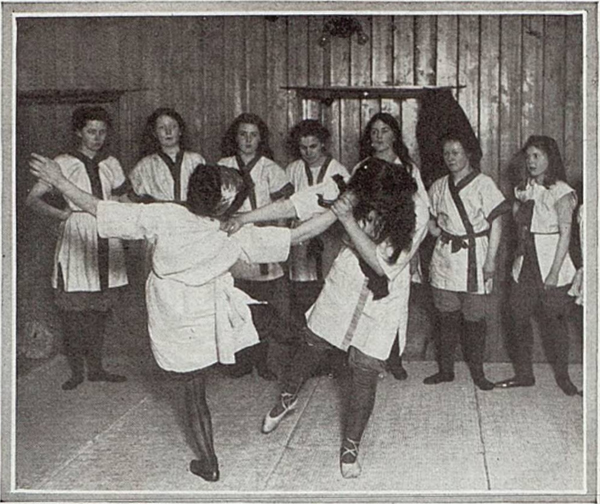
Edith Garrud's dojo

== History ==
Ju-jitsu was first demonstrated in London in 1892 by Tetsujiro Shidachi and later promoted in England by the Bartitsu founder and practitioner Edward Barton-Wright, who introduced Asian martial arts to the middle-classes between 1899 and 1902. Unusually for Edwardian-era "antagonistics" (combat sports) clubs, lessons at the Bartitsu Club were available to women as well as men.

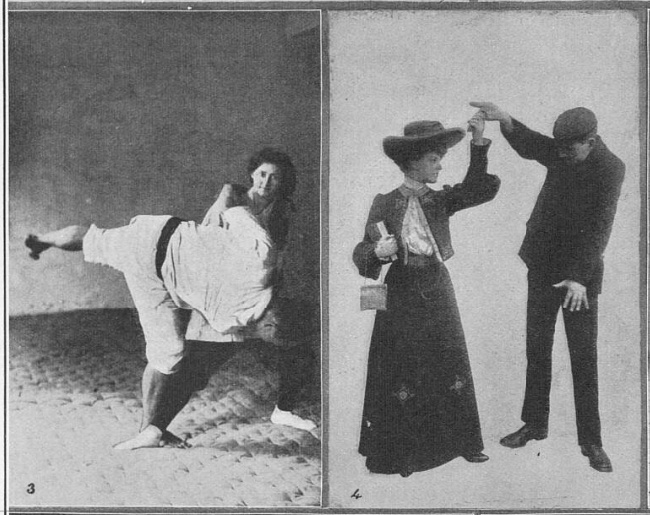
Phoebe Roberts

In the interest of women practitioners and writing in the Daily Mirror in 1903, Evelyn Sharp called for 'women [to] take the special ladies classes offered by (former Bartitsu Club instructor Sadakazu) Uyenishi in Golden Square'. The specific classes being offered taught by Emily Diana Watts; who herself learnt from training at the Oxford Street dojo of Uyenishi's former associate Yukio Tani, along with other 'lady instructors' like Phoebe Roberts (1887–1937) who also taught Judo alongside Uyenishi by December 1904 at the Golden Square school. Uyenishi, remarking on woman learning ju-jitsu, was quoted as noting that "Balance and quickness will always win, and women are always quick." Coupled with the heightened position of Japan as a nation state after the Anglo-Japanese Alliance and the victory over Russia in 1905 based partly on the word of the Japanese army claiming Judo was their secret weapon and hyperbolic claims of jujutsu teachers and sportswriters, there was an inclination in Edwardian English society to learn about 'jiu-jitsu', and the art was taught to young women at Girton College and Newnham College.

By 1905 Watts began teaching self-defence lessons to other high society women such as Duchess Bedford and by 1906 began teaching Jujitsu classes at the Princes Skating Club, Knightsbridge, also publishing The Fine Art of Jujutsu. Other female students of this style included Marie Studholme who trained under Tani in 1907. Ju-jitsu parties became all the rage, instructing upper and middle class in the art of self-defence in their homes, or at afternoon tea.

In 1908, Edith Garrud took over women's classes at the Golden Square School when Uyenishi left England. Garrud also founded the 'Suffragettes Self-Defence Club' in 1909, a suffragettes-only Jujutsu club, which from 1911 moved to the Palladium Academy, in Argyll Street.

The requirement for suffragette self-defence was reinforced by events such as the Black Friday Raid, wherein plain clothes police officers had allegedly physically and sexually assaulted unarmed women attempting to force entry to the House of Commons during a "Raid on Parliament" protest action.

Even after the dissolution of the more violent tactics used by the WSPU in 1914, in 1918 when Christabel Pankhurst was running for office for the Smethwick seat at the General Election, her supporters used jujutsu to deter protestors rallying against her running for the seat. With the founding of the Budokwai in 1918, Jujitsu and Judo began to attain non-political and international followings and were increasingly taught once again primarily as sport or for self-defence. The first female practitioner, Katherine White-Cooper, entering the Budokwai in April 1919.

== Recreational activity or 'The Soft-Art' ==
Suffragetto board

Jujitsu was promoted as a way not only to help defend women but to for their mental and physical health and well-being. The suffragette movement (like the feminist movement to other contact and non-violent sport later on) promoted its recreational usage; The 1908 board game Suffragetto introduced a then-highly political topic into the domestic sphere, framing and engaging the issue in a more positive light for a wider audience. In this manner, self-defence could be marketed as a sport, hobby or entertainment rather than being pejoratively labelled by the wider society as an aggressive or niche activity for women. Performers and publicists like the strongman Eugen Sandow, promoted Jujitsu for women in his magazine on physical culture as a form of 'rational exercise' which supported 'feminine grace'. Given a heightened interest in national health due to a national report revealing health issues in the United Kingdom, it was also in the national interest to increase public participation in sport. Indeed, in 1913 Edith Garrud's dojo was used as a base for militant suffragettes fleeing from pursuing policemen; hiding their protest implements and changing into jujitsu uniforms gave them the veneer of respectable sportswomen.

=== Promotion through the arts ===
One way of promoting jiu-jitsu to the public was through theatre productions incorporating the style, with female participants performing and demonstrating the style's particular benefits when 'a light slim girl ... was able to throw heavy male opponents with the utmost ease.' In 1904, Roberts and Watts performed with Tani and Uyenishi at Caxton Hall to promote the style, in the guise of stage entertainment, Roberts later performing for the Japan Society in 1906 at the Kew, Regents Park and in 1908 at the Palace Theatre, Manchester. Roberts eventually toured Barcelona demonstrating Jujitsu for female audiences.

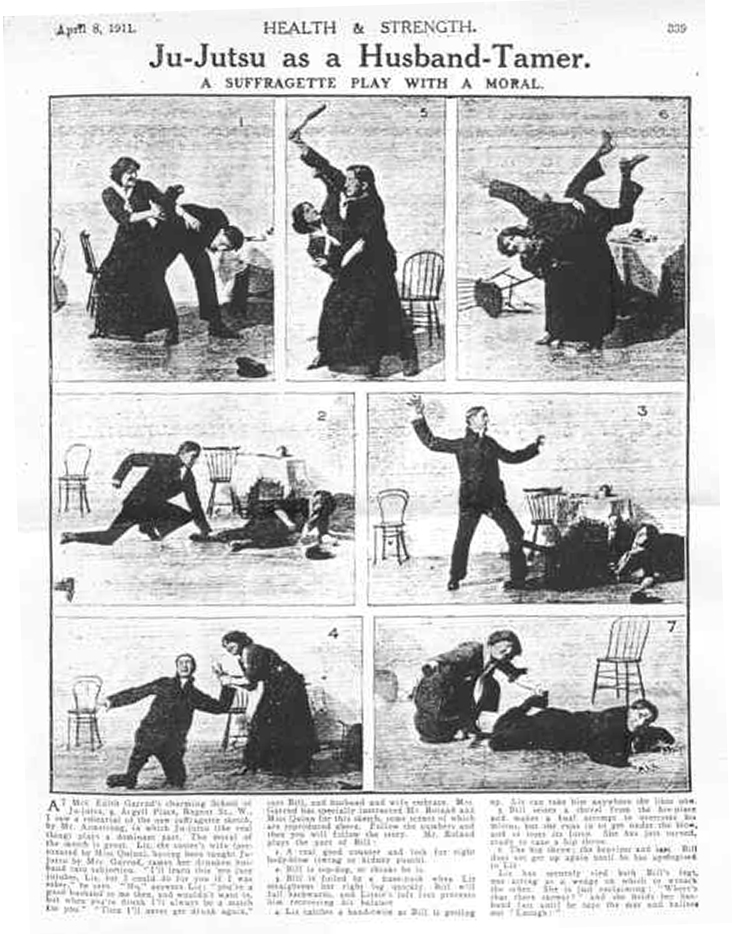
Ju-Jutsu as a Husband-Tamer (1911)

Garrud demonstrated Jujitsu for the WSPU in 1909, and in January 1911 choreographed the fight scenes for the play What Every Woman Ought to Know. In August Garrud wrote about using jiu-jitsu as a form of self-defence in Health and Strength magazine.

"ju-jutsu has over and over again been proved to be the most effective means, ... because it is easy to learn, and because it is, quite apart from its combative value, a splendid exercise; it is the very thing for women as well as men to take up thoroughly." — Edith Garrud, July 23, 1910

=== Filmography ===
Title	Company	Year
Jiu-jitsu Downs the Footpads	Pathé	1907 – in which a woman played by jujutsu instructor Edith Garrud is pursued by two "ruffians" and ultimately defeats both of them with her martial arts skills
Charley Smiler Takes Up Ju-jitsu	Pathé	1911 – features a sequence in which the protagonist is defeated by "Miss U.I. Throwe" in a jujutsu match, after which she hands him a calling card reading "Votes for Women!"

== Militancy in WSPU and The Bodyguard ==
Jujitsu was initially demonstrated and promoted as a style of self-defence, but after the death of women like Mary Jane Clarke and the Conciliation Bills fiasco, the WSPU began to employ more militant forms of protest such as midnight raids on parliamentarians homes as well as nationwide arson and bombing campaigns, albeit the latter two categories of action were only carried out against unoccupied properties.

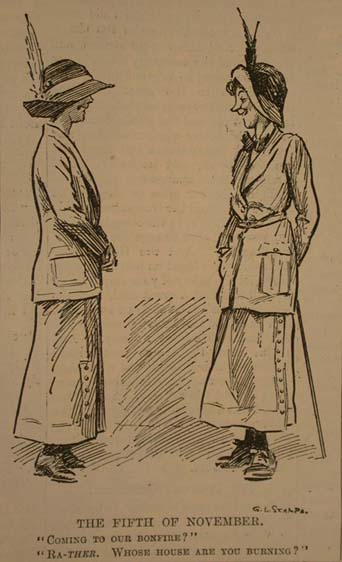
Punch cartoon depicting militant suffragettes

In response to the 'Cat and Mouse Act' (the Prisoners (Temporary Discharge for Ill-Health) Act 1913), the WSPU formed what was termed variously the 'Bodyguard', 'Jiujitsusuffragettes' or 'Amazons'; a group of about 30 suffragettes tasked with protecting suffragettes who had been released from hunger striking in prison from being re-arrested. In order to be eligible to serve with the Bodyguard, women had to be in good physical condition, trained in self-defence and willing to risk their safety and freedom in service of their cause. The organisation engaged Edith Garrud to teach them how to prevent bodily harm against themselves from the police.

Active members of the Bodyguard employed hand-to-hand combat when necessary to protect their charges, but by preference employed techniques of distraction, evasion and misdirection in collaboration with the large, semi-underground network of WSPU sympathisers.

The Bodyguards' most well known hand-to-hand combats engagements with police officers were the "Battle of Glasgow" on 9 March 1914, during which about 30 Bodyguards battled a much larger contingent of police constables and detectives on the stage of St. Andrew's Hall before a shocked audience of some 4500 people, and during their "Raid on Buckingham Palace" on 24 May 1914, when club-wielding suffragette Bodyguards fought police in the streets while attempting to access Buckingham Palace and present a suffrage petition to King George.

The Bodyguard group was disbanded shortly after England declared war against Germany at the outset of the First World War, because the WSPU no longer required protection when they discontinued their militant activism and instead turned to supporting the war efforts.

Bodyguard
Name	Background
Gertrude Harding	Head of Bodyguards, Jujitsu
Kitty Marshall	Jujitsu
Edith Garrud	Trainer for bodyguards, Jujitsu

== Representations in modern popular culture ==
The Suffrajitsu phenomenon has been portrayed in a variety of modern media including:

- The 2015 graphic novel trilogy Suffrajitsu: Mrs. Pankhurst's Amazons
- The 2015 feature film Suffragette, which includes a brief scene in which radical suffragette Edith Ellyn (Helena Bonham Carter) teaches a self-defence class
- Season 3, Episode 5 of the Drunk History (UK) TV comedy show (2017) features a Suffrajitsu segment starring Jessica Hynes as Emmeline Pankhurst
- The 2018 independent documentary No Man Shall Protect Us: the Hidden History of the Suffragette Bodyguards
- Season 5, Episode 5 of the Drunk History (US) comedy TV show (2019) features a Suffrajitsu segment starring Tatiana Maslany as Emmeline Pankhurst and Kat Dennings as Bodyguard Gertrude Harding
- The 2020 and 2022 Netflix movies Enola Holmes and Enola Holmes 2, both starring Millie Bobby Brown in the title role as a martial arts-trained detective in Edwardian London, co-starring Helena Bonham Carter as her radical suffragette/martial artist mother and Susie Wokoma as jujutsu trainer Edith Grayston.
- The 2023 graphic novel The Bodyguard Unit: Edith Garrud, Women's Suffrage, and Jujitsu

== United States ==
In the United States, Japanese instructors such as Yae Kichi Yabe in Rochester, New York began teaching jiu-jitsu to Americans. Women recognized that jiu-jitsu training was not only effective as a means of self-defense but had political implications as well. President Theodore Roosevelt was a vocal advocate of jiu-jitsu training as a way of fostering manliness in American men and preparing United States soldiers for battle. In 1904, Roosevelt hired jiu-jitsu instructor Yoshitsugu Yamashita to train him in the Japanese art of self-defense and made a public display of his training for the press. Feminists annoyed by the posturing of men like Roosevelt, insisted that women were just as capable of learning jiu-jitsu. To prove their point, Martha Blow Wadsworth and Maria Louise ("Hallie") Davis Elkins hired Fude Yamashita, a highly skilled jiu-jitsu instructor and the wife of Yoshiaki Yamashita, to teach a jiu-jitsu class for women and girls in Washington, DC in 1904. The participants of the class included Grace Davis Lee, Katherine Elkins, Jessie Ames, and Re Lewis Smith Wilmer.

Also in 1904 the Physical Training for Women book was released by journalist H. Irving Hancock, based on the Tsutsumi Hōzan-ryū style. The work whilst only showing basic partnered stretches, was taken up for self-defense against 'mashers', with journalist Priscilla Leonard writing how Hancock relayed that 'In Japan the women are not weaker, and in this country they have no right to be [either]'.

American suffragists drew inspiration from the tactics of the British militant suffragettes. Some American women directly participated in the actions initiated by the WSPU and a few even became members of the Bodyguard. Chicago reformer Zelie Emerson was recruited to join the movement by Sylvia Pankhurst who was on a speaking tour in the United States at the time. In 1913, Emerson traveled back to the United Kingdom with Pankhurst and was arrested multiple times for breaking windows to advocate votes for women. Emerson was arrested, sent to prison, and went on hunger-strike. After directly experiencing police brutality and having her skull fractured by police truncheons on two separate occasions, Emerson decided to join the suffragettes in drilling in the use of clubs, boxing, and jiu-jitsu.

Most American suffragists tried to avoid any association with the militant tactics of the British suffragettes. There was no formal organization like the Bodyguard among suffragists in the United States. However, according to historian Wendy Rouse who has studied the origins of the women's self-defense movement in the United States, some American suffragists did advocate self-defense training for women and some groups of suffragists organized small groups to train in secret. Especially after their direct experiences with violence in the 1913 women's suffrage parade, American suffragists recognized that the police would offer them little protection. They began to recognize the value of jiu-jitsu training for their own self-defense. New York suffragist Sofia Loebinger told reporters that she admired the British suffragettes who practiced jiu-jitsu: “Strong situations need strong women, and I am heartily in favor of the movement.” She expressed the belief that “boxing would be a good thing for women if only to teach them to concentrate their minds on one thing at a time. The ballot, for instance.”

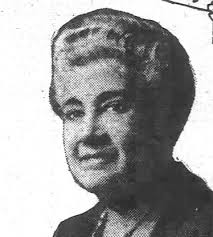
Elkins in 1918

In 1918, American society also began to promote Judo and wrestling as being fit for women's self-defense against the 'mashers' rather than a 'masculine' sport like boxing, with organizations like the Young Women's Christian Association (YWCA) promoting the sports. Women's Judo in Hawaii particularly flourished, with Hilo promoter Miss Harrison, and with Maui promoters including Floy Robinson, Kennette Griffith, Myrtle Nelson, Emma Cawdry, and Elva Class and the first female black belts including Shizuko Murasaki, Matsue Honda, and Yasue Kuniwake. Suffragettes and upper-class socialites often viewed learning martial arts as engaging in female empowerment, unlike boxing whilst working-class women used combat sports, mostly wrestling in vaudeville productions and self-defence where necessary. However most women until the 1940s viewed learning jiu-jitsu as 'manly', something which could scare off prospective marriage partners if the women built up too much muscle, diminishing their 'figures' and 'womanly charms'.

== See also ==
- Sarah Mayer
- Emily Diana Watts
- Edward William Barton-Wright
- Judo in the United Kingdom
- Kinamutay Effeminate Hand Fighting
