= Bartitsu =

Martial arts style

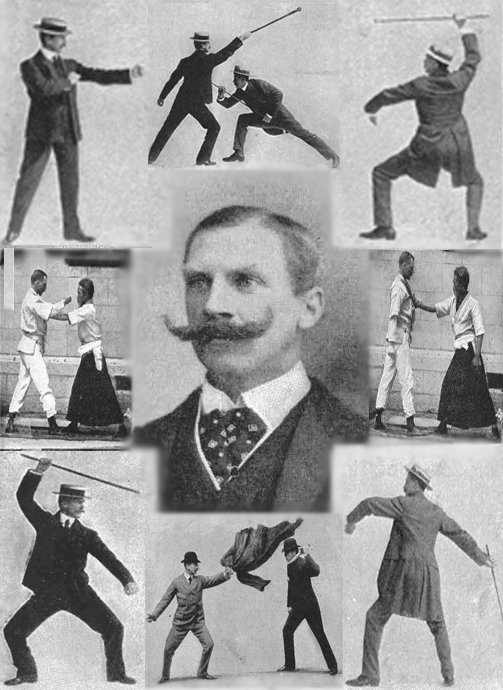
- A portrait of E.W. Barton-Wright, with a montage of Bartitsu self-defence techniques
- Focus: Hybrid
- Country of origin: England
- Creator: Edward William Barton-Wright
- Parenthood: Tenjin Shin'yō-ryū, Kyushin-ryū, Shinden Fudo-ryū, Judo, Schwingen, Savate, Canne de combat, Boxing
- Olympic sport: No

Bartitsu is an eclectic martial art and self-defence method originally developed in England in 1898–1902, combining elements of boxing, jujutsu, cane-fighting, and savate. In 1903, it was immortalised (mistakenly as "baritsu") by Sir Arthur Conan Doyle, author of the Sherlock Holmes mystery stories. Dormant throughout most of the 20th century, Bartitsu has experienced a revival since 2002.

== History ==
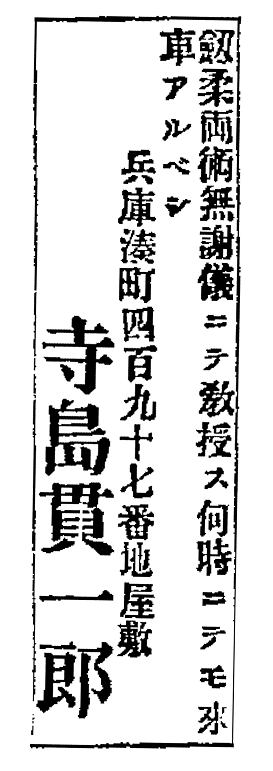
1884, Minato-cho, Kobe City, Hyogo Prefecture, Shinden Fudo Ryu jujutsu of Terajima Kunichiro (寺島貫一郎)

In 1898, Edward William Barton-Wright, an English engineer who had spent the previous three years living in Japan, where he became one of the first Europeans known to have studied jujitsu, returned to England and announced the formation of a "new art of self defence". This art, he claimed, combined the best elements of a range of fighting styles into a unified whole, which he had named Bartitsu. Barton-Wright had previously also studied "boxing, wrestling, fencing, savate, and the use of the stiletto under recognised masters", reportedly testing his skills by "engaging toughs (street fighters) until (he) was satisfied in their application". He defined Bartitsu (バーティツ) as meaning "self defence in all its forms"; the word was a blend of his own surname and of "jujitsu".

As detailed in a series of articles Barton-Wright produced for Pearson's Magazine between 1899 and 1901, Bartitsu was largely drawn from the Shinden Fudo Ryu jujutsu of Terajima Kunichiro (not to be confused with the SFR taijutsu associated with the Bujinkan lineage) and from Kodokan judo. As it became established in London, the art expanded to incorporate combat techniques from other jujutsu styles as well as from British boxing, Swiss schwingen, French savate and a defensive canne de combat (stick fighting) style that had been developed by Pierre Vigny of Switzerland. Bartitsu also included a comprehensive physical culture training system.

In his notes for a lecture delivered to the Japan Society of London in 1901, Barton-Wright wrote:

Under Bartitsu is included boxing, or the use of the fist as a hitting medium, the use of the feet both in an offensive and defensive sense, the use of the walking stick as a means of self-defence. Judo and jujitsu, which are secret styles of Japanese wrestling, (I) would call close play as applied to self-defence.

In order to ensure, as far as it is possible, immunity against injury in cowardly attacks or quarrels, (one) must understand boxing in order to thoroughly appreciate the danger and rapidity of a well-directed blow, and the particular parts of the body which are scientifically attacked. The same, of course, applies to the use of the foot or the stick.

Judo and jujitsu were not designed as primary means of attack and defence against a boxer or a man who kicks you, but are only to be used after coming to close quarters, and in order to get to close quarters it is absolutely necessary to understand boxing and the use of the foot.

== Bartitsu Club ==
Between 1899 and 1902, Barton-Wright set about publicising his art through magazine articles, interviews and a series of demonstrations or "assaults at arms" at various London venues. He established the Bartitsu Academy of Arms and Physical Culture, known as the Bartitsu Club, which was located at 67b Shaftesbury Avenue in Soho. In an article for Sandow's Magazine of Physical Culture vol. 6 (January 1901), journalist Mary Nugent described the Bartitsu Club as "a huge subterranean hall, all glittering, white-tiled walls, and electric light, with 'champions' prowling around it like tigers".

Via correspondence with Professor Jigoro Kano, the founder of Kodokan Judo, and other contacts in Japan, Barton-Wright arranged for Japanese jujutsu practitioners Kaneo Tani, Seizo Yamamoto and the nineteen-year-old Yukio Tani to travel to London and serve as instructors at the Bartitsu Club. Kaneo Tani and Yamamoto soon returned to Japan, but Yukio Tani stayed and was shortly joined by another young jujutsuka, Sadakazu Uyenishi. Swiss master-at-arms Pierre Vigny and wrestler Armand Cherpillod were also employed as teachers at the Club. As well as teaching well-to-do Londoners, their duties included performing demonstrations and competing in challenge matches against fighters representing other combat styles.

Tani, Uyenishi and Cherpillod fought in many such challenges on the music hall wrestling circuit and the facility with which the Japanese athletes were consistently able to defeat much larger and stronger adversaries quickly established the efficacy of jujutsu as a fighting style. Some critics, however, complained that jujutsu's submission rules were "unsporting" because they allowed unfamiliar techniques such as choke holds and joint locks, which were banned in European wrestling styles.

In addition, the Bartitsu Club became the headquarters for a group of fencing antiquarians led by Captain Alfred Hutton, and it served as their base for experimenting with historical fencing techniques, which they taught to members of London's acting elite for use in stage combat. It is likely that the actors Esme Beringer and Charles Sefton, as well as fencer Archibald Corble, were among Hutton's historical fencing students at the Bartitsu Club.

In mid-1901, the curriculum of Bartitsu was further expanded to include breathing exercises under the tuition of Kate Behnke.

As well as the combat gymnasium, the Bartitsu Club incorporated a well-appointed salon equipped with a wide range of electrotherapy machines.

The club was organised on the model of the Victorian sporting club; prospective members submitted their applications to a committee, which at one time included both Captain Alfred Hutton and Colonel George Malcolm Fox, former Inspector-General of the British Army's Physical Training Corps. Promoters of the Club included politicians Herbert Gladstone and Lord Alwyne Compton.

Bartitsu Club membership included Sir Cosmo Duff Gordon, who was later one of the few adult male survivors of the sinking of the RMS Titanic, as well as Captain F. C. Laing of the 12th Bengal Infantry, who subsequently wrote an article on Bartitsu stick fighting techniques, which was published in the Journal of the United Service Institution of India. Other members included expatriate French fencing master and journalist Anatole Paroissien and messrs. Marshall, Collard, Marchant, Roger Noel, Percy Rolt, Lieutenant Glossop and Captains Ernest George Stenson Cooke and Frank Herbert Whittow, both also members of the London Rifle Brigade School of Arms, under the direction of Captain Hutton; and William Henry Grenfell, the 1st Baron Desborough, who was named as the Club president.

Barton-Wright later reported that, during this period, he had challenged and defeated seven larger men within three minutes as part of a Bartitsu demonstration he gave at St. James's Hall. He said this feat earned him a membership in the prestigious Bath Club and also a Royal Command to appear before Edward, Prince of Wales. Barton-Wright then suffered an injury to his hand, due either to a fight in a Kentish country lane or a bicycling accident, which prevented him from appearing before the Prince.

== Self-defence ==
Barton-Wright encouraged members of the Bartitsu Club to study each of the four major hand-to-hand combat styles taught at the club, each of which broadly corresponded to a different "range" of personal combat.

The goal was to master each style well enough that they could be used against the others if needed. This process was similar to the modern concept of cross-training and it can be argued that Bartitsu itself was more in the nature of a cross-training system than a formal martial arts style, though it did include some unique elements (see below).

Based on Barton-Wright's writings upon this subject, it is evident that Bartitsu placed greatest emphasis upon the Vigny cane fighting system at the striking range and upon jujutsu (and, secondarily, the "all-in" style of European wrestling) at the grappling range. Savate and boxing methods were used to segue between these two ranges, or as a means of first response should the defender not be armed with a walking stick. These sports were also practised so that Bartitsu students could learn how to defend against them through the use of jujutsu and Vigny stick fighting.

Barton-Wright spoke of having modified the techniques of boxing and savate for self-defence purposes, as distinct from academic and fitness training or sporting competition, referring to guards that would cause an attacking boxer to injure his own fists and to defences that would cause an attacking kicker to damage his own leg. Thus, the tactics of the unarmed Bartitsu practitioner were to mount an aggressive defence, employing damaging variations of standard boxing and savate guards, and then to finish the fight with jujutsu, which Barton-Wright evidently viewed as a type of secret weapon during an era in which his Shaftesbury Avenue academy was the only place in England where it could be learned. This fusion of aggressive boxing/savate defences with jujutsu was an innovation of Bartitsu as a martial art

The stick fighting component was based on the two fundamental tactics of either feinting/striking pre-emptively or "baiting" the opponent's strike via a position of invitation. Fighting from the style's characteristic high- and double-handed guard positions - assumed so as to make it more difficult for an opponent to "snipe" the weapon-wielding hand - stick strikes and thrusts targeted the opponent's face and head, throat, elbows, hands and wrists, solar plexus, knees and shins. The Bartitsu stick fighter would often incorporate close combat techniques such as trips, throws and takedowns, representing a fusion of the Vigny stick system with jujutsu, which was unique to Bartitsu as a system.

According to interviewer Mary Nugent, Barton-Wright instituted an unusual pedagogical system whereby students were first required to attend private training sessions before being allowed to join class groups. It is evident that Bartitsu classes included pre-arranged exercises, especially for use in rehearsing those techniques that were too dangerous to be performed at full speed or contact, as well as free-sparring and fencing bouts. According to an anonymous article published in "The Sketch" of April 10, 1901, these sessions may have involved a type of circuit training in which students would rotate between small group classes taught by each of the specialist instructors.

Many Bartitsu self-defence techniques and training sequences were recorded by Barton-Wright himself in his series of articles for Pearson's Magazine. The specific details of other Bartitsu stick fighting training drills were recorded in Captain Laing's article.

== Decline ==
By mid-1902, the Bartitsu Club was no longer active as a martial arts school. The precise reasons for the Club's closure are unknown, but jujutsu instructor William Garrud subsequently suggested that both the enrollment fees and tuition fees had been too high. It is likely that Barton-Wright had simply overestimated the number of wealthy Londoners who shared his interest in exotic self-defence systems.

The last recorded activities of the Bartitsu Club as an entity involved a series of touring exhibitions and contests at venues including Cambridge University, the Oxford Town Hall, the Shorncliffe Army Camp base in Kent, the Mechanics Institute Hall in Nottingham and the Adelphi Theatre in Liverpool between January–April 1902.

Subsequently, most of Barton-Wright's former employees, including jujutsuka Yukio Tani and Sadakazu Uyenishi and Swiss self-defence expert Pierre Vigny, established their own self-defence and combat sports gymnasiums in London. After breaking with Barton-Wright, purportedly due to an argument and a fight, Tani also continued his work as a professional music-hall wrestler under the shrewd management of William Bankier, a strength performer and magazine publisher who went by the stage name of "Apollo". Bankier's promotional efforts helped to spur the international fad for jujutsu that Barton-Wright had begun, and which included the publication of numerous books and magazine articles as well as the establishment of jujutsu schools throughout the Western world. This fad lasted until the beginning of World War I and served to introduce Japanese martial arts into Western popular culture, but Bartitsu per se never again returned to prominence during Barton-Wright's lifetime.

== "Baritsu" and Sherlock Holmes ==
Bartitsu might have been completely forgotten if not for a cryptic reference by Sir Arthur Conan Doyle in one of his Sherlock Holmes mystery stories. In 1903 Conan Doyle had revived Holmes for a further story, "The Adventure of the Empty House", in which Holmes explained his victory over Professor Moriarty in their struggle at Reichenbach Falls by the use of "baritsu, or the Japanese system of wrestling, which has more than once been very useful to me".

The term "baritsu" did not exist outside the pages of the English editions of "The Adventure of the Empty House" and a 1901 Times report titled "Japanese Wrestling at the Tivoli", which covered a Bartitsu demonstration in London but misspelled the name as baritsu. It is likely that Conan Doyle used the 1901 London Times article as source material, copying the "baritsu" misspelling verbatim, particularly in that he had Holmes define "baritsu" as "Japanese wrestling", which was the same phrase used in the newspaper headline.

Given the popularity of the Sherlock Holmes stories, the fact that Holmes credited his survival and victory against Moriarty to "baritsu", and the fact that E. W. Barton-Wright's martial art and, with it, its name's proper spelling had quickly faded from popular memory, the confusion of names persisted through much of the 20th century. In an article for The Baker Street Journal Christmas Annual of 1958, journalist Ralph Judson correctly identified baritsu with Bartitsu, but Judson's article eventually became obscured. During the 1980s, researchers Alan Fromm and Nicolas Soames re-affirmed the relationship between "baritsu" and Bartitsu, and by the 1990s scholars including Yuichi Hirayama, John Hall, Richard Bowen, and James Webb were able to confidently identify and document the martial art of Sherlock Holmes.

== Later life ==
E. W. Barton-Wright spent the remainder of his career working as a physical therapist specialising in innovative (and sometimes controversial) forms of heat, light, and radiation therapy. He continued to use the name "Bartitsu" with reference to his various therapeutic businesses. In 1950, he was interviewed by Gunji Koizumi for an article appearing in the Budokwai newsletter, and later that year he was presented to the audience at a Budokwai gathering in London as "the pioneer of jiujitsu in Great Britain". He died in 1951, at the age of 90, and was buried in what the martial arts historian Richard Bowen described as "a pauper's grave".

== Legacy ==
In many ways, E. W. Barton-Wright was a man ahead of his time. He was among the first Europeans known to have studied the Japanese martial arts and was almost certainly the first to have taught them in Europe, the British Empire or the Americas.

Bartitsu was the first martial art to have deliberately combined Asian and European fighting styles towards addressing the problems of civilian/urban self-defence in an "unarmed society". In this, Barton-Wright anticipated Bruce Lee's Jeet Kune Do approach by over seventy years. A similar philosophy of pragmatic eclecticism was taken up by other early 20th-century European self-defence specialists, including Percy Longhurst, William Garrud and Jean Joseph-Renaud, all of whom had studied with former Bartitsu Club instructors.

In 1906, Renaud introduced a similar concept in France named Défense Dans la Rue in order to fight the increase of street violence at the time. This art was a mixture of boxing, savate and jiu-jitsu inherited from bartitsu, and was broadened by contemporary authors like Émile André and George Dubois, who had been influenced by master-at-arms Joseph Charlemont. In the 1920s, Brazilian physical culture teacher Mario Aleixo published an article for the Eu Sei Tudo magazine about his Defesa Pessoal, which mixed capoeira, jiu-jitsu, boxing, Greco-Roman wrestling and jogo do pau.

Barton-Wright's illustrated article series for Pearson's Magazine popularised self-defence features in newspapers and magazines, which had previously been rare but which became commonplace during the first decade of the 20th century.

E. W. Barton-Wright is also remembered as a pioneering promoter of mixed martial arts or MMA contests, in which experts in different fighting styles compete under common rules. Barton-Wright's champions, including Yukio Tani, Sadakazu Uyenishi and Swiss schwingen wrestler Armand Cherpillod enjoyed considerable success in these contests, which anticipated the MMA phenomenon of the 1990s by a hundred years.

The Bartitsu Club was among the first schools of its type in Europe to offer classes in women's self-defence, a practice taken up after the Club's demise by students of Yukio Tani and Sadakazu Uyenishi including Edith Margaret Garrud and Emily Watts. Mrs. Garrud established her own jujutsu dojo (school) in London and also taught the art to members of the militant Suffragette movement, including the clandestine "Bodyguard" unit of the Women's Social and Political Union, establishing an early association between self-defence training and the political philosophy of feminism.

== Contemporary interest and revival ==
In 2001, the Electronic Journals of Martial Arts and Sciences (EJMAS) web site began to re-publish many of Barton-Wright's magazine articles that had been discovered in the British Library archives by Richard Bowen. Almost immediately, the "Self Defence with a Walking Stick" articles attracted a minor cult following and the illustrations were reproduced, often with humorous captions or other alterations, on a number of other sites. Also in that year, Bartitsu stick fighting demonstrations were added to the educational displays performed at the Royal Armouries in Leeds, U.K.

In 2002, an international association of Bartitsu enthusiasts, known as the Bartitsu Society, was formed to research and then revive E.W. Barton-Wright's "New Art of Self Defence". The Society approaches Bartitsu research and training via two related fields, those of canonical Bartitsu (the self-defence sequences that were detailed by Barton-Wright and his associates 1899–1902) and neo-Bartitsu (modern, individualised interpretations drawing from the canon but reinforced by the training manuals produced by former Bartitsu Club instructors and their students between 1899 and the early 1920s).

The modern revival aims to both preserve what is known of the canonical syllabus and to continue Barton-Wright's experiments in cross-training/testing between (kick)boxing, jiujitsu and stick fighting as they were practiced circa 1901, on the premise that these experiments were left as a work in progress when the original Bartitsu Club closed down. Thus, the revival is considered to be a deliberately anachronistic, collaborative, open-ended and open source project.

Associated interests include the study of the martial arts as Victorian and Edwardian social history. Between 2002-2019 the Bartitsu Society communicated via an email group established by author Will Thomas.

From 2003 onwards, members of the Bartitsu Society began to teach seminar courses in various aspects of the art at stage combat and martial arts conferences throughout the world. Inspired and guided by the Bartitsu Society and the two compendia, Bartitsu training programs have since been launched at the Cumann Bhata Dayton, the Vancouver-based Academie Duello, at the Alte Kampfkunst in Wuppertal, Germany, Briercrest College and Seminary in Caronport, Saskatchewan and at Forteza Fitness and Martial Arts (Ravenswood, Chicago) amongst numerous other locations.

In August 2005, the Society published a book, The Bartitsu Compendium, which was edited by Tony Wolf. The Compendium details the complete history of the art as well as a technical curriculum for canonical Bartitsu. The second volume (August 2008) comprises resources for neo-Bartitsu drawn both from Barton-Wright's own writings and from the self-defence manuals produced by his colleagues and their students, including Yukio Tani, William Garrud, H.G. Lang and Jean Joseph Renaud. Proceeds from the sales of the Bartitsu Compendium, the Bartitsu Compendium II, and the Martial Art of Sherlock Holmes DVD have been dedicated to creating a memorial for E.W. Barton-Wright and to furthering the revival of Bartitsu.

A third volume of the Bartitsu Compendium was published in December 2022, marking the 120th anniversary of the closing of the original Bartitsu Club and the 20th anniversary of the modern revival movement. Subheaded "What Bartitsu Was and What It Can Be", this volume includes an authoritative social history of Bartitsu and anthology of historical articles as well as a technical section highlighting the stylistically unique aspects of Bartitsu as a martial art.

In September 2006, Bartitsu Society member Kirk Lawson released a DVD entitled Bartitsu – the Martial Art of Sherlock Holmes, which is a presentation of Bartitsu techniques as demonstrated at the Spring '06 Cumann Bhata Western Martial Arts Seminar.

In October 2006, the Bartitsu Society launched the Bartitsu.org website, which included information on the history, theory and practice of Barton-Wright's martial art, as well as current events relating to the Bartitsu revival. In 2019 the site suffered a catastrophic technical failure and it was revived in January 2021 as BartitsuSociety.com.

In 2010, a seminar tour was arranged to raise awareness of Bartitsu. Tony Wolf taught consecutive seminars on the West Coast of the US starting in California and moving to Northwest Fencing Academy and then Academia Duellatoria in Oregon. Seminars were then hosted by the School of Acrobatics and New Circus Arts in Seattle, Washington and at Academie Duello in Vancouver, British Columbia.

In August 2009, the Bartitsu Society announced the production of a full-length documentary on E.W. Barton-Wright and his self-defence arts, which was released in March 2011. The first international Bartitsu School of Arms seminar/conference event was held in London, U.K. between August 26–28, 2011 and the second event was held in Chicago, between 7–9 September 2012.

In 2017, Bartitsu came to the attention of a martial arts instructor in Columbus, Georgia. After researching the combat laboratory methods used by the founder and his instructors to add more defence tactics and skills incorporating more ground defence, additional self-defence moves, and basic knife tactics and defences, he took on his first student. He then founded an academy, christened "Neo-Bartitsu Columbus", in 2019 and began offering weekly classes through Bishop's TaeKwonDo Plus.

In the UK, Sensei Tommy Moore runs the Bartitsu Lab. This Bartitsu club aims to bring together the best of the combat sports and self defence focuses of Bartitsu as part of a modern holistic approach.

Articles on various aspects of Bartitsu have been published in journals including Classical Fighting Arts, Western Martial Arts Illustrated, The Journal of Asian Martial Arts, SteamPunk Magazine, Rugged Magazine, Breaking Muscle, The Wall Street Journal, The Atlantic, the Chicago Tribune, The Chap, History Today, de Volkskrant, New City, His Vintage Life, the Epoch Times, Ozy Media and Clarkesworld Magazine. The art has also been showcased on British television in The One Show, Sunday Brunch and in Everybody was Kung Fu Fighting: the Rise of the Martial Arts in Britain, an episode of the Timeshift documentary series on BBC Four.

== 2011 documentary ==
Bartitsu: The Lost Martial Art of Sherlock Holmes (2011) is a feature-length documentary detailing the history, decline and modern revival of Bartitsu, with particular reference to its association with Sherlock Holmes.

Host Tony Wolf travels between locations in Europe including the Swiss Reichenbach Falls and the adjacent town of Meiringen, London, Haltwhistle, Rome and Amantea, explaining the origins and heyday of Bartitsu via narration, animated graphics, re-enactments, archival photographs and interviews. Interviewees include authors Will Thomas and Neal Stephenson as well as martial arts historians Mark Donnelly, Emelyne Godfrey, Harry Cook and Graham Noble.

Major themes include the development of Bartitsu as a confluence of Edwardian interests in Orientalism, physical culture and criminology; the use of jujitsu by the Bodyguards of the radical Suffragette movement in London and subsequent spread of Japanese martial arts through Western popular culture; personality profiles of Barton-Wright himself and the other principal figures of the original Bartitsu craze; and the connection between Bartitsu and Sherlock Holmes' baritsu.

Additional footage shot in Italy and the United States illustrates the modern revival of Bartitsu as a recreational martial art.

== Bartitsu and "baritsu" in popular culture ==
Conan Doyle's "baritsu" developed a life of its own during the latter 20th century, and it was duly recorded that fictional heroes including Doc Savage and The Shadow had been initiated into its mysteries; the latter two characters were established as knowing baritsu in a DC Comics crossover that spilled over into The Shadow Strikes, with both implied to have learned the art personally from Sherlock Holmes. Baritsu has been incorporated into numerous Sherlock Holmes-inspired pastiche novels and short stories and also into the rules of several role-playing games set during the Victorian and Edwardian eras.

The manga and anime series Kuroshitsuji (Black Butler), Dantarian no Shoka (The Mystic Archives of Dantalian) and Kengan Ashura all feature characters who are proficient in baritsu.

Cyrus Barker, the protagonist of novelist Will Thomas' Barker and Llewellyn mystery series, is partly inspired by E.W. Barton-Wright, as is the villainous Sir Callum Fielding-Shaw in Adrienne Kress' young adult novel The Friday Society.

Richard Ryan, the fight choreographer for the 2009 film Sherlock Holmes, has described the "neo-Bartitsu" developed for that project as being a combination of "Chinese Boxing (Wing Chun), swordplay and elements of Brazilian Jujitsu." This "movie Bartitsu" was said to be a modern interpretation of the classic Victorian Bartitsu style. In a 23 December 2009 interview with Vanity Fair magazine, director Guy Ritchie described baritsu as "... a form of Jujitsu. This is way before martial arts took off anywhere in Europe. You can actually look it up on the Internet. You'll see these little men hitting one another with walking sticks. The idea was that you use your opponent's strengths against them. With the use of surprise. There's all sorts of locks and chokes and various other techniques used to incapacitate someone. There's lots of throwing hats at someone's eyes, and then striking at them, if you can, with a walking stick." The film's fight choreography included several signature fighting techniques from Barton-Wright's articles, including double-handed thrusts with walking sticks and the use of an overcoat to distract and entangle an adversary.

The fight choreography for the 2011 sequel, Sherlock Holmes: A Game of Shadows bore an even closer resemblance to historical Bartitsu.

In the DVD commentary for "A Scandal in Belgravia" (episode one of the second season of the BBC TV series Sherlock), writer Mark Gatiss describes a framed glass sign above the title character's bed as showing "the rules of baritsu, the Japanese martial art which got Holmes out of the situation at the Reichenbach Falls in 'The Final Problem'." In fact, the prop sign is a framed Kodokan judo black belt certificate. In the first episode of the third season, Sherlock Holmes alludes to a "system of Japanese wrestling" as the second of thirteen scenarios that might have allowed him to survive his rooftop encounter with Moriarty.

Aiden English and Simon Gotch, known collectively as The Vaudevillains, are professional wrestlers signed to NXT and WWE who incorporate Bartitsu, or "Victorian Era Martial Arts" as some announcers have described, into their wrestling style mainly with stances and selective attacks. They espouse a gimmick of wrestlers from the early 20th century such as Karl Gotch.

The 2015 graphic novel trilogy Suffrajitsu: Mrs. Pankhurst's Amazons offers a fictional alternate history story set in early 1914, in which the secret "Amazons" society of the Women's Social and Political Union are trained in Bartitsu and use the Bartitsu Club as their gymnasium and headquarters. Edward Barton-Wright is depicted as one of their trainers and as an ally in their radical political cause.

In the film Kingsman: The Secret Service, Harry Hart/Galahad (Colin Firth) uses elements of Bartitsu during the pub fight.

In the video game Street Fighter 6, the main villain JP uses a form of Bartitsu.

== Essays by Barton-Wright ==
- Barton-Wright, E. W. (March 1899). "The New Art of Self-defence: How a Man May Defend Himself against Every Form of Attack". Pearson's Magazine. 7: 268–275.
- — (April 1899). "The New Art of Self-defence". Pearson's Magazine. 7: 402–410.
- — (January 1901). "Self-defence with a Walking Stick". Pearson's Magazine. 5 (1): 35–44.
- — (February 1901). "Self-defence with a Walking Stick, Part II". Pearson's Magazine. 11: 130–139.
