= Garrud =

Garrud is a surname. Notable people with the surname include:

- Edith Garrud (1872–1971), British martial artist, suffragist and playwright
- William Garrud (1873–1960), British jujutsu instructor, married to Edith
