= Sadakazu Uyenishi =

Japanese jujitsu practitioner

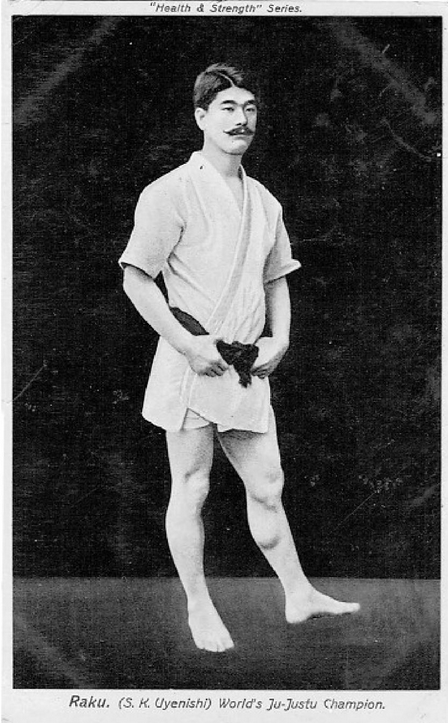
- Born: Sada Kazu Uyenishi; 1880
- Died: Unknown
- Other names: Raku
- Occupation(s): Martial arts instructor Professional Wrestler
- Known for: Founder of School of Japanese Self Defence, London; Text-Book of Ju-Jutsu

Sadakazu Uyenishi (上西 貞一, Uenishi Sadakazu; 1880–? (Note: One biographer placed his death around the start of the Second World War)) also known as S. K. Uyenishi and under the stage name Raku, was a jujitsu practitioner, a professional wrestler and a figure of London Edwardian establishment from 1900 to 1908. He was one of the first Japanese jujitsu practitioners to both teach jujitsu and to compete using the art outside Japan. Uyenishi is credited with introducing jujitsu to the British army and police and with opening the first jujitsu dojo in the UK, known as the School of Japanese Self Defence.

== Early years and martial arts training ==
Sada Kazu Uyenishi was born in 1880, probably at Osaka Prefecture in Honshu, the main island of Japan. His father, Kichibe Uyenishi, had been a famous athlete, noted for his unusual physical strength and skill at kenjutsu, horsemanship, swimming and sumo wrestling. Sadakazu's first martial training was in kenjutsu. As he was contemplating a military career, his father encouraged him to begin training in jujitsu and he enrolled in a local dojo; in an interview, Uyenishi noted that it had been the school of Yataro Handa in Osaka, where Mataemon Tanabe taught. Uyenishi also later referred to having won several jujitsu competitions during his teen years. Uyenishi was also a skilled exponent of rokushakubō and hanbō (combat techniques with a six-foot and three-foot staff, respectively).

== Life and work in Europe ==
In the year 1900, aged twenty, Uyenishi travelled to London at the invitation of Edward William Barton-Wright, the founder of the eclectic martial art of Bartitsu. Soon after his arrival in London, Uyenishi joined fellow expatriate Japanese wrestler Yukio Tani on the teaching faculty of Barton-Wright's Bartitsu Club in Shaftesbury Avenue. Tani and Uyenishi also began to distinguish themselves as professional wrestlers, competing successfully against much larger opponents in the contests promoted by Barton-Wright.

After the Bartitsu Club closed down (circa 1902), Uyenishi continued his work as a professional wrestler and also taught jiujitsu classes at the self defence academy that had been established by his former Bartitsu Club colleague, Pierre Vigny. His abilities as a teacher were often remarked upon, and by 1903 he had established his own dojo, the School of Japanese Self Defence, at 31 Golden Square, Piccadilly Circus. Uyenishi adapted enthusiastically to life in Edwardian London society. He was an exotic "character" whose stylish dress-sense and gentlemanly bearing were considered noteworthy by several interviewers. In 1905, with the assistance of his student E.H. Nelson and writing under his professional wrestling alias of "Raku", Uyenishi produced his Text-Book of Ju-Jutsu, which became a popular reference work. Within, his credentials were listed as: "Instructor to the following Colleges in Japan: Riku-gun yo-nan gako (The Military College for Officers); Tai-iku-kai (The Imperial Military College of Physical Training); Shi-han-gako (The School of Instructors); Jun sa ki-shun-sho (The Police Training School); All Government Schools in Osaka; And to The Army Gymnastic Staff, Headquarters Gymnasium, Aldershot". Three years later, while continuing his wrestling as a sideline, Uyenishi was also employed as a hand-to-hand combat instructor at Aldershot Military School and at Shorncliffe Army Camp. During the period of 1907–8, Uyenishi embarked on a highly successful professional tour of Spain, Portugal and other European countries, teaching jiujitsu classes and performing exhibitions and challenge matches with local wrestlers.

== Return to Japan and death ==
In late 1908 Uyenishi returned to Japan, leaving his Golden Square school in the charge of his senior student, William Garrud. Little is known of his life after that date, but British jujitsu authority Percy Longhurst, in writing an updated biography of Uyenishi for the 9th edition of his Text-Book published just after the Second World War, noted that Uyenishi had died "some years before".

== Legacy ==
Notable individuals who were directly influenced by Sadakazu Uyenishi's teaching included William Garrud whose book The Complete Jujitsuan (published in 1914) became a standard reference work on the subject; Edith Garrud, who went on to establish jujitsu classes for members of the militant Suffragette movement; and Emily Watts, whose 1906 book The Fine Art of Jujitsu was the first English work to record Kodokan judo kata. Some contemporary English judo and jujitsu clubs can trace their teaching lineage back to Sadakazu Uyenishi.
