= Will Thomas (novelist) =

American novelist (born 1958)

Will Thomas, born 1958 in Bucks County, Pennsylvania, is an American novelist who writes a Victorian mystery series featuring Cyrus Barker, a Scottish detective or "private enquiry agent," and his Welsh assistant, Thomas Llewelyn. The Barker/Llewelyn novels are set in the 1880s and often feature historical events, people, and movements. Martial combat is a recurring theme throughout this hardboiled series. In interviews, Thomas has said that Barker is based on men such as Richard Francis Burton and Edward William Barton-Wright, founder of Bartitsu.

Prior to writing novels, Will Thomas wrote essays for Sherlock Holmes society publications and lectured on crime fiction of the Victorian era.

Will Thomas' first novel was nominated for a Barry Award and a Shamus Award, and won the 2005 Oklahoma Book Award. He has been employed as a librarian with the Tulsa City-County Library System, and featured on the cover of Library Journal. The Black Hand was nominated for a 2009 Shamus Award. Fatal Enquiry won the 2015 Oklahoma Book Award. ‘’Heart of the Nile’’ won the 2024 Shamus Award.

Will Thomas is a great fan of Rex Stout, author of the Nero Wolfe mysteries. Thomas studies Victorian martial arts such as Bartitsu and Hung Gar, which he uses in his novels.

== Books ==
=== Barker & Llewelyn Novels ===
- Some Danger Involved (2004)
- To Kingdom Come (2005)
- The Limehouse Text (2006)
- The Hellfire Conspiracy (2007)
- The Black Hand (2008)
- Fatal Enquiry (2014)
- Anatomy of Evil (2015)
- Hell Bay (2016)
- Old Scores (2017)
- "An Awkward Way to Die", short story (2017)
- Blood Is Blood (2018)
- Lethal Pursuit (November 12, 2019)
- Dance with Death (April 13, 2021)
- Fierce Poison (April 12, 2022)
- Heart Of The Nile (2023)
- Death and Glory (2024)
- Season of Death (2025)

=== Sherlock Holmes Short Stories ===
- "The Adventure of Urquhart Manse", in The MX Book of New Sherlock Holmes Stories - Part I (2015)
- "Take Up and Read!", in The MX Book of New Sherlock Holmes Stories - Part XIII (2019)
