= William Garrud =

British martial artist

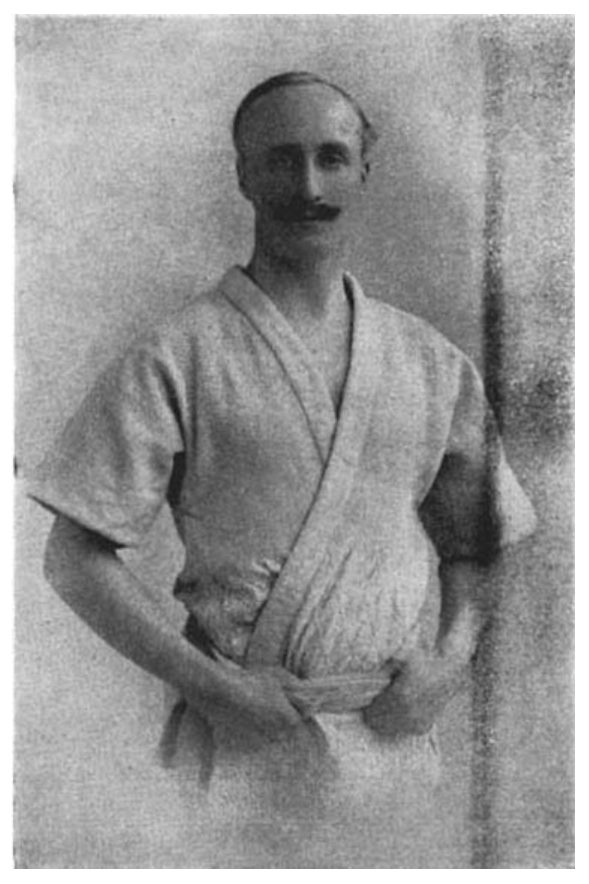
- Garrud in his Jujutsugi
- Born: William H. Garrud; 1873
- Died: 1960 (aged 87)
- Occupations: Martial arts instructor Writer
- Notable work: The Complete Jujitsuan (book)
- Spouse: Edith Garrud

William Garrud (1873–1960) was a British jujutsu instructor. Garrud was introduced to jujutsu in 1899 alongside his wife Edith. They studied under Japanese jujutsu masters Yukio Tani and Sadakazu Uyenishi and later opened their own London dojo. In 1914 Garrud, wrote The Complete Jujitsuan which became a standard work on jujitsu, judo and self-defence and has been republished at least seven times. During the First World War Garrud trained the Volunteer Civil Force in Jujitsu. Edith and William Garrud continued to work as instructors until 1925, when they retired.

== Early life and training ==
William H. Garrud was born in 1873. As a physical culture instructor, specialised in boxing and wrestling, Garrud travelled around the country teaching classes. In 1892 while giving a class in Bath, he met Edith Williams a fellow teacher of physical education. They married the following year, and moved to London where William found work as a physical culture trainer for universities. In 1900 they watched a Jujutsu demonstration at the Alhambra Theatre by Edward William Barton-Wright. The Garruds became students at Barton-Wright's training facility in Soho the Bartitsu School of Arms and Physical Culture, the first known Japanese martial arts' school in Europe. After the school closed in 1902 they continued training under Japanese jujutsu masters Yukio Tani and Sadakazu Uyenishi who opened the School of Japanese Self Defence (Note: also known as the Picadilly School of Ju-jutsu and the Golden Square Dojo, it was the first jujutsu dojo in the U.K) at 31, Golden Square, Piccadilly Circus, London. While training at the Golden Square Dojo Garrud studied with the best instructors of the time including Taro Miyake, Mitsuyo Maeda, (Note: Mitsuyo Maeda is regarded today as the father of Brazilian Jiu-jitsu) Gunji Koizumi (Note: Japanese master of judo Gunji Koizumi came to be known as the father of European judo) and Akitaro Ohno.

When Uyenishi left for Japan in 1908 Garrud took over Uyenishi's dojo. Edith assisted her husband with the women's and children's classes. Edith Garrud was also an active suffragette and led the athletic branch of the Women's Freedom League. (Note: in 1913 she became the trainer for Political Union leader Emmeline Pankhurst’s Bodyguard unit.) They continued performing jujutsu on stage in music hall exhibitions and public demonstrations, where William dressed as a policeman, they also offered private instruction for members of the organisations for women's suffrage. Garrud, published The Complete Jujitsuan in 1914, dedicating it to "Professor S.K. Uyenishi "Raku". His book became a standard work on jujitsu, judo and self-defence and continued as such for decades, it has been republished at least seven times. At the outbreak of the First World War, being too old to serve Garrud joined the Volunteer Civil Force, the armed force of volunteer police officers, training its members for free in jujutsu.

== Retirement and death ==
William and Edith continued to run the Golden Square dojo as owners and instructors until 1925 when they retired from teaching. The Garruds had three children, Owen, John, and Sybil. Eldest son, Owen, was killed in the First World War aged 24. William Garrud died in 1960 at the age of 87.

== Gallery ==
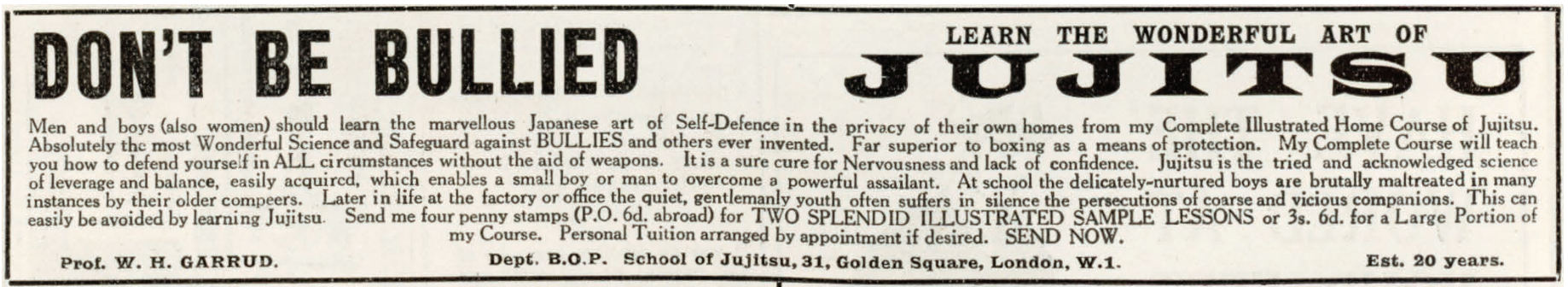
Advert for the Golden Square Dojo placed by William Garrud in The Boy's Own Paper of December 1922.

== Sources ==
- Brough, David (16 November 2020). "The Golden Square Dojo and its Place in British Jujutsu History". Martial Arts Studies. 10 (10): 66. doi:10.18573/mas.113. ISSN 2057-5696. S2CID 228807742.
- Callan, Mike (12 June 2016). "Gunji Koizumi, the father of European judo". Academia.edu.
- Clifford, Bridget (8 February 2018). "West Country superwoman". Royal Armouries.
- Garrud, W.H. (2020). The Complete Jujitsuan. Read Books Limited. ISBN 978-1-5287-6369-1.
- Godfrey, Emelyne (2010). Masculinity, Crime and Self-Defence in Victorian Literature: Duelling with Danger. Crime Files. Palgrave Macmillan UK. ISBN 978-0-230-27345-0.
- Green, Thomas; Svinth, Joseph (2010). Martial Arts of the World: An Encyclopedia of History and Innovation. ABC-CLIO. ISBN 978-1-59884-244-9.
- Kelly, Simon (2019). "Edith Garrud: The jujutsuffragette". In McMurray, Robert; Pullen, Allison (eds.). Power, Politics and Exclusion in Organization and Management. Routledge Focus on Women Writers in Organization Studies. Taylor & Francis. ISBN 978-1-00-006364-6.
- Murray, N.B.J. The Toughest Man Who Ever Lived. Jukken Judo. ISBN 978-0-9648984-2-4.
