= Suffrajitsu: Mrs. Pankhurst's Amazons =

2015 graphic novel trilogy

The cover of Suffrajitsu, Issue #1.

Suffrajitsu: Mrs. Pankhurst's Amazons is a graphic novel trilogy published by Jet City Comics, portraying the adventures of an all-women secret society of bodyguards who protect the leaders of the radical suffragette movement during early 1914.

== Publication history ==
Suffrajitsu was written by Tony Wolf, with art by João Vieira, colors by Josan Gonzales and lettering by Ed Dukeshire. Artwork, colors and lettering were supervised by Jasmine Amiri and Dafna Pleban of BOOM! Studios. Issue #1 was published on January 28, 2015, with Issues #2 and #3 being released on February 25 and March 25.

Initial publication was as a series of e-books via the Amazon Kindle app, with individual issues also becoming available to both US and international readers via comiXology.com. As of May 2015, collected editions became available via both the Kindle Fire and comiXology.

The Suffrajitsu trilogy is part of the Foreworld Saga, a shared-world secret history transmedia franchise initiated by speculative fiction authors Neal Stephenson and Mark Teppo via the Subutai Corporation in 2010.

A printed collector's anthology edition, also including two other Foreworld graphic novels, The Dead God and Symposium, was published as Blood and Honor: The Foreworld Saga Graphic Novels on July 29, 2015.

== Premise and historical basis ==
The majority of characters featured in the Suffrajitsu trilogy are fictionalized versions of real people and many events and locations shown are also closely based on real history.

The trilogy is set during the height of the English women's suffrage protests of the early 20th century, which included acts of mass civil disobedience, sabotage, and even riots as pro- and anti-suffragists battled over the right of women to vote in national elections. During this period, many suffragettes were imprisoned on charges ranging from vandalism and assault to sedition.

In response to the so-called Cat and Mouse Act legislation, which allowed hunger-striking incarcerated suffragettes to be temporarily released from prison and then re-arrested when their health had sufficiently recovered, the Women's Social and Political Union established an all-women bodyguard team. Trained by Edith Margaret Garrud, the team – known within the WSPU as "The Bodyguard" and dubbed "jujitsuffragettes" and "Amazons" by the media – frequently clashed with the police, employing decoy and subterfuge tactics as well as hand-to-hand combat to protect fugitive suffragettes from arrest and assault.

The Suffrajitsu trilogy also refers to numerous circa 1914 events, institutions and social movements notably including eugenics, Bohemianism, composer Alexander Scriabin's Mysterium and the controversial White Feather campaign, which protagonist Persephone Wright rejects on ethical grounds.

== Issues ==
Issue #1 of the trilogy follows Amazon leader Persephone Wright and her team as they engage in escalating conflicts with the police in London and Glasgow during early 1914. Most of the key events depicted in Issue #1 are closely based on real history, including sections of speeches by the politician William Cremer and both Emmeline and Christabel Pankhurst.

In Issues 2 and 3 the plot dramatically diverges from real history, although major elements and characters are inspired by history. In Issue #2 the Amazons embark on a daring rescue mission in the Austrian Alps, battling with members of a eugenic cult called the Order of New Templars and in Issue 3 they must race to prevent a terrorist attack that may have dire consequences for the entire world.

== Characters ==
- Persephone Wright: a "fallen woman", expert strategist and the field leader of the Amazons; partially inspired by real suffragettes including Gertrude Harding and Elizabeth Robins.
- Emmeline Pankhurst: the leader of the radical Women's Social and Political Union, and a fugitive from the law when the story begins.
- Christabel Pankhurst: Emmeline's daughter, and effectively the second-in-command of the WSPU.
- Edward William Barton-Wright: Persephone's uncle; owner of the Bartitsu Club (the Amazons' gymnasium/base of operations) and a staunch supporter of their activism.
- Florence "Flossie" Le Mar: a New Zealand-born adventuress.
- Toupie Lowther: an aristocratic, cross-dressing lesbian motorist, fencer and jujitsu exponent who serves as Mrs. Pankhurst's getaway driver and chauffeuse.
- Judith Lee: an amateur detective and expert lip-reader of Anglo-Chinese descent (adapted from the early 20th century "lady detective" character created by author Richard Marsh).
- Katharina "Sandwina" Brumbach: an Austrian professional wrestler and circus strongwoman.
- Miss Sanderson: a silent femme fatale who is an expert at self-defense with umbrellas and parasols.
- Katherine "Kitty" Marshall: a quick-witted teenager who keeps her suffragette activism secret from her family.
- Vernon Waldegrave Kell: the Director-General of the newly formed British Security Service.
- Edith Margaret Garrud (cameo appearance): the Amazons' jiujitsu instructor and leader of the Palladium Irregulars, a reserve unit of suffragette bodyguards.

== Novellas and short stories ==
During 2014 Suffrajitsu author Tony Wolf organised a scheme that produced two novellas and two short stories inspired by the Suffrajitsu trilogy and licensed and published via the Kindle Worlds platform. The stories included:

The Pale Blue Ribbon, by John Longenbaugh

The Isle of Dogs, by Michael Lussier

Carried Away, by Ray Dean

The Second-Story Girl, by Mark Lingane

With the closure of the Kindle Worlds platform in July 2018, these short stories and novellas are no longer available.

== No Man Shall Protect Us documentary ==
In 2018 Suffrajitsu author Tony Wolf wrote and co-produced/directed the documentary No Man Shall Protect Us: The Hidden History of the Suffragette Bodyguards, detailing the non-fictional, historical activities of the WSPU Bodyguard team. The documentary was made freely available via the Vimeo media platform.
