= Gertrude Harding =

Canadian suffragette

- Born: Gertrude Menzies Harding; 1889; Welsford, New Brunswick, Canada
- Died: 1977 (aged 87–88); New Brunswick, Canada

Gertrude Menzies Harding (1889-1977) was a suffragette born on a farm in rural Canada. She migrated to London, England in 1912. Once there she quickly joined militant suffragette movement, being one of only a handful of Canadian women to do so. Harding was known as one of the highest-ranking and longest-lasting members of the Women's Social and Political Union.

== Early years ==
Harding was born in 1889, the last of seven children on a farm in Welsford, New Brunswick, Canada. Her sketches of the time show her escaping housework to hunt, fish and camp alone in the woods, with a pet raccoon as companion. When Harding was 18 years old, a doctor pronounced that she had a heart murmur, considered a serious condition at the time. She was pleased to be invited to travel to Hawaii as companion to her older sister Nellie Waterhouse and family. Eventually she was asked to teach sewing classes to local women and to care for a boy crippled by polio; her time in Hawaii sparked an interest in working with the poor.

== Suffragette career ==
In 1912 Harding was invited to join the Waterhouse family in London, England, where Dr. Ernest Waterhouse had business interests. Within days, Harding witnessed her first poster parade of women carrying placards with slogans such as "Votes for Women" and "No Taxation without Representation". Drawn to the cause (which had begun 47 years earlier), she was soon a paid Women's Social and Political Union organizer, financially independent. She moved out on her own for the first time.

Harding’s first big ‘job’ was to stage a midnight attack on rare orchids with comrade Lilian Lenton at the Royal Botanical Gardens in Kew (Lilian soon became a daring arsonist for the cause). The women entered the Gardens by day, posing as tourists, and discovered the best places to attack. That night, during a thunderstorm, they broke into two little glass houses with the rarest orchids, intent on wreaking as much damage as possible before being caught. The night watchman didn't come. The next day a dozen newspapers reported ‘the outrage' at Kew Gardens, two claiming it must have been male sympathizers to the cause, as only men could scale the six-foot wall to escape. Harding was later alleged to be an arsonists at the Roehampton croquet pavilion fire, when Olive Hockin and Gertrude Donnithorne were caught with materials for arson in their art studio. Hockin's name was on a newspaper left behind at the scene (two other perpetrators escaped).

Gert Harding started working on the newspaper, The Suffragette, when Headquarters at Lincoln's Inn was raided by Scotland Yard and the paper driven underground. Of greatest note in her career with the WSPU is that Harding was asked to 'head up' the secret bodyguard of women assigned to protect their leader, Mrs Emmeline Pankhurst, from constant rearrest by Scotland Yard during the Cat and Mouse Act. The bodyguard learned jujitsu from Edith Garrud and carried Indian clubs. Despite this, the women were typically heavily outnumbered by the police and frequently suffered injuries including contusions, broken bones, dislocated joints and concussions. Their best successes against bobbies and Scotland Yard detectives came from outwitting them, using disguises, decoys and other forms of subterfuge. On two occasions, a decoy 'Mrs Pankhurst' was arrested, allowing the real Mrs Pankhurst to escape undetected.

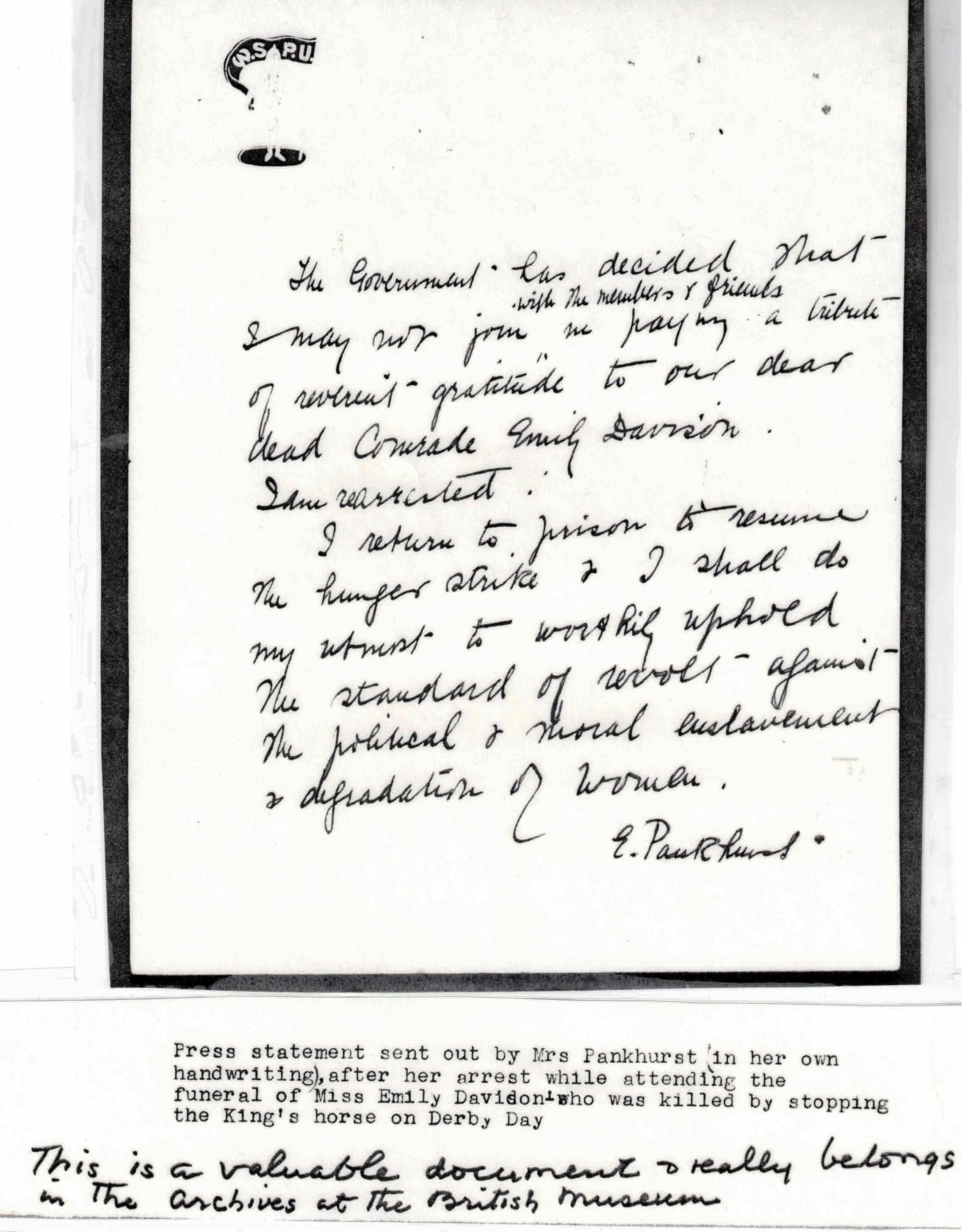
The press release written by Mrs Pankhurst upon her rearrest by Scotland Yard, during funeral for Emily Davison.

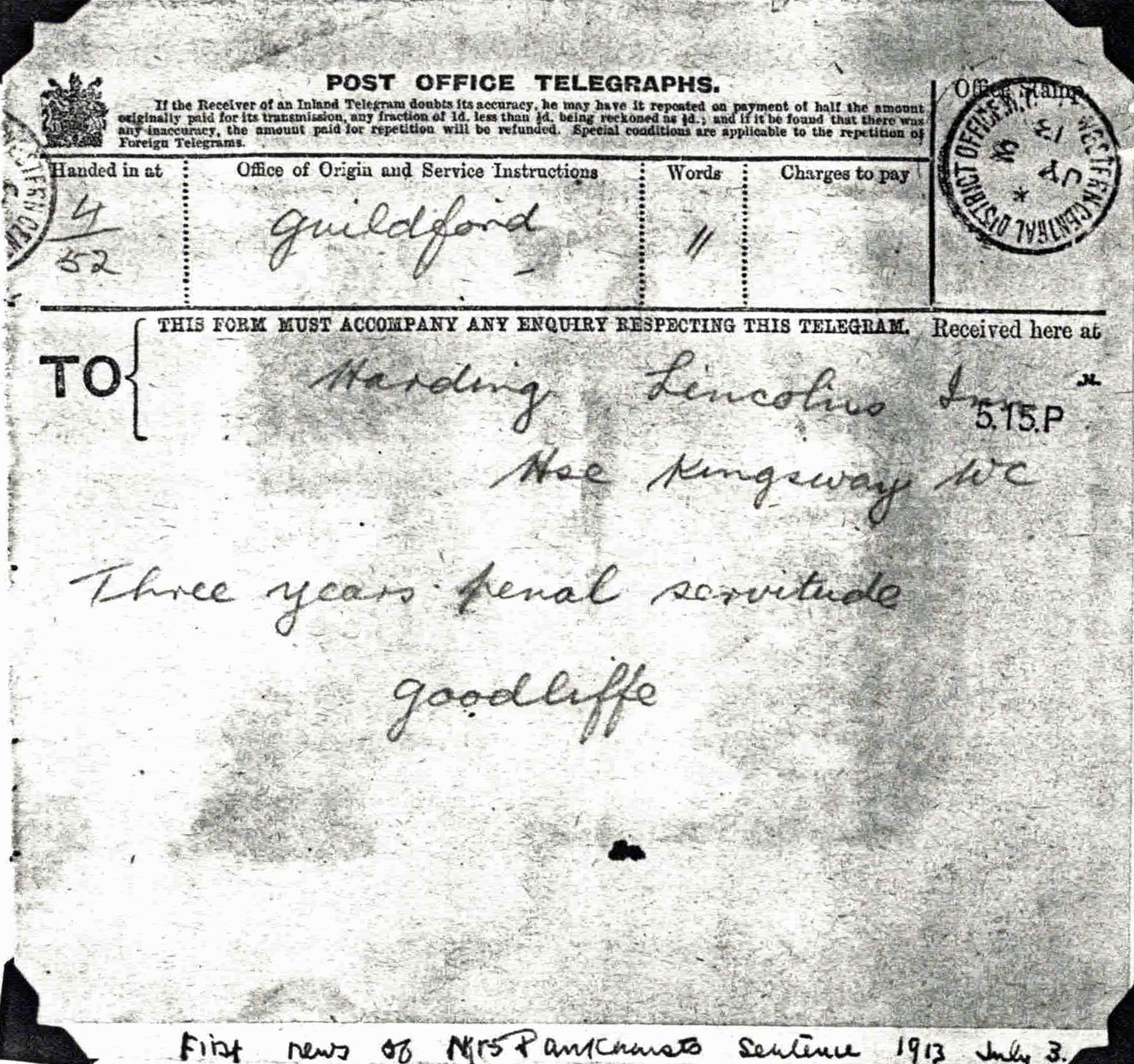
Telegram received by Gert Harding at the WSPU headquarters with news of Mrs Pankhurst's prison sentence, July 3, 1913.

In 1914, Harding became editor of The Suffragette newspaper.

When War broke out, Harding remained as part of the skeletal staff of the WSPU, remaining loyal to the Pankhursts in their allegiance to the British Government during the war effort. Harding was private secretary to Christabel Pankhurst when Christabel was exiled in Paris (1915). The Suffragette newspaper was renamed Britannia, and Harding edited this for five months into 1915. Eventually the Pankhursts had to let her go through lack of funds. Harding landed a job at the Gretna Munitions factory in Scotland, providing social assistance to the women who worked there under terrible conditions.

== Later years ==
Harding moved back to Canada in 1920 to live in a cottage on a field of the William and May Harding farm in Hammond River, New Brunswick. After a year, she landed a job as Welfare Supervisor in Plainfield, New Jersey, which she kept for 13 years.

In her middle years, Harding volunteered with many organizations, fighting for peace, women’s rights, animal rights and the poor. After typing out her memoirs, she pasted them into a scrapbook, added photos and her own sketches and gave it to her niece, Peggy Harding (Kelbaugh), 'to do with as she pleased'. Gert kept in touch with family in New Brunswick and returned there, sick with cancer, to live with niece Audrey Starr in 1976.

Harding died a year later, aged 88. She never married and had no children.

In 1996 Peggy's great-niece, Gretchen Kelbaugh (Wilson) published With All Her Might; the Life of Gertrude Harding, Militant Suffragette, which includes the contents of Gert's scrapbook.

== Portrayals ==
Harding is portrayed in Ann Bertram's play The Good Fight, the story of suffragette Grace Roe performed by Theatre Unbound.

Harding and her sister (Nellie Waterhouse) are also portrayed, with latitude and name changes, in Peter Hilton's fanciful play Mrs Garrud's Dojo. The play, written for and performed by The Lady Cavalier Theatre Company of New York, includes the character of Edith Garrud, who trained the Bodyguard in jujitsu.

Harding partially inspired the fictional character Persephone Wright in the graphic novel trilogy Suffrajitsu: Mrs. Pankhurst's Amazons (2015) and appears under her own name as a supporting character in the spin-off novellas The Second-Story Girl and The Isle of Dogs.

Harding is portrayed by Kat Dennings in an episode of Drunk History entitled "Civil Rights" (2018) and by Scottie Caldwell in the independent documentary No Man Shall Protect Us: The Hidden History of the Suffragette Bodyguards (2018).

== See also ==
- History of feminism
- List of suffragists and suffragettes
- Pankhurst Centre in Manchester
