= Florence LeMar =

Florence "Flossie" LeMar was the stage name of Florence Gardiner (1890–1951), an athlete and entertainer who toured throughout New Zealand and Australia during the early years of the 1910s.

== Biography ==
Little is known of Florence's early life, except that she was born 1890 in Nelson. She spent her formative years in New Zealand and showed special prowess in athletics, becoming both a champion swimmer and skater during her teen years.

By 1913, she had married Joe Gardiner, an expatriate German who worked as a professional wrestler. Joe is believed to have coached Florence in the skills of jujutsu, which he may have learned while in England. The two then developed a theatrical performance in which Florence delivered a lecture on the benefits of jujitsu as a means of self defence and physical culture, especially for women and children, followed by a series of skits in which she demonstrated a variety of jujitsu techniques against Joe, who played the role of the attacker. Described as being "a refined Vaudeville novelty for all the family", the act toured music halls and variety stages throughout Australasia.

In 1913, LeMar wrote a book entitled The Life and Adventures of Miss Florence LeMar, the World's Famous Ju-Jitsu Girl. Essentially similar to their stage act, the book consisted of a polemic essay on the benefits of jujitsu for women, an exposition of self-defence techniques and a series of tall tales about Florence's jujitsu victories against a selection of desperate characters in exotic locations including London and New York City

Florence and Joe divorced in the early 1920s, after he abandoned Flo and their child, little Ronnie, "The World's Youngest Ju-Jitsu Exponent." Florence appears to have continued to work in show-business for a time, and also served as a jujitsu instructor for the New Zealand police force. Much later in life, she sold confectionery in movie theatres.

== Popular culture ==
Florence LeMar was the subject of the popular play The Hooligan and the Lady, which premiered during the 2011 New Zealand Fringe Festival.

She is depicted as a member of a secret society of bodyguards protecting the leaders of the radical suffragettes in the graphic novel trilogy Suffrajitsu: Mrs. Pankhurst's Amazons (2015).
