= Pierre Vigny =

French boxer (1866–1943)

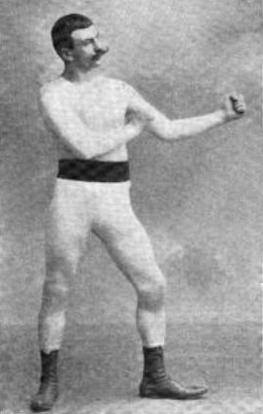
- In The Sketch, 10 April 1901
- Born: 25 March 1866; Taninges, France
- Died: 22 November 1943 (aged 77); Nyon, Switzerland
- Style: Savate

Pierre Vigny (1866–1943) was a French master-at-arms who was active during the late 19th century and early 20th century. He specialised in French savate and in the art of stick fighting known as canne de combat, which he heavily modified to better suit his theories of effective self defense.

== Biography ==
Pierre Vigny was born in Taninges, Haute-Savoie on 25 March 1866.

In 1886, he joined the Second Regiment of French Artillery at Grenoble. Leaving the army in 1898, he founded a school of arms and self defence in Geneva and then moved to London, where he became the chief instructor of the Bartitsu Club operated by Edward William Barton-Wright. Around this time, Vigny also established a tradition of annual exhibitions of combat sports and self defence skills.

In 1903, Vigny opened his own self-defence academy in London, based at #18 Berner Street. During this period, he also married a young woman named Miss Sanderson, who became his assistant instructor. He continued to work as a hand-to-hand combat instructor, including an engagement training recruits at Aldershot Military School. A few years later, his wife Marguerite developed a self-defense technique with an umbrella.

In 1912, Vigny returned to Geneva and established another self-defence school there.

== The Vigny method of stick fighting ==
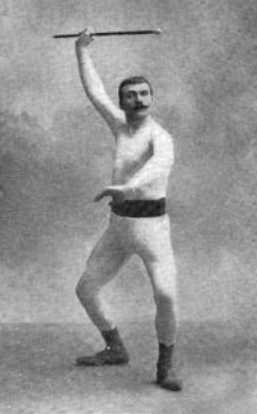

Vigny is best-remembered today as the founder of a unique style of stick fighting, which employed walking sticks and umbrellas as weapons of self-defence. Aspects of his method were recorded by E.W. Barton-Wright in a series of articles entitled Self Defence with a Walking Stick, published in Pearson's Magazine in 1901.

In 1923, Superintendent H.G. Lang, an officer of the Indian Police, wrote a book entitled The Walking Stick Method of Self Defence which drew largely from the Vigny system via Lang's training with Vigny's student Percy Rolt. During the 1940s, Lang's book became the basis for self-defence training of tens of thousands of Jews living in Palestine.

== Bibliography ==
Lang, H.G. The Walking Method of Self-Defence by an Officer of the Indian Police London: Athletic Publications, LTD 1923
