= Volunteer Civil Force =

The Volunteer Civil Force (VCF) was an armed force of volunteer police officers, established in February 1913 by picture dealer, restorer and framer William Mailes Power. at Ruskin House, Rochester Row, Westminster, which became its headquarters.

Power had previously been one of the founders of the Volunteer Police Force, begun on 21 October 1911 with Power as its vice-president and the Duke of Abercorn as its president - it was renamed the Civilian Force in December 1911. Power was removed from the Civilian Force on 16 December 1912 and the following year forced to apologise for inadvertently misrepresenting the VCF as the Civilian Force's successor and the Civilian Force as defunct. Though still in existence at the time of the court case, it is unclear when the Civilian Force disbanded.

The VCF was popularly known as Winston's Bobbies due to Winston Churchill's encouragement of its formation to assist the Metropolitan Police in a context of national strikes by rail, dock and coal workers in 1911 and 1912. Part of the VCF was embodied as a labour battalion of the London Regiment on the outbreak of World War One and the rest later joined the Artists Rifles. By July 1915 the VCF was known as the Westminster Battalion, West London Regiment, Volunteer Training Corps, with Power granted army rank as a Temporary Captain, but it was not re-formed as a separate body after the end of the conflict.
