= Edith Garrud =

British martial artist and suffragist (1872–1971)

Edith Margaret Garrud
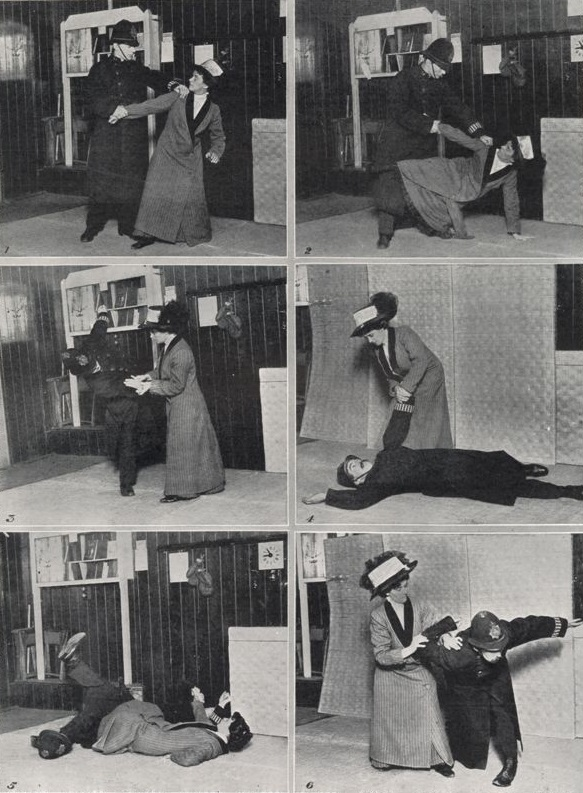
- Garrud demonstrating jujitsu on her husband dressed as a police officer in The Sketch
- Born: Edith Margaret Williams; 1872; Bath, Somerset, England
- Died: 1971 (aged 98–99)
- Occupations: Martial arts instructor playwright
- Spouse: William Garrud (m. 1893; died 1960)

Edith Margaret Garrud (née Williams; 1872–1971) was a British martial artist, suffragist and playwright. She was the first British female teacher of jujutsu and one of the first female martial arts instructors in the western world.

Garrud was introduced to jujutsu in 1899 alongside her husband William; they studied under Sadakazu Uyenishi and she later opened her own London dojo. A supporter of women's suffrage, Garrud joined the Women's Freedom League in 1906 where she set up a self-defence club. To advertise how women could benefit from jujitsu, Garrud wrote fictional self-defence scenarios for magazines that she sometimes staged as suffrage theatre performance with costumes and props.

Garrud is best remembered for training the Bodyguard unit of the Women's Social and Political Union in jujutsu self-defence techniques to protect their leaders from arrest and from violence by members of the public. Garrud is credited with forging the image of the militant suffrage campaigner trained in hand-to-hand combat that came to represent the militants' struggle for the vote.

== Life ==
Edith Margaret Williams was born in 1872 in Bath, Somerset. After being raised in Wales she pursued her education in England where she trained as a physical culture instructor for girls. In 1892, she met William Garrud, a fellow instructor, specialised in boxing and wrestling, at a class he was giving. They married the following year, and moved to London, where William worked as a physical culture trainer for universities.

In 1899, the Garruds were introduced to the art of jujutsu by witnessing a demonstration by Edward William Barton-Wright, an Englishman who had studied Shinden Fudo Ryu jujutsu and Kodokan judo while living in Kobe, Japan between 1893 and 1897. Barton-Wright promoted jujitsu and other martial arts via music hall exhibitions and tournaments. He was also the founder of Bartitsu, a "New Art of Self Defence", and the owner of The Bartitsu School of Arms and Physical Culture. Barton-Wright's school, where he offered self-defence classes for men and women, was the first known Japanese martial arts' school in Europe. The Garruds trained under the school's jujutsu instructors Yukio Tani and Sadakazu Uyenishi, two experienced martial artists whom Barton-Wright had brought from Japan. After the Bartitsu school closed in 1902, the Garruds continued training under Uyenishi at his own Golden Square Dojo The School of Japanese Self-Defence. At the end of 1908 Uyenishi decided to return to Japan, and the Garruds took over the dojo from him, becoming instructors. Edith Garrud continued giving lessons to women and children while William taught the men. A year later Edith opened her own dojo, The School of Ju-jutsu, at Argyll Place. Edith became the first British female teacher of jujutsu, and one of the first female martial arts instructors in the Western world.

As a supporter of women's suffrage, Garrud joined the Women's Freedom League (WFL) in 1906. To advertise the benefits of jujutsu specifically for women's personal protection, the Garruds took to the stage in music hall exhibitions and public demonstrations. During some of their performances, William dressed as a police officer while Edith played a suffragette campaigner that he tried unsuccessfully to arrest. As her renown grew, Edith was featured in 1907 as the protagonist in a short film entitled The Lady Athlete; or, Jiu-Jitsu Downs the Footpads, which was produced by the Gaumont British Picture Corporation and directed by Alf Collins. In 1908 she was appointed head of the Women's Athletic Society, the WFL athletics branch.

In May 1909 the militant Women's Social and Political Union's (WSPU) organised a "Woman's Exhibition" at the Prince's Skating Rink in Knightsbridge where Edith was invited to perform a jujutsu exhibition. After explaining jujutsu principles and techniques, she invited audience members to test her skill. The volunteers famously included a sceptical male police officer who ended up subjected to a shoulder throw. WSPU activists, known as "suffragettes", frequently faced violence during their campaigning work and Garrud, as a renowned martial arts performer and instructor, was approached by WSPU leader Emmeline Pankhurst and asked to train their members. In response Garrud instituted a twice-weekly Suffragettes' Self-Defence Club at her dojo, exclusively for WSPU members and advertised in the organisation's official newspaper Votes for Women. In late 1909 an article in Health and Strength, a physical-culture journal, used the mocking inflammatory title "Ju-jutsuffragettes: New Terror of the Police" in a report about Garrud's Self-Defence classes. Garrud was keen for her training not be seen as an encouragement to attack police officers, but rather as a means for women to defend themselves against assaults. In an article written in response entitled "The ju-jutsu suffragettes: Mrs Garrud replies to her critics", published in Health & Strength, she emphasised that "policemen, on the whole, are the greatest friends and admirers the woman suffragette has" and asked to look after them and "resent any impertinence offered to them". That same year, in an essay for Votes for Women, Garrud outlined her vision for female empowerment gained through martial arts:

It is the Japanese fine art of jujutsu or self-defence that has proved more than a match for mere brute force, and is, therefore, not only a good accomplishment, but a necessary safeguard for the woman who has to defend herself through life . . . . physical force seems the only thing in which women have not demonstrated their equality to men, and whilst we are waiting for the evolution which is slowly taking place and bringing about that equality, we might just as well take time by the forelock and use science, otherwise ju-jitsu.

— Edith Garrud, The World we live in: Self-defence, Votes for Women, March 1910

On 23 July 1910 Health and Strength published Damsel v. Desperado, a self-defence scenario written by Garrud. The fictional story featured a diminutive lady in a deserted street who sees off an attack by two male assailants with blocks, holds and throws. As her fame grew she was represented in a satirical cartoon by Arthur Wallis Mills published in Punch, a drawing entitled The Suffragette that Knew Jiu-Jitsu. The Arrest portrayed a tiny lady flexing her muscles while surrounded by a crowd of terrified police officers. Edith's play Damsel v. Desperado was reprinted alongside the cartoon at the request of Punch's editor. On 6 July 1910, the illustrated The Sketch published an article entitled "If you want to earn some time throw a policeman!". It featured Edith, in a traditional Edwardian dress and hat, using jujutsu on a police officer, played by her husband William, similar to the routine they did on stage.

In 1911, Health & Strength announced a new Suffrage drama choreographed by Garrud and rehearsed at her dojo. The play entitled Ju-Jutsu as a Husband-Tamer: A Suffragette Play with a Moral featured a costermonger's wife taming her drunken husband into subjection after he attacked her, using her jujutsu skills and mastery of self-defence. The article was illustrated with photographs of Garrud performing the techniques from the play. For historian Wendy Rouse "The idea that such training could empower women to defend themselves against domestic violence, the most personal and most common form of violence and oppression of women, represented women's hope in dismantling the patriarchal power structure". In January 1911, Garrud choreographed the fight scenes for a polemic play entitled What Every Woman Ought to Know. During the celebration of the coronation of King George V on 22 June 1911, Edith led the procession of the athletics division of the WFL through London. From 1911, in response to increased demand, Garrud moved her Suffragettes' Self-Defence Club to the Palladium Academy, a dance school in Argyll Street.

== Training the WSPU's Bodyguard ==
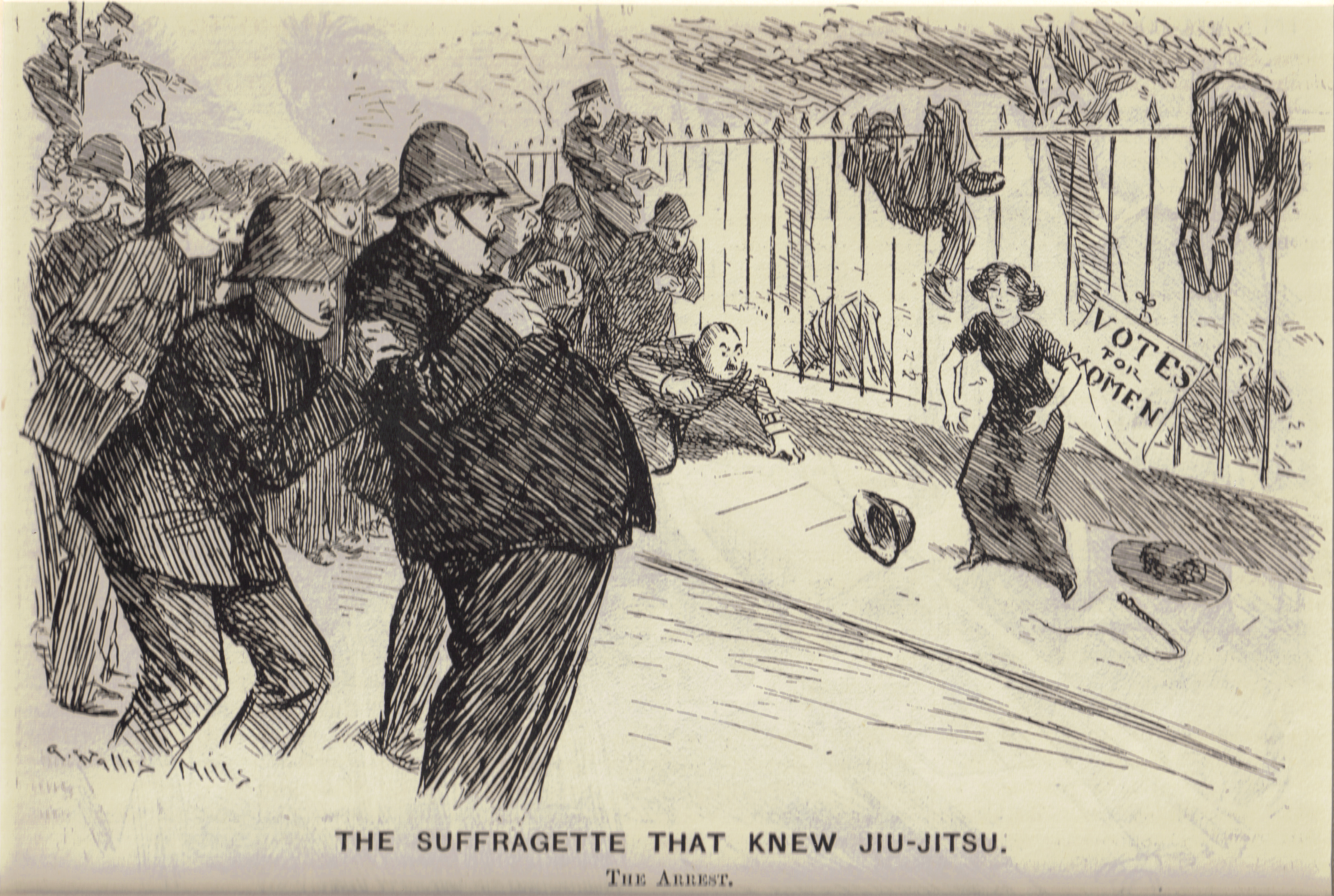
The Suffragette that Knew Jiu-Jitsu. The Arrest. By Arthur Wallis Mills, originally published in 1910 in Punch and The Wanganui Chronicle.

In 1913, the Asquith-led government instituted the so-called Cat and Mouse Act whereby suffragette leaders on hunger strikes could legally be released from jail to recover at home before being re-arrested to complete their sentences. The WSPU responded by establishing a thirty-member, all-woman protection unit known within the WSPU as "the Bodyguard". Its role was to protect WSPU leader Pankhurst from re-arrest under the Cat and Mouse Act. The WPSU leaders started advising all women in the movement to train in self-defence. Newspaper reports called them the "Jiujitsuffragettes", and the "Amazons". Garrud became the trainer of the Bodyguard, teaching them jujutsu and the use of Indian clubs as defensive weapons. Their lessons took place in a succession of secret locations to avoid the attention of the police.

The Bodyguard fought a number of well-publicised hand-to-hand combats with police officers who were attempting to arrest Pankhurst, most famously during the so-called "Battle of Glasgow" on 9 March 1914 and during the WSPU "Raid on Buckingham Palace" on 24 May 1914.

On several occasions they were also able to stage successful escapes and rescues, making use of tactics such as disguise and the use of decoys to confuse the police. A number of these incidents are described in the unpublished memoir of Bodyguard member Katherine "Kitty" Marshall, titled Suffragette Escapes and Adventures. Journalists coined the term "suffrajitsu" – a portmanteau of "suffragette" and "jujitsu" (Note: Jujitsu is an alternative spelling of jujutsu; both are considered correct renditions of the Japanese characters.) – to describe their techniques of self-defence, sabotage and subterfuge.

The Bodyguard was disbanded shortly after the onset of the First World War, as Pankhurst had decided to suspend militant suffrage actions and to support the British government in the war effort. When the conflict ended in 1918, women over thirty were given the vote, effectively ending the suffragist movement in Britain. Universal suffrage came a decade later.

== Later life and legacy ==
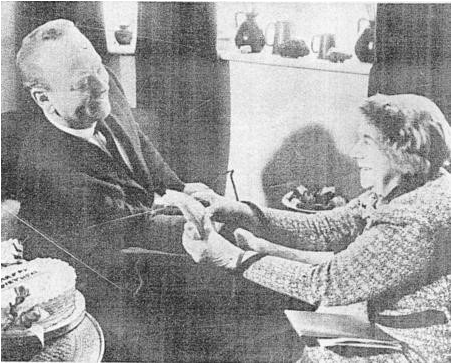
Edith Garrud demonstrates a jujitsu wrist-lock on journalist Godfrey Winn on the occasion of her 94th birthday on 19 June 1965.

Edith and William Garrud continued to work as self-defence and jujutsu instructors until 1925, when they sold their school. They had at least two children, a son and a daughter. William Garrud died in 1960 at the age of 87. On 19 June 1965, on the occasion of her 94th birthday, Garrud was the subject of a feature article published in Woman magazine called "Dear Mrs. Garrud – I wish I’d Known You Then ...", during the interview she demonstrated on English journalist Godfrey Winn some of her arm locking techniques. She died in 1971 at the age of 99.

In a 2018 journal article, Mike Callan, Conor Heffernan and Amanda Spenn argued that although Garrud and the WSPU's employment of jujutsu was short-lived, her classes did "introduce women to new ideas about the possibilities for their gender and undermine assumed notions of their vulnerability" and contributed to the art becoming a part of the culture of the time, with a lasting significance demonstrated by supporters of Christabel Pankhurst's 1918 general election campaign in Smethwick using jujutsu against opponents.

Academic Simon Kelly wrote in a 2019 book chapter that "we know very little of [Garrud's] early years or later life", and that the limited sources available, such as magazine and newspaper articles, about Garrud and the Bodyguard has "created mystery ... which in recent years has taken on an almost folkloric quality as tales of a secret group of female martial arts fighters have circulated around news and social media".

Theatre and performance scholar Diana Looser wrote in 2011 that:

Edith Garrud's importance lies in her appreciation and deployment of the broader political potential encoded in jujutsu skills. In adopting jujutsu as a radical physical and political performance that disrupted simultaneously gender expectations and the masculine ideal upon which the discourse of British nationalism was based, Garrud helped modify women's cultural identities while resignifying the Japanese martial arts in terms of social purpose and gender, class and national identity. In this era of sought-after personal and political autonomy, Garrud's use of the martial arts reflected, and helped contribute to, social change.

== Portrayals in popular culture and commemorations ==
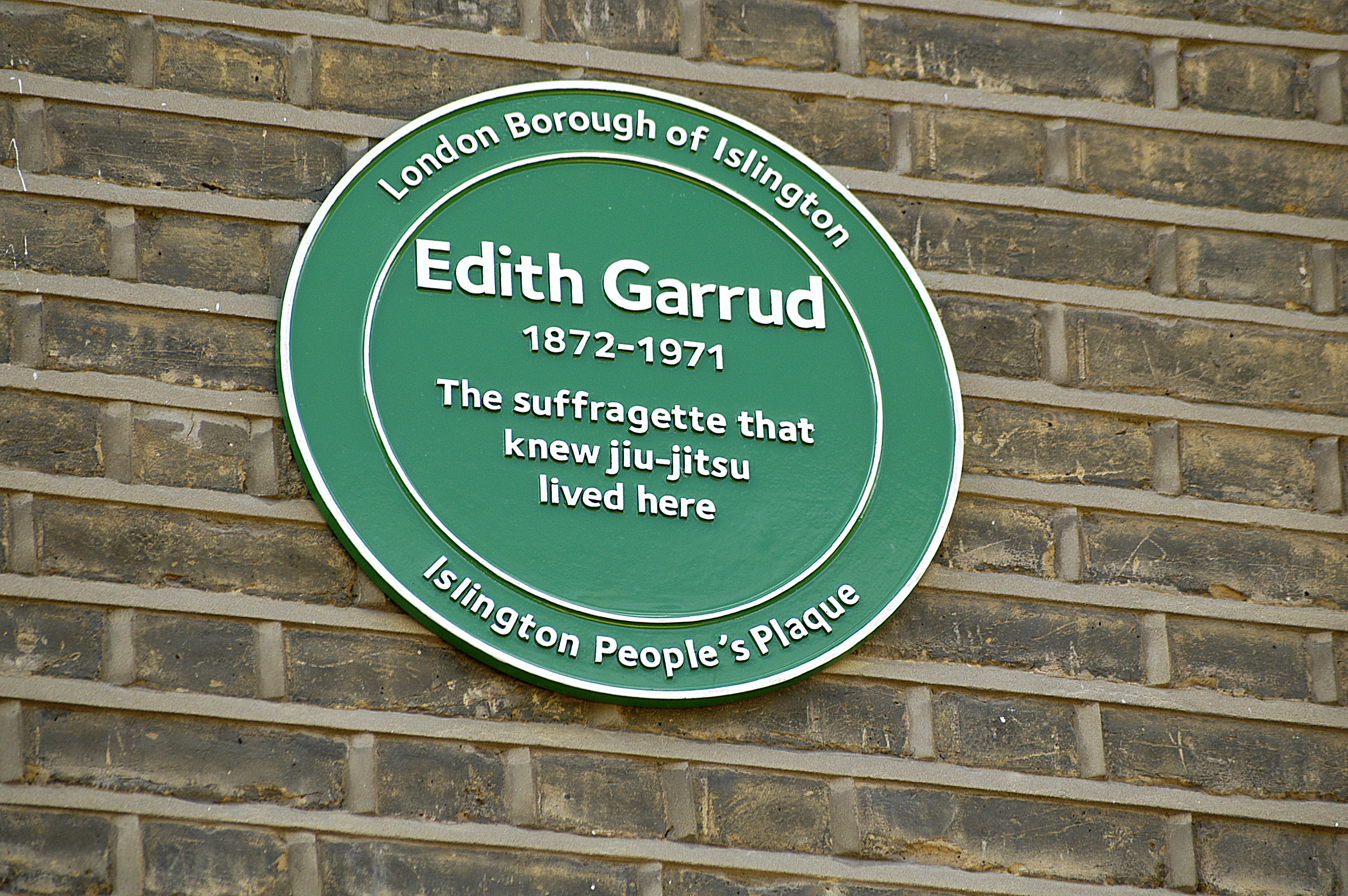
Commemorative plaque in Thornhill Square, outside Garrud's former home

- The Year of the Bodyguard (1982), a docudrama for Britain's Channel 4 directed by Noel Burch featured a group of suffragettes escaping from the police after a window-smashing protest and taking refuge inside Edith Garrud's jujitsu school.
- The Perfect Daughter (2002), a novel by Gillian Linscott, features a martial arts-oriented subplot with Edith Garrud as a supporting character.
- Mrs Garrud's Dojo (2003), a play by Peter Hilton about Garrud's involvement with the suffragettes.
- The One Show (2014): a short documentary about Garrud and presented by Honor Blackman was featured on the BBC One program.
- Suffrajitsu: Mrs. Pankhurst's Amazons (2015), a graphic novel trilogy in which Garrud makes a cameo appearance.
- Suffragette (2015), a film directed by Sarah Gavron with Helena Bonham Carter. Bonham Carter modeled her performance after Garrud, even asking the filmmakers to change her character's name from Caroline to Edith. The film includes a scene in which her character teaches self-defence to a group of suffragettes. Bonham Carter said that Garrud, who could defend herself against men twice her weight and size, was a real inspiration for her character.
- No Man Shall Protect Us: The Hidden History of the Suffragette Bodyguards (2019), a documentary in which actress Lynne Baker portrays Edith Garrud during several reenactment sequences.
- Enola Holmes (2020), a film directed by Harry Bradbeer where the titular character is taught jujutsu by an instructor named Edith, played by Susie Wokoma.

On 30 June 2011, an Islington People's Plaque was placed outside Garrud's former home in Thornhill Square by the Islington London Borough Council, the words on the plaque read: "Edith Garrud 1872–1971. The suffragette that knew jiu-jitsu lived here". In 2013, Garrud was included in a sculpture in Finsbury Park bus and tube station.

== Sources ==
=== Books ===
- Crawford, Elizabeth (2003). The Women's Suffrage Movement: A Reference Guide 1866–1928. Women's and Gender History. Taylor & Francis. ISBN 978-1-135-43402-1.
- Brousse, Michel (2001). Christensen, Karen; Guttman, Allen; Pfister, Gertrud (eds.). International Encyclopedia of Women and Sports. Macmillan Reference USA. ISBN 978-0-02-864954-2.
- Gagne, Tammy (2020). Trends in Martial Arts. Dance and Fitness Trends. eBooks2go Incorporated. ISBN 978-1-5457-5146-6.
- Godfrey, Emelyne (2010). Masculinity, Crime and Self-Defence in Victorian Literature: Duelling with Danger. Crime Files. Palgrave Macmillan UK. ISBN 978-0-230-27345-0.
- Godfrey, Emelyne (2012). Femininity, Crime and Self-Defence in Victorian Literature and Society: From Dagger-Fans to Suffragettes. Crime Files. Palgrave Macmillan. ISBN 978-0-230-30031-6.
- Gracie, Renzo; Danaher, John (2003). Mastering Jujitsu. Mastering Martial Arts. Human Kinetics. ISBN 978-1-4925-8266-3.
- Green, Thomas; Svinth, Joseph (2010). Martial Arts of the World: An Encyclopedia of History and Innovation. ABC-CLIO.
- Kelly, Simon (2019). "Edith Garrud: The jujutsuffragette". In McMurray, Robert; Pullen, Allison (eds.). Power, Politics and Exclusion in Organization and Management. Routledge Focus on Women Writers in Organization Studies. Taylor & Francis. ISBN 978-1-000-06364-6.
- Purvis, June (2002). Emmeline Pankhurst: A Biography. Women's and gender history. Routledge. ISBN 978-0-415-23978-3.
- Raeburn, Antonia (1974). Militant Suffragettes. New English Library.
- Robertson, A. (2018). Screening Protest: Visual narratives of dissent across time, space and genre. Taylor & Francis. ISBN 978-1-351-70218-8.
- Rouse, Wendy L. (2017). Her Own Hero: The Origins of the Women's Self-Defense Movement. NYU Press. ISBN 978-1-4798-2853-1.

=== Websites ===
- Brown, Hannah (11 July 2021). "The Battle of Glasgow: Scotland's 'hidden' history of suffragettes and self-defence from 'Suffrajitsu' to Indian clubs". The Scotsman.
- Sollosi, Mary (23 September 2020). "Helena Bonham Carter talks putting a twist on a classic with 'Enola Holmes'". Entertainment Weekly.
- "Soul II Soul frontman lands London sculpture honour". Daily Express. 26 April 2013.
- "Recent Plaques – Islington Council". islington.gov.uk. 22 March 2015. Archived from the original on 22 March 2015.
- Kurchak, Sarah (10 July 2015). "Edith Garrud and the Jiu Jitsu of the Suffragette Movement". VICE.
- "Signature Stories at the Greenwich Street Theatre". New York Theater Guide. 10 November 2005.
- Ruz, Camila; Parkinson, Justin (5 October 2015). "'Suffrajitsu': How the suffragettes fought back using martial arts". BBC News.
- Case, Roy (8 March 2021). "Bartitsu: The Art of Self-defence Part 2". Playing Pasts.
- "Start of the suffragette movement". UK Parliament.
- "Women get the vote". UK Parliament.
- Truffaut-Wong, Olivia (22 October 2015). "Is Edith In 'Suffragette' Based on a Real Person? The Movie Took Inspiration From Actual Fighters For Women's Rights". Bustle.
- Clifford, Bridget (8 February 2018). "West Country superwoman". Royal Armouries. Archived from the original on 1 October 2021.
- "No Man Shall Protect Us: The Hidden History of the Suffragette Bodyguards". 20 June 2018 – via Vimeo.

=== Journals ===
- Callan, Mike; Heffernan, Conor; Spenn, Amanda (2018). "Women's Jūjutsu and Judo in the Early Twentieth-Century: The Cases of Phoebe Roberts, Edith Garrud, and Sarah Mayer" (PDF). The International Journal of the History of Sport. 35 (6). Routledge, Taylor & Francis Group: 530–553. doi:10.1080/09523367.2018.1544553. hdl:2299/21915. S2CID 150727363 – via University of Hertfordshire Research Archive.
- Leonard, Zeb; Waldron, David (2021). "Ju-Jitsu's Role in the Fight for Women's Suffrage". Agora: Journal of the History Teachers Association of Victoria. 56 (1): 3–8.
- Looser, Diana (2010). "Radical Bodies and Dangerous Ladies: Martial Arts and Women's Performance, 1900–1918 – Theatre Research International". Theatre Research International. 36 (1): 3–19. doi:10.1017/S0307883310000684. ISSN 1474-0672. S2CID 154300075.
