= Emily Diana Watts =

Jujitsu instructor (1867–1968)

Watts (left), in 1906

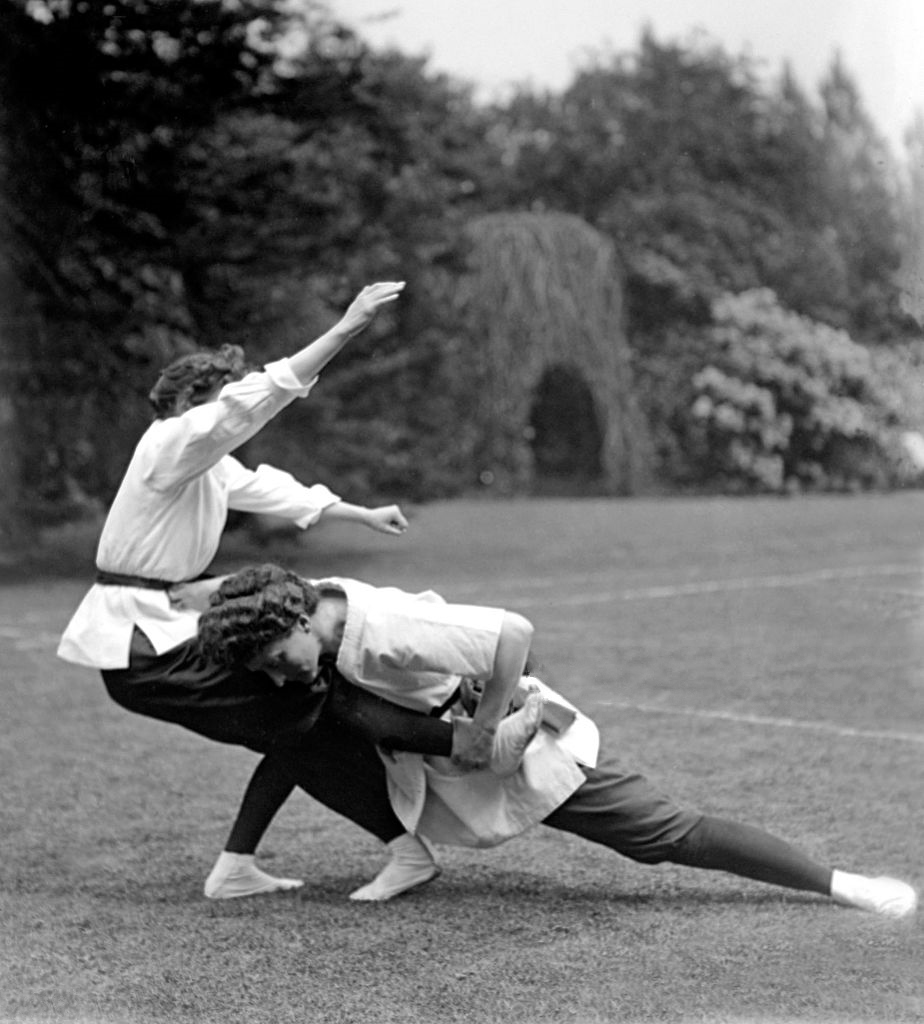
Watts (left) teaches jujutsu to Mary Russell, Duchess of Bedford c. 1905

Emily Diana Watts or Diana Watts or Mrs Roger Watts (1867–1968) was among the first female instructors of the Japanese art of jujitsu in the Western world. She was also an innovator in the field of physical culture.

== Life ==
Born into a wealthy family in England during the latter Victorian era, she studied dance from a young age. By 1903 Watts had developed a strong interest in jujitsu and joined the Golden Square dojo of Sadakazu Uyenishi and Akitaro Ono. By 1906 she was teaching her own classes to 15 boys at the Prince's Skating Club in Knightsbridge. She also published a book, "The Fine Art of Jujitsu", which is notable for having been the first book in the English language to detail Kodokan judo kata. The book included an introduction by Mary Russell, Duchess of Bedford.

Extract from her 1906 book

In 1914 Watts produced another book, "The Renaissance of the Greek Ideal", presenting an original system of calisthenic exercises inspired by ancient Greek statuary and artwork. She wrote this book as "Diana Watts". On the strength of this work, she was inducted into the French Institut Marey and the Archaeological Institute of America.

Watts spent much of the subsequent four decades touring the international lecture circuit, performing demonstrations of her system. By the 1940s she had circled the globe five times, meeting Mahatma Gandhi and befriending George Bernard Shaw and other notables.

Watts died in 1968 at the age of 101.

== Works ==
- The Fine Art of Jujitsu (1906) (writing as Mrs. Roger Watts)
- The Renaissance of the Greek Ideal (1914)
