= Canne de combat =

French martial art involving canes

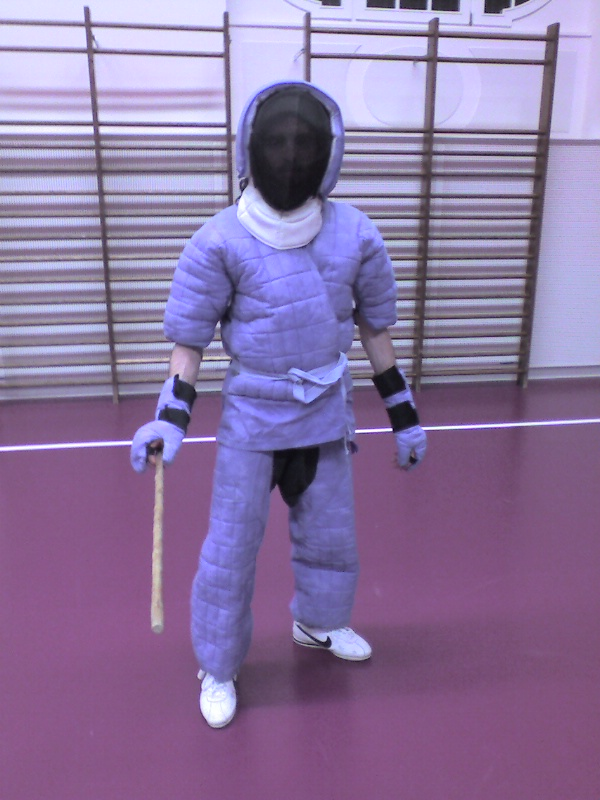
- Also known as: La canne, Canne d'arme
- Focus: Weaponry
- Country of origin: France
- Creator: Various
- Famous practitioners: Pierre Vigny
- Parenthood: Fencing quarterstaff related
- Olympic sport: Demonstration sport at 1924 Summer Olympics

Canne de combat is a French combat sport. As weapon, it uses a canne or cane (a kind of walking-stick) designed for fighting. Canne de combat was standardized in the 1970s for sporting competition by Maurice Sarry. The canne is very light, made of chestnut wood and slightly tapered. A padded suit and a fencing mask are worn for protection.

== History ==
The canne de combat or canne d'arme originated in France in the early 19th century as a self-defence discipline and was particularly used by the upper classes in large, unsafe cities such as Paris. Some classify it as a French martial art although its codification as a sport does not allow this name officially. The history of the discipline is closely linked to the development of the savate boxing techniques, which in earlier forms largely used kicks and later, under the influence of the British, incorporated punches. Gentlemen trained into the savate techniques mastered cane as a way of fighting from a distance as well as close combat kickboxing. The cane was more common in cities, whereas a staff akin to a European quarterstaff was more popular in rural areas. The tactics used were largely interchangeable between these disciplines.

The techniques of savate and canne d'arme increased in popularity up to the point that they were used by military and police forces until World War I. The deaths of many of its practitioners during the war caused the discipline to decline substantially. Its techniques continued, however, to be taught in a few savate boxing clubs that remained after the First World War and managed to survive World War II. There is reputed to be a group who operated during the Nazi occupation who used cane techniques to carry out assassinations. Cane fighting techniques of the late 1950s and 1960s were influenced by revival efforts of enthusiasts.

=== Self-defence sport ===
During the late 1970s, the techniques of the canne d'arme were codified by Maurice Sarry with a view to rehabilitating it as a sport. This led to the discipline which is still today associated with the Federation de Savate Boxe Française ("French Savate Boxing Federation"). Aside from the sport approach, self-defense techniques are still alive; e.g., the "Master Lafond" technique.

Today, the sport canne de combat is practiced by a thousand cannistes, and the French staff by some hundreds of bâtonniers or bâtonnistes.

== Canne de combat in the USA ==
In the USA Jean-Noel Eynard brought canne de combat to the east coast in combination with Savate. The first real FFBFSDA/ FIS club of Canne de combat/ Savate was open in 1983 on the east coast in Philadelphia, under Dr. Jean-Noel Eynard, FFBFSDA/ FIS Professeur with the assistance of former FFBFSDA/ FIS DTN Bob Alix. Canne de combat was also taught in 1994 in Memphis, Tennessee.

== Use ==
The use of the cane as a weapon, as originally taught in weapons schools, was codified by the masters of savate so that the cane was taught as a weapon of self-defence. The French tradition includes techniques of medieval stick-fighting (bâton français), excepting those techniques considered too dangerous to be used in sport. The medieval stick is too heavy a weapon to be used in competition.

Its use has thus been lost and today canne de combat itself is disappearing. There is, however, a martial tradition passed down to Swiss master Pierre Vigny, which was used for codification of techniques using the Indian cane at the beginning of the 20th century, forming a separate tradition from the more common sporting cane seen in France today. The cane, first used for support and then as a gentleman's accessory, also provided a useful weapon. A normal walking stick is usually within the boundaries of legal self-defence, but the loaded cane (weighted with lead at one end) may be considered a weapon in some jurisdictions.

== Rules ==
In the modern sporting canne de combat system found in France, bouts are held inside a ring. The cane is held with one hand but the player can change it from hand to hand during the bout. Strokes are made either horizontally or downward, thrusting or stabbing blows being prohibited. The scoring zones are the calves, the torso and the head.

To count, all strokes must be with the cane, and low blows must have a lunging movement. The bout is won on points, the lightness of the cane and the protective clothing making a knockout impossible. Points are scored for style, according to the correctness of body positions during fighting. Contact with prohibited areas such as the arms are penalized. It is thus possible to win a match without landing a blow on one's adversary, if he or she accumulates penalties.

== Weapon ==
- The canne (stick) is a chestnut stick that comes in two versions. The first, marked with a green line, is heavier and used for training of basic techniques. A canne used in competitions and advanced training, marked with a black line, is lighter. Lighter sticks are faster and safer to use (serious injury to one's opponent is avoided because the stick breaks first). The length of a canne is approximately 95 cm (37 in); the weight is about 120 g (4.2 oz) for green, and about 100 grams (3.5 oz) for black.
- The bâton (staff) is a two handed stick of approximately 140 cm (55 in) and 400 g (10 oz).

== Variations ==
Canne de combat has several variations:

- Canne: the basic form, using one stick
- Double canne: using two sticks
- Bâton: quarterstaff
- Double bâton: two quarterstaffs
- Canne défense: self-defense with the stick
- Canne chausson: savate kicks combined with canne techniques
- Canne fouet: a variant of canne chausson and canne défense

=== Canne ===
Canne is the biggest part of canne de combat. When playing canne, the cannistes (competitors) have a stick in their hand, wear a protective suit and a fencing helmet, and try to score more points than their opponent during the match.

Scoring zones:

- Head: the top, the sides, and front
- Torso: only for males
- Calves

During a canne bout, the cannistes must use prescribed defensive and offensive techniques, combined with jumps and vaults. There is no simultaneous attack, meaning that if one of the players has started an attack, the other must parry or evade, and is allowed to counterattack only after the evasion. An evasion can be a step, a jump or a crouch. The stick can be held either in the left or in the right hand, and changing hands during the match is permitted.

=== Double canne ===
During a double canne bout, the cannistes hold sticks in both their right and left hands. They try to score hits with both hands using similar techniques as in canne, whilst they parry and counter-attack. The two stick style allows for much faster attack and defence.

=== Bâton ===
Bâton means long stick techniques and is based on the movements of the medieval longsword and longer countryside walking stick, extended with the movement base of canne.

=== Canne défense ===
Canne défense means self-defense with the canne. The basic techniques are similar to those used in basic canne, but are expanded to include thrusts, slashes, parries and counter-attacks, neck- and hand-locks and releases from holds. During canne défense every vulnerable part of the body is considered a legitimate target: the elbow, the knee, the face, etc. It is under heavy development. Because canne défense techniques are more dangerous, there are no canne défense competitions or free sparring, only paired techniques.

=== Canne chausson ===
Canne chausson combines savate kicks with canne stick attacks.

== Techniques ==
=== Attacks ===
Canne de combat is based on six techniques, combinations, and other elements (jumps, voltes, hand switches).

- Brisé
- Croisé tête
- Latéral croisé (tête, flanc, bas: head, torso, leg/low)
- Latéral extérieur (tête, flanc, bas: head, torso, leg/low)
- Enlevé
- Croisé bas

==== Latéral extérieur ====
Assuming the cane is in your right hand:

Keeping the point of the cane to the front, turn your upper body to the right slightly as you draw back your right hand. There should be a lifting of the left heel at the same time. Once your hand has passed the line of your spine (if viewed from the side), flip the point of your cane out behind you, so that your arm and the cane is now in line, and fully extended out to the rear. Next, bring your arm and the cane around from the rear to the front, along a horizontal line. If the target is the head, remain upright as you deliver your hit. Your arm should remain straight throughout the execution of the strike as the point travels through a 180 degrees arc from the rear to the front.

There is no need to think of delivering the strike with a 'blade edge'. In fact, it's better to deliver the strike with your palm facing down, so that the thumb side of the stick strikes the target (similar to striking with the back edge of your blade). That helps enormously in keeping the arm straight throughout.

==== Latéral croisé ====
Assuming the cane is in your right hand:

Keeping the point of the cane to the front, turn you upper body to the left slightly as you draw back your right hand (palm facing up i.e. towards you) and arm across your chest. Transfer your weight slightly to your back (left) foot and raise your front heel slightly as you do so. Your hand should pass the line of your spine (if viewed from the side). Now turn your hand over (anti-clockwise), in order to flip the point of your cane out behind you, with your hand and forearm over your left shoulder, and extend the cane out to the rear as far as possible. Next, bring your arm and the cane around from the rear to the front, along a horizontal line. If the target is the head, remain upright as you deliver your hit. Your arm should remain straight throughout the execution of the strike as the point travels through a 180 degrees arc from the rear to the front.

=== Defenses ===
Acceptable defenses in canne are the parry and the evasion. An evasion can be a step, a jump or a crouch. There is no simultaneous attack, which means that if one competitor starts an attack, the other has to parry or evade and is allowed to counterattack only after the evasion.

The canne strategy does not accept the theory of "getting a small hit in order to deal a bigger hit". If player A starts to attack and, instead of defending himself, player B also starts an attack, then the following is the rule:

- If nobody hits, nobody gets a point
- If B hits, nobody gets a point
- If both A and B hit, then A gets a point (because they attacked first)

This is similar to the right of way rules of modern sport fencing.

=== Lunges ===
There are five lunges in canne.

- Avant (front)
- Arrière (behind)
- Extérieur (outside)
- Balance stance
- Grenouille (frog)

=== Valid attacks ===
Only valid attacks are counted. An attack is only considered valid if it performed using one of the techniques described above, and:

- Every strike must be armed (strikes made without the canne are considered invalid)
- The hit is clear
- The hit reached a valid target zone
- The hit is done with the upper 1/4 part of the stick
- The stick is in one line with the hand
- There was no sabering movement

== Rules ==
Bouts are held in a 9-meter diameter circle. The cane is held with one hand but the competitor may change it from hand to hand during the bout. Strokes are made either horizontally or downward, thrusting or stabbing blows being prohibited. The scoring zones are the calves, the torso (only for men) and the head.

To count, all strokes must be with the cane, and low blows must have a lunging movement. The bout is won on points, the lightness of the cane and the protective clothing making a knockout impossible. Points are scored for style, according to the correctness of body positions during fighting. Contact with prohibited areas such as the arms are penalized. It is thus possible to win a match without landing a blow on one's adversary, if they accumulate penalties.

== Bout duration and age groups ==
- Children aged 10–14 and adolescents aged 14–17: two or three rounds of one and a half minutes each
- Youth aged 17–20, adults aged 21–40, and seniors aged 41 and up: two or three rounds of two minutes each

== Grades ==
=== Blue pommel ===
- The beginning
- Technical requirements: balance, quality, the six techniques, the eight parries, dodgings
- Theory: knowledge of the weapon, and the history of the canne

=== Green pommel ===
- The two hands work together
- Topic: I touch and I am not touched
- Technical requirements: slits, voltes and framing
- Theory: Criteria of the validity of a hit (movement, valid areas)

=== Red pommel ===
- The co-operation to the opposition
- Topic: I am not touched and I touch
- Principle: defensive organization and concept of response
- Technical requirements: Shift, overflow, opposition, management of effort
- Theory: regulation cannes and bâtons, the behaviour, the equipment, players' obligations, the principles of judgement, the sanctions and penalties
- Allows to be initiator

=== White pommel ===
- Entered the confirmation
- Topic: I touch before being touched
- Principle: anticipation
- Technical requirements: behavioral diagram, sequence prepared for a demonstration, interiorization of the practice (closed eyes)
- Theory: the file of J/A, the categories of age and the various types of competition

=== Yellow pommel ===
- Pommel of the acquisition
- Topic: "I disturb for touching"
- Principle: pretence (see the article on the pretence of B. Dubreuil)
- Technical requirement: work in simple cane, double cane and stick
- Theory: to have the diploma of regional training J/A, take part at the various meetings (official and semi-official)
- Allows to be instructor

=== Pre-1985 GAT (Silver Glove all categories) vs GAT1, GAT2 and GAT3 patches ===
- Silver Glove rank of savate is also known as "Gant d'argent technique or "GAT" ( Technical Silver Glove).
- More complete, the pre-1985 BF-Savate Silver Glove rank ( combined GAT 1,2,3 and yellow pommel) requirements and included strong techniques in Canne de Combat in addition to Savate. The "true" old Box-francaise-Canne "Silver Glove" ranked individuals prior to 1985 were also " cannistes" specialists. These savateurs wear a unique GAT rectangular patch without numbers added next to the letters GAT.
- After 1985 the "BF-Savate-Canne de combat" got split into Savate-GAT1(Silver Glove 1), Savate-GAT2(Silver Glove 2) and Savate-GAT3 (Silver Glove 3). The test requirements for these new silver gloves (GAT1, GAT2, GAT3) do not include Canne de Combat and are only limited to SAVATE. The savateurs wear rectagular GAT patch which has numbers ( GAT1, GAT2, GAT3).
- "Yellow pommel" is now considered the highest rank in canne de combat. The few remaining pre-1985 GAT cannistes are probably over 59 years old. Similarly, the former FFBFSDA Professorship of BF-SAVATE requirements included Canne de Combat. New Savate instructorships tests do not have these requirements. Both sports have split although still under a same federation. These sports can be used in combinations together.

== Canne de combat in media ==
- Gérard Depardieu uses canne in the movie Vidocq to fight against the "alchemist".
- The movie Arsène Lupin contains some canne and savate.
- The movie The Tiger Brigades contains both canne and savate.
- Patrick Macnee was trained in canne for his role as John Steed in the 1960s TV series The Avengers. However, in the series, he is mostly using an umbrella, not a cane, as weapon.
- In the American series Elementary, the principal actor, Jonny Lee Miller, often trains with a canne.

== Events in canne de combat ==
- Pal I Basto
- European Championship
- World Championship

== See also ==
- Boxe Francaise
- Festival des Arts Martiaux

== Information and documentation about canne ==
- Presentation of the basic techniques
- Some old treaties of cane, stick and others
- A small booklet about CDC
- Cambridge Martial Arts
- Reprinted early 1900s information about the Vigny cane and associated techniques

== Sources and external links ==
- Official website of the Fédération Internationale de Savate for information on international and world championships
- Official website of the 2010 European Canne de combat Championships for information on the 2010 European championships
- Cambridge Academy of Martial Arts Savate and cane fighting in Cambridge, England
- American Registry of Savate Instructors and Clubs, ARSIC-International
- United States Savate Federation - Website of the official Fédération Internationale de Savate representative in the USA
- Website of a Hungarian Canne de Combat Club - Official website of the Hungarian canne de combat club
- A Hungarian La Canne Club - Hungarian Club of la canne and associated stick-fighting disciplines
- Indian Ocean Canne de Combat - Reunion Island - Mauritius - Madagascar
- The network of clubs in Bordeaux: video presentation of the basic techniques, history and culture ...
