= Edward William Barton-Wright =

British businessman (1860–1951)

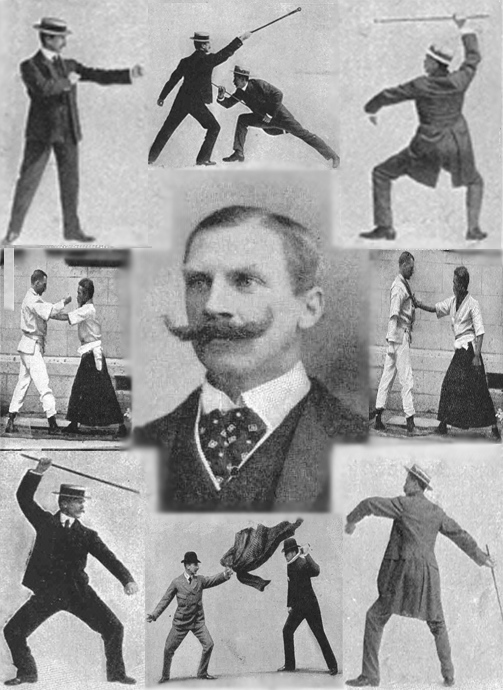
- A montage of techniques from Bartitsu. Barton-Wright is pictured in the middle.
- Born: Edward William Wright; 8 November 1860; Bangalore, Madras, India
- Died: 13 September 1951 (aged 90); Kingston-upon-Thames, Surrey, England
- Style: Bartitsu

Edward William Barton-Wright (8 November 1860 – 13 September 1951) was an English entrepreneur specialising in both self defence training and physical therapy. He is remembered today as one of the first Europeans to both learn and teach Japanese martial arts and as a pioneer of the concept of hybrid martial arts.

== Early life ==
He was born Edward William Wright on 8 November 1860 in Bangalore, Madras, India. E.W. Wright was educated at Dedham Grammar School, Essex, at Lens, Pas-de-Calais in France, and in Germany. He then worked as a clerk for the Lancashire and Yorkshire Railway before embarking on a career as a civil and mining engineer. He worked as manager for his father's mining interests based near Odemira in the Alentejo region of Portugal, from 1886 to 1892, without success. In April 1892, he legally assumed the name Edward William Barton-Wright. Returning to England in 1892, he promoted a company, Barton Wright Ltd., antimony specialists, at Millwall, London, but was declared personally bankrupt for the first time the following year. He then worked for mining companies in Egypt and the Straits Settlements (modern day Malaysia and Singapore).

== Establishing Bartitsu ==
In a 1950 interview Barton-Wright professed to having had a "lifelong interest in the arts of self defence" and earlier interviews indicated that he had studied various fighting systems during his travels as a young man. While working as an antimony smelting specialist for the E.H. Hunter Company in Kobe, Japan (c. 1895–1898), Barton-Wright studied jujutsu in at least two styles, including the Shinden Fudo-ryū in Kobe and Kodokan judo in Tokyo.

Upon returning to England in early 1898, Barton-Wright combined these martial arts to form his own method of self-defence training, which he called Bartitsu. Over the next two years, he also added elements of British boxing, French savate and the la canne (stick fighting) style of Swiss master Pierre Vigny.

In 1899, Barton-Wright wrote an article titled "How to Pose as a Strong Man", detailing the mechanical and leverage principles employed in performing various feats of strength. He also produced a two-part essay entitled "the New Art of Self Defence" which was published in both the English and American editions of Pearson's Magazine. Excerpts of Barton-Wright's articles were re-printed in numerous British, American, New Zealand and Australian newspapers.

In 1900, Barton-Wright established the Bartitsu School of Arms and Physical Culture at 67b Shaftesbury Avenue in London's Soho district. The school offered classes in a range of self-defence disciplines and combat sports as well as various physical therapies involving the electrical application of heat, light, vibration, and radiation. Club members included soldiers, athletes, actors, politicians and some aristocrats. During the next few years, Barton-Wright organised numerous exhibitions of self-defence techniques and also promoted tournament competitions at music halls throughout London, in which his Bartitsu Club champions were challenged by wrestlers in various European styles.

In 1901, Barton-Wright published additional articles that detailed the Bartitsu method of fighting with a walking stick or umbrella.

In The Adventure of the Empty House, Sir Arthur Conan Doyle, the author of the Sherlock Holmes stories, referred to Bartitsu (misspelled as "baritsu") in explaining how Holmes had defeated Professor Moriarty in hand-to-hand combat at the brink of the Reichenbach Falls.

During early 1902, Barton-Wright organised and promoted the "Great Anglo-Japanese Tournament" tour, which featured Bartitsu demonstrations and contests in provincial centers including Nottingham, the Sandringham Military Base, Oxford, Cambridge University and Lancashire.

== Later life ==
By 1903, the Bartitsu Club had closed down. Subsequently, Barton-Wright mostly abandoned self-defence instruction in favour of his interests in physical therapy. He established a series of clinics at various locations throughout London, and continued to work as a physical therapist for the remainder of his career.

His therapeutic business, specialising in the use of various electrical appliances to treat the pain of gout and rheumatism, was viewed with suspicion by the London medical establishment and was subject to bankruptcy proceedings on several occasions during the first three decades of the 20th century. These included a damaging and acrimonious suit brought about by Wilson Rae, a former employee who had become a business rival and who was subsequently jailed on charges of fraud and bigamy. Barton-Wright's financial problems were compounded by a series of investments in unsuccessful inventions and other ventures, including an electrical display planned for an Amsterdam music hall.

E.W. Barton-Wright was not included in his father's last will and testament, although he did execute a portion of the will on behalf of one of his brothers, who was named as a beneficiary, in 1915.

Comparatively little is known about Barton-Wright's life during the period 1930–1950. From 1938 onwards, his medical clinic was in his own home, at No. 50 Surbiton Road, Surbiton. He is referred to as a "famous physiotherapist and judoist" in Attempted Rescue, the 1966 autobiography of English horror writer Robert Aickman, who recalled Barton-Wright as an acquaintance of his great-aunt's.

In 1950, Barton-Wright was interviewed by Gunji Koizumi, the founder of the London Budokwai judo club. Later that year he was presented to an audience at a Budokwai gathering, being introduced as the pioneer of Japanese martial arts in Europe.

Barton-Wright died on 13 September 1951 at his home at 50 Surbiton Road, Kingston-upon-Thames, Surrey, England, aged ninety, unmarried and in circumstances of some poverty. He was buried on 17 September in an unmarked grave at Kingston Cemetery in Surrey.

== Commemorations ==
It was not until the late 1990s that E.W. Barton-Wright's historical significance was recognised, largely through research carried out by British martial arts historians Richard Bowen and Graham Noble and then by members of the Bartitsu Society.

In 2004, members of the Bartitsu Society initiated a fund-raising project towards commemorating Barton-Wright, in honour of his pioneering work in the martial arts.

Barton-Wright was the subject of dedications in both the 2005 and 2008 volumes of The Bartitsu Compendium and the annual Bartitsu School of Arms and Physical Culture conference (2011–present) is also dedicated to his memory. His life and career are detailed in the 2011 documentary Bartitsu: The Lost Martial Art of Sherlock Holmes.

In June 2012, Barton-Wright was commemorated in a wall display in the Sherlock Holmes Collection at Marylebone Library, London and in an entry in the Oxford Dictionary of National Biography. In February 2013 he was prominently featured in the BBC Four Timeshift documentary Everybody was Kung Fu Fighting: the Rise of the Martial Arts in Britain.

== Popular culture ==
Cyrus Barker, the protagonist of novelist Will Thomas' Barker and Llewellyn mystery series, is partly inspired by E.W. Barton-Wright, as is the villainous Sir Callum Fielding-Shaw in Adrienne Kress' young adult novel The Friday Society.

E. W. Barton-Wright and Bartitsu are featured in the Ministry of Peculiar Occurrences steampunk novels by Pip Ballantyne and Tee Morris.

Barton-Wright is depicted as an ally and trainer of a secret society of female bodyguards who protect the leaders of the radical suffragettes in the graphic novel trilogy Suffrajitsu: Mrs. Pankhurst's Amazons (2015), in the spin-off novellas Carried Away, The Second-Story Girl and The Isle of Dogs and also in the 2015 short story The Wrestler and the Diamond Ring.

== See also ==
- Judo in the United Kingdom
