= OSS =

OSS or Oss may refer to:

== Places ==
- Oss, a city and municipality in the Netherlands
- Osh Airport, IATA code OSS

== People with the name ==
- Oss (surname), a surname

== Arts and entertainment ==
- O.S.S. (film), a 1946 World War II spy film about Office of Strategic Services agents
- Oss (film), a 1976 Norwegian post-apocalyptic disaster film
- O.S.S. (TV series), a British spy series which aired in 1957 in the UK and the US
- Open Source Shakespeare, a non-commercial website with texts and statistics on Shakespeare's plays
- Old Syriac Sinaiticus, a Bible manuscript
- Organization of Super Spies, a fictional organization in the Spy Kids franchise

== Education ==
- ÖSS (Öğrenci Seçme Sınavı), a former university entrance exam in Turkey
- Options Secondary School, Chula Vista, California
- Otto Stern School for Integrated Doctoral Education, Frankfurt am Main, Germany
- Outram Secondary School, Singapore
- Out-of-school suspension, a form of school discipline considered more severe than in-school suspension

== Organizations ==
- Observatoire du Sahara et du Sahel, dedicated to fighting desertification and drought; based in Tunis, Tunisia
- Office for Science and Society, Science Education from Montreal's McGill University
- Office of Strategic Services, World War II forerunner of the Central Intelligence Agency
- Office of the Supervising Scientist, an Australian Government body under the Supervising Scientist
- One-stop shop, a government office where multiple services are offered in a centralized location rather than in different places
- Open Spaces Society, a UK registered charity championing public paths and open spaces
- Operations Support Squadron, a United States Air Force support squadron
- Optimized Systems Software, a former software company

== Science and technology ==
- Ohio Sky Survey, of extragalactic radio sources
- Optical SteadyShot, a lens-based image stabilization system by Sony
- Optimal Stereo Sound, another name for the Jecklin Disk recording technique
- Oriented spindle stop, a type of spindle motion used within some G-code cycles
- Ovary-sparing spay
- Overspeed Sensor System, part of the Train Protection & Warning System for railroad trains

=== Computer software and hardware ===
- Operations support system, computers used by telecommunications service providers to administer and maintain network systems
- Open Sound System, a standard interface for making and capturing sound in Unix operating systems
- OpenSearchServer, search engine software
- Open-source software, software with its source code made freely available
  - GPT-OSS (stylized as gpt-oss), a set of open-weight reasoning models released by OpenAI on August 5, 2025

== Other uses ==
- Operation Southern Spear, a US military campaign
- Order of St. Sava, a Serbian decoration
- Ossetic language, in the Caucasus (ISO 639 code: oss)
- Oss (greeting), a casual Japanese salutation
- Óss (rune) or Ansuz, a character of the Elder Futhark

== See also ==
- Import OSS (IOSS)
- EU OSS
- Non-EU OSS
- Mini One Stop Shop (MOSS)
- AAS (disambiguation)
- Hoz (disambiguation)
- OS (disambiguation)
