= List of judoka =

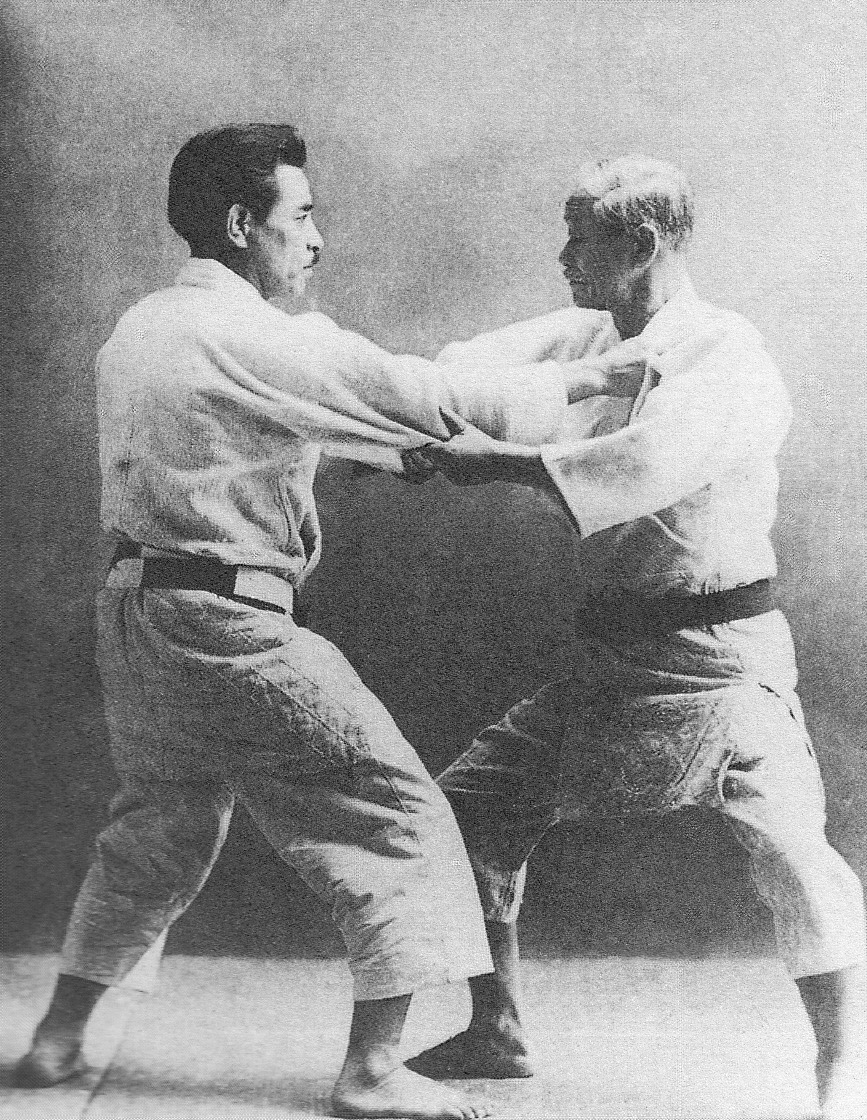
Kyuzo Mifune and Jigoro Kano

This is a list of highly notable judoka (judo practitioners).

== Founder ==
- Jigorō Kanō (Japan, 1860–1938) founded judo, and established the Kōdōkan in 1882. Judo was the first Japanese martial art to gain widespread international recognition, and the first to become an official Olympic sport. Kanō was also a pioneer of international sports. Accomplishments included being the first Asian member of the International Olympic Committee (IOC). His official honours and decorations included the First Order of Merit and Grand Order of the Rising Sun and the Third Imperial Degree. He was inducted to the IJF Hall of Fame on 14 May 1999. The IJF Hall of Fame was established in 1999.

== Highest grades ==
A number of living judoka have been promoted to 10th dan by the Olympic Games-affiliated International Judo Federation. Some national (country) associations, continental unions and independent (often multi-style) bodies have also promoted judoka to 10th dan.

Only fifteen people have been promoted to 10th dan by the Kōdōkan. Twelve were promoted between 1935 and 1984. The other three were promoted together on 8 January 2006. However, as of October 2022-end, all three of the 2006 promotion receivers are deceased.

=== Male – Kōdōkan 10th dan ===
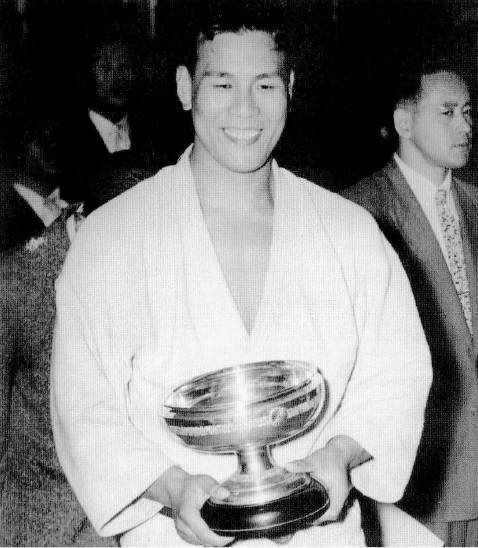
Toshirō Daigo after being crowned All-Japan Judo Champion in 1954

- Yoshitsugu Yamashita (Japan, 1865–1935) (his first name is sometimes mispronounced as Yoshiaki) promoted to Kōdōkan 10th dan in 1935, the first person awarded 10th dan by the Kōdōkan. Although he was promoted posthumously his promotion was antedated to be effective two days before his passing. He was also a pioneer of judo in the United States, where he taught judo to President Theodore Roosevelt.
- Hajime Isogai (Japan, 1871–1947) promoted to Kōdōkan 10th dan in 1937. He was the first person to receive and actually hold this rank while still alive.
- Hideichi Nagaoka (Japan, 1876–1952) (his first name is sometimes mispronounced as either Hidekazu or Shūichi) promoted to Kōdōkan 10th dan in 1937. He was the last of only three people to be promoted to 10th dan by Kanō-shihan himself.
- Kyūzō Mifune (Japan, 1883–1965) promoted to Kōdōkan 10th dan in 1945 under the presidency of Jirō Nangō. Mifune is considered to be one of the greatest judo technicians ever. Mifune also held the title of Meijin and the rank of 10th dan awarded by the Kokusai Budō Renmei/IMAF.
- Kunisaburō Iizuka (Japan, 1875–1958) promoted to Kōdōkan 10th dan in 1946.
- Kaichirō Samura (Japan, 1880–1964) promoted to Kōdōkan 10th dan in 1948.
- Shotarō Tabata (Japan, 1884–1950) promoted to Kōdōkan 10th dan in 1948.
- Yoshitarō Okano (Japan, 1885–1967) promoted to Kōdōkan 10th dan in 1967.
- Matsutarō Shōriki (Japan, 1885–1969) promoted to Kōdōkan 10th dan in 1969. He was also known as the father of Japanese professional baseball.
- Shōzō Nakano (Japan, 1888–1977) promoted to Kōdōkan 10th dan in 1977.
- Tamio Kurihara (Japan, 1896–1979) promoted to Kōdōkan 10th dan in 1979.
- Sumiyuki Kotani (Japan, 1903–1991) promoted to Kōdōkan 10th dan in 1984.
- Ichirō Abe (Japan, 1922–2022) promoted to Kōdōkan 10th dan on 8 January 2006, at age 83. Abe was international chairperson of the All Nippon Judo Federation and had strong links internationally through coaching in Europe.
- Toshirō Daigo (Japan, 1926–2021) promoted to Kōdōkan 10th dan on 8 January 2006, at age 80. Daigo was a two-time winner of the All Nippon Judo Tournament (1951 and 1954), and a former manager of the Japanese national team, and until his retirement was the Chief-Instructor at the Kōdōkan. Daigo was known by the nickname Mr. Kōdōkan.
- Yoshimi Ōsawa (Japan, 1926–2022) promoted to Kōdōkan 10th dan on 8 January 2006, at age 79. Ōsawa coached at the Kōdōkan for a long time, and was recognised for his support of women's judo. Ōsawa was known by the nickname Current Ushiwakamaru (Ushiwakamaru was the childhood name of a legendary twelfth-century samurai who was small but quick.)

=== Male – International Judo Federation 10th dan ===
- Charlie Palmer (United Kingdom, 1930–2001), IJF 10th Dan (promoted in 1996), was the first non-Japanese to be the President of the IJF. He was inducted to the IJF Hall of Fame on 8 September 2003.
- Anton Geesink (Netherlands, 1934–2010), IJF 10th Dan (promoted in 1997), was the first non-Japanese ever to have won a World Championship. He was inducted to the IJF Hall of Fame on 8 September 2003.
- George Kerr (United Kingdom, 1937–) IJF 10th dan (promoted in 2010).
- Yoshihirō ‘Yosh’ Uchida (United States, 1920–2024), USA Judo 10th dan, July 19, 2013 - subsequently acknowledged and recognized by the IJF. Head judo coach at San Jose State University for over 70 years, and served as the coach of the first US Olympic Judo Team at the 1964 Games held in Tokyo.
- Franco Capelletti (Italy, 1938–) IJF 10th dan (promoted in August 2017). Capelletti is a former Technical Director (1975–1988) and (2004–2008) and vice-president (2004–2016) of the Italian Judo Federation FIJLKAM, Sports Director of the EJU (1995–2003), and President of the IJF Kata Commission (2008-date). The intent to promote Capellettti to this rank was announced in July 2017, with the promotion being awarded in August 2017 at the Senior World Judo Championships in Budapest.
- Jean-Luc Rougé (France, 1949–) IJF 10th dan (promoted in December 2023).
- Peter Herrmann (Germany/Australia, 1941–) IJF 10th dan (promoted in October 2024).

=== Male – 10th dan, National Governing Body or Continental Union ===
- Mikinosuke Kawaishi (Japan/France, 1899–1969) FFJDA (French Judo Federation) 10th dan
- Seok Jin-gyeong (Korea, 1912–1990) (his surname is also sometimes spelled Suk), Korean Judo Association (KJA), 1990. First Korean to be promoted to the rank of 10th dan.
- Shin Do-hwan (Korea, approx. 1920–2004), KJA 10th dan, promoted approx. 2000.
- Chae Jung Gyum Suhn Sang Nim (Korea, date of birth currently unknown–2007) (his name is also sometimes spelled Lee Suhn Sang Nim), KJA 10th dan, May 20, 2007.
- Henri Courtine (France, 1930–2021), FFJDA 10th dan (promoted in 2007).
- Jeremy L. Glick (United States, 1970–2001), USJA Honorary 10th dan, September 17, 2008. A press release in 2011 from the USJA mentions George Harris' 10th dan promotion as the first USJA 10th dan promotion hence suggesting that Glick's promotion was an honorary promotion.
- Jaap Nauwelaerts de Agé (Netherlands, 1917–2016), Dutch Judo Federation (JBN), 10th dan, November 15, 2008.
- Yi Bang-geun (Korea/US, 1924–) (his surname is also sometimes spelled Lee), KJA 10th dan, January 2010.
- Jang Kyeong-sun (Korea, 1922–2022) (his name is also sometimes spelled Chang Kyung Soon), KJA 10th dan, date of promotion unknown.
- George Harris (United States, 1933–2011), USJA 10th dan, January 15, 2011. First 10th dan recognized by the three major judo organizations in the US. Placed 5th in the 1956 World Championships, won six Air Force judo championships, four US National titles, two gold medals in the Pan-American Games, and represented the United States in the 1964 Olympics, and was one of the leaders of the Armed Forces Judo Association (AFJA) that later evolved into the United States Judo Association (USJA), founded in 1968.
- Karl Geis (United States, 1933–2014), USJA 10th dan, March 12, 2014. Geis was one of the founders of the USJA. During the late 1950s and early 1960s Geis practiced in Japan where his judo sensei included Osawa, Daigo, Kotani, Kudo, Miyake, Kobayashi, and Ushijima. Miyake Tsunako and Tomiki Kenji were his primary Aikido teachers, from which he received Rokudan directly from Tomiki-shihan. Upon his return to the US he opened his own dōjō in Houston which he ran until shortly before his death on April 7, 2014. Geis contributed to the development of some of our early U.S. judo Olympians and many well-known American judo leaders.
- Massao Shinohara (Brazil, 1925–2020), Brazilian National Federation 10th dan, 18 November 2017.
- Haruo Imamura (1933–2017), previously a Kōdōkan 8th dan (since 2000) and a USJF 9th dan (since 2007), was posthumously promoted to judo 10th dan by the USJF on May 12, 2018. In 1956 Imamura was captain of Tenri University's successful judo team. He later moved to the US, where he won the 1960 US Nationals in the -180 lbs division and also won the overall Grand Champion title.
- Jim Bregman (United States, 1941–), USJA 10th dan, January 19, 2018. Bregman represented the U.S. at judo in the 1964 Tokyo Olympic Games, winning a bronze medal in the under 60 kg category. He was presented with his 10 dan certificate on July 7, 2018.
- Harold E. Sharp (United States, 4-9-1927 to 3-21-2021), Nanka 10th dan, November 12, 2020. The Nanka Judo Yudanshakai (SoCal Judo Association) recognized by Jigoro Kano in 1930, bestowed the highest rank on Sensei Harold E. Sharp 'Hal'. Known worldwide for his 1955 book 'The Sport of Judo' and subsequent books including his latest ' The Road to Black Belt', Sharp Sensei was gifted by the Prince of Japan in 1954 for great achievements in Japan for winning an international judo competition, and being instrumental to the growth of judo after WWII leading to its inclusion in the Olympics. The Hal Sharp Teacher's Foundation documents his 75+ years of dedication to spreading judo's positive philosophy.
- Kyu-ha Kim (United States, 1935–2021), USJA 10th dan, May 17, 2021. Kim was two-time Grand Champion of South Korea in the late 1950s prior to his move to the United States in 1960 where he settled in Pittsburgh, PA. He ran his own judo school and developed a cadre of renown students including Gary Goltz and was the US Olympic Judo Coach in 1980. He also taught judo at the University of Pittsburgh since 1972.

=== Independent Bodies, 10th dan ===
- Kazuo Itō (Japan, 1898–1974), Kokusai Budō Renmei/IMAF, 10th dan Meijin (promotion date unknown). Itō, a student of Mifune, also held the rank of Kōdōkan 9th dan.
- Taksasue Itō (Japan, 1887–1981), Kokusai Budō Renmei/IMAF, 10th dan Meijin (promotion date unknown). Itō, a previous personal secretary to Jigorō Kanō, also held the rank of Kōdōkan 9th dan.
- Tokuji Oshita (Japan, date of birth unknown) (in some sources his first name omitted and instead substituted by the initial K.), Kokusai Budō Renmei/IMAF, 10th dan Meijin (promotion date unknown).
- Philip S. Porter (United States, 1925–2011), USMA 10th dan, January 1, 2005.
- Dieter Teige (Germany, 1939–), Deutsches Dan Kollegium, 10th dan, October 30, 2010. Teige, a former president of the Deutsches Dan Kollegium, is the first German 10th dan-holder. His rank is recognized neither by the national governing body, the German Judo Federation (DJB) nor was it homologated by the International Judo Federation.
- Brian Jacks (UK, 1946–), still listed with his official judo rank of 8th dan since November 1994, is now also listed by a British multi-martial arts organization called World Martial Arts Council, as a 10th dan. No specific promotion date was mentioned. Brian Jacks was the first judoka to win a medal in the World Championships for the UK (bronze, 1967, Salt Lake City). He also competed at three Olympic Games - winning bronze, 1972, Munich.
- Jack Hearn (UK, 1923–), FESECAM 10th dan September 2020. Achievements unknown.

=== Female – 10th dan, National Governing Body ===
- Keiko Fukuda (Japan/United States, 1913–2013), USA Judo and USJF 10th dan (promoted in 2011), Kōdōkan Joshi 9th dan. She was part of a group of three women, including also Masako Noritomi, who were the first to be promoted to Joshi 6th dan after a glass ceiling prior to 1972 apparently held back women from being awarded promotions above Joshi 5th dan. Fukuda also was the first woman to be promoted to Joshi 9th dan by the Kōdōkan and the 32nd or 33rd person in the world ever to be promoted to 10th dan in judo.

== Pioneers ==
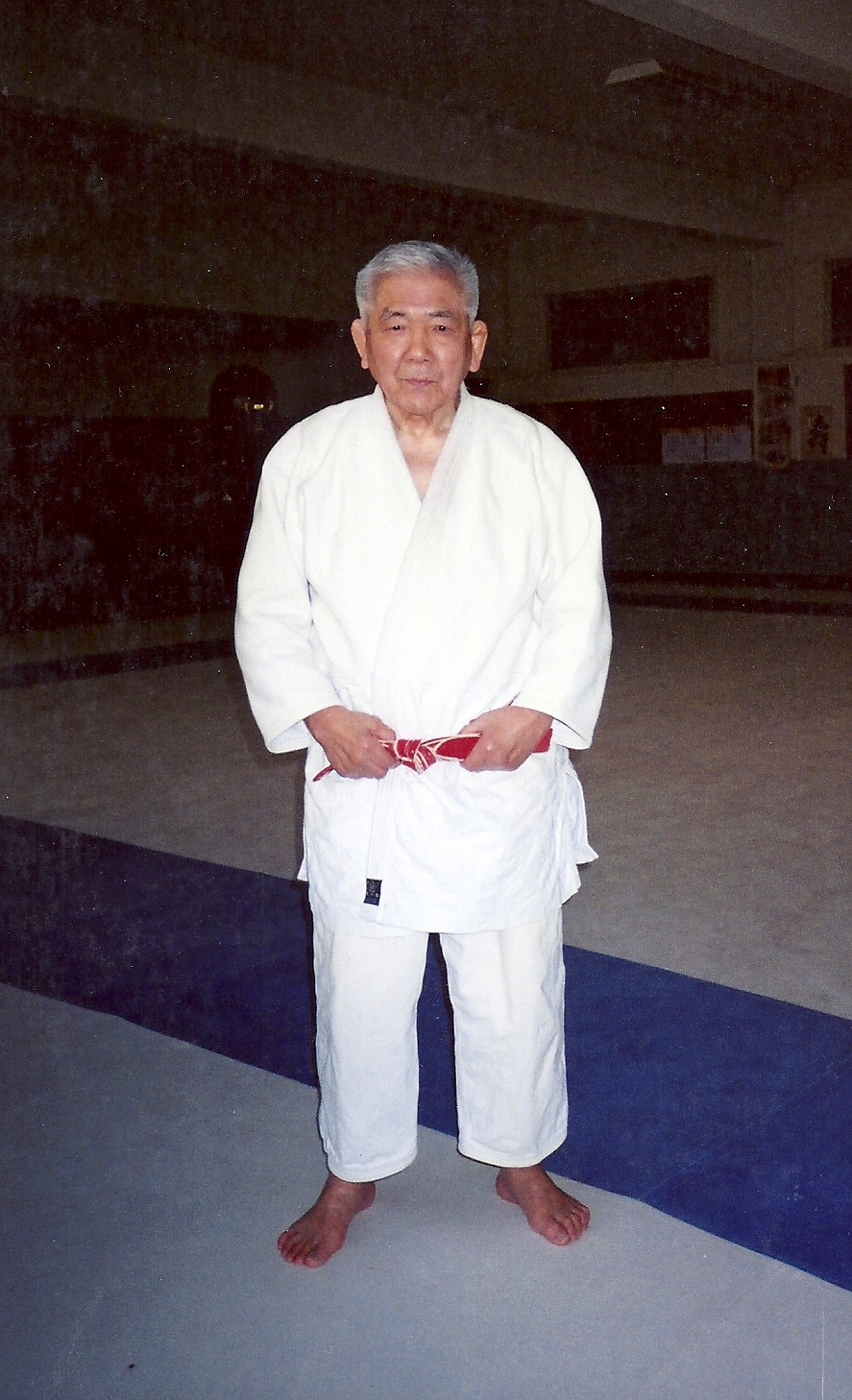
Shozo Awazu in Paris, in 2003, Kōdōkan 9th dan, pioneer of judo in France

- Kenshiro Abbe (Japan, 1915–1985), Kōdōkan 8th dan, was the youngest student to gain his 4th Dan in Judo. Founded the British Judo Council alongside Masutaro Otani. He also founded the British Kendo Council, the British Karate Council, and the International Budo Council, and is credited with the introduction of aikido to the UK and Europe.
- Masutaro Otani (Japan, 1896–1977), 8th Dan was a master of judo and a pioneer of judo in the United Kingdom. He founded the British Judo Council alongside Kenshiro Abbe. He was also the leading student of Yukio Tani, another pioneer of judo and jujutsu in the UK.
- Shozo Awazu (Japan/France, 1923–2016), Kōdōkan 9th dan, pioneer of judo in France.
- Haku Michigami (Japan/France, 1912–2002), FFJDA (French Judo Federation) 9th dan, Kōdōkan 7th dan, sent in France by Tamio Kurihara (10th dan) in 1953. Teacher of Anton Geesink.
- Kiyoshi Kobayashi (Japan, 1925-2013), Kōdōkan 9th dan, was the «father» of Portuguese judo and one of the founders of the Portuguese Judo Federation.
- Masahiko Kimura (Japan, 1917–1993), Kōdōkan 7th dan, defeated Helio Gracie, only lost four times in his entire career.
- Gunji Koizumi (Japan, 1885–1965), Kōdōkan 8th dan, president and founder of the Budokwai. He spent over sixty-four years in judo, teaching it until the day before he died in April 1965.
- Tsunejirō Tomita (Japan, 1865–1937), Kōdōkan 7th dan, teacher of Mitsuyo Maeda. One of the first two students to be awarded Kōdōkan first grade (shodan). One of the four Guardians of the Kōdōkan.
- Shirō Saigō (Japan, 1886–1922), Kōdōkan 5th dan. One of the first two students to be awarded Kōdōkan first grade (shodan), and the first student to be promoted by Jigorō Kanō to Kōdōkan 4th dan. One of the four Guardians of the Kōdōkan. Inspiration for Akira Kurosawa's 1943 directorial debut, Sugata Sanshirō.
- Sakujirō Yokoyama (Japan, 1864–1912), Kōdōkan 8th dan. First person to obtain the rank of 8th dan (was also the first 6th and 7th dan but shared this honor together with Yoshitsugu Yamashita), and one of the earliest disciples of Jigorō Kanō, considered the most formidable of all judo experts of his time. One of the four Guardians of the Kōdōkan.
- Mitsuyo Maeda (Japan, 1878–1941), Kōdōkan 7th dan, pioneer of judo in Brazil, the UK, and other countries, fundamental to the creation of Brazilian jiu-jitsu.
- Kenji Tomiki (Japan, 1900–1979), Kōdōkan 8th dan and Aikido 8th dan. Tomiki is perhaps best known in the judo world for his significant role in the committee that developed Kodokan Goshin Jutsu. His work Judo Appendix: Aikido, published in 1956, is considered a classic.
- Minoru Mochizuki (Japan, 1907–2003), Kōdōkan 8th dan and Aikido 10th dan. Under the tutelage of Jigorō Kanō, the founder of judo, Mochizuki became the youngest member of the Kobudō Kenkyūkai – an organization for the study, preservation and development of classical martial arts – established within the Kōdōkan. In 1930, he was sent by Jigorō Kanō to study aikijujutsu with Morihei Ueshiba. He was the uchi-deshi of Morihei Ueshiba at the Kōbukan dōjō for one year before opening his own dōjō in Shizuoka City in 1931.
- Ryuzo Ogawa (Japan/Brazil, 1883–1975), Kōdōkan 8th dan, pioneer of judo in Brazil, founder of the Brazilian Budokan Association.

== Notable competitors ==
=== Male ===
- Jonathan Gavin (Scottish, 1966 - 2013), World Masters Judo Champion 2001 in Arizona, 6th Dan.
- Anton Geesink (Netherlands, 1934–2010), World Champion 1961 as first Judoka not from Japan, Olympic Champion 1964 in Tokio, 20-times European champion, First European Judoka with highest Dangrade 10th Dan.
- Ezio Gamba (Italy, 1958-), Olympic gold and silver medalist, first Italian who won Olympic gold, currently is the coach of Russian team.
- Neil Adams (Great Britain, 1958-), World Champion 1981 (first non Japanese to win the title in u78kg), Olympic Silver Medallist in 1980 Moscow & 1984 Los Angeles, 5x European Champion in two consecutive weights 71 kg & 78 kg, 9th Dan presented by the IJF in Paris 2019.
- Ilias Iliadis (Greece, 1984–), Olympic gold and bronze medalist and gold medalist on Masters and three times world champion).
- Teddy Riner (France, 1989–), three-time Olympic gold medalist and eleven-time World Champion.
- David Douillet (France, 1969–), two-time Olympic gold medalist and four-time World Champion.
- Isao Okano (Japan, 1944–), Olympic gold medalist, World Champion, and two time All-Japan champion.
- Kosei Inoue (Japan, 1978–), Olympic gold medalist and three-time World Champion.
- Ole Bischof (Germany, 1979–), Olympic gold and silver medalist.
- Udo Quellmalz (Germany, 1967–), Olympic gold and bronze medalist and two times World Champion).
- Jeon Ki-young (South Korea, 1973–), Olympic gold medalist and three-time World Champion.
- Toshihiko Koga (Japan, 1967–2021), Olympic gold medalist and three-time World Champion.
- Wim Ruska (Netherlands, 1940–2015), two-time Olympic gold medalist and two-time Olympic World Champion.
- Hitoshi Saitō (Japan, 1961–2015), two-time Olympic gold medalist and World Champion. Coached 2004 Japanese Olympic judo team.
- Yasuhirō Yamashita (Japan, 1957–), four-time World Champion and one-time Olympic gold medalist. Compiled a streak of 203 victories (with 7 draws) up until his retirement.
- Hidehiko Yoshida (Japan, 1969–), World Champion, Olympic gold medalist, and MMA fighter.
- Tadahirō Nomura (Japan, 1974–), 3-times olympic gold medalist and one-time World Champion (under 60 kg)
- Antal Kovács (Hungary, 1972–), first Hungarian Olympic gold medalist and World Champion, ten-time World Cup Champion, six-time International Tournament winner.
- Peter Seisenbacher (Austria, 1960–), two-time Olympic gold medalist and one-time World Champion.
- Barry Pardue Youngest Hall of Fame Inductee, 2 time Naga World Champion
- Lukáš Krpálek (Czech Republic, 1990–) world champion, European champion and two-time Olympic gold medalist (-100 kg and +100 kg). He is the most successful judoka in Czech and Czechoslovak history.
- Joseph Howard (USA/Thailand) - Began training in Judo in 2010, but got into it full time in 2025. He is a well known author, beekeeper, teacher, and martial arts instructor.

=== Female ===
- Noriko Anno (Japan, 1976–), Olympic gold medalist and four-time World Champion.
- Ingrid Berghmans (Belgium, 1961–), six-time World Champion.
- Driulis González (Cuba, 1973–), Olympic gold medalist and three-time World Champion.
- Kye Sun-hui (North Korea, 1979–), Olympic gold medalist and four-time World Champion.
- Ryōko Tani (Japan, 1976–), two-time Olympic gold medalist and seven-time World Champion.
- Masae Ueno (Japan, 1979–), two-time Olympic gold medalist and two-time World Champion.
- Ayumi Tanimoto (Japan, 1981–), two-time Olympic gold medalist
- Xian Dongmei (China, 1975–), two-time Olympic gold medalist
- Tong Wen (China, 1983–), Olympic gold medalist and seven-time World Champion.
- Ulla Werbrouck (Belgium, 1972–), Olympic gold medalist and six-time European champion.
- Majlinda Kelmendi (Kosovo, 1991−) Olympic gold medalist, two-time world Champion, two-times European champion, 1st Kosovar Olympic gold medalist in Judo.
- Kayla Harrison (United States, 1990–), two-time Olympic Gold Medalist, World Champion
- Ronda Rousey (United States, 1987–), Rousey became the first American woman to earn an Olympic medal in Judo at the Summer Olympics in Beijing in 2008 and first female UFC champion.
- Paula Pareto (Argentina, 1986–) She was world champion in 2015 and winner of a bronze medal at the 2008 Beijing Olympics and a gold medal at the 2016 Rio de Janeiro Olympics. She became the first Argentine woman to be Olympic champion and the first athlete from Argentina that won two Olympic medals in individual disciplines. In 2021, she became the first Argentine to carry the Olympic flag at the opening ceremony of the 2020 Tokyo Olympics, representing the American continent.
- Clarisse Agbegnenou (France, 1992–), Olympic gold medalist, six-time World Champion and five-time European champion.

== Famous judo deaths ==
- Jonathan Gavin (1966 – 2013) – Scottish judoka and model best known for winning the Gold medal in the (‍–‍81 kg) division at the 2001 World Masters. During the 1990s and 2000s, he appeared in advertisements and small television roles. he died on February 5, 2013, at the age of 46, cause of death Brain Tumor.
- Craig Fallon (1982 – 2019) Competing primarily in the extra-lightweight (–60 kg) division, he achieved legendary status by becoming one of only two British men concurrently to hold both World and European titles. he died on July 15, 2019, at the age of 36, cause of death Suicide
- Claudia Heill (1982 – 2011) Austrian judoka Coached from childhood by Hubert Rohrauer, she rose to prominence as one of Austria's most decorated domestic judo athletes, famously making history as the first Austrian woman ever to win an Olympic judo medal. she died on March 31, 2011, at the age of 29, cause of death Suicide
- Jack Hatton (1995 – 2019) American judoka Competing in the half-middleweight (–81 kg) division, Hatton was widely recognized as one of the most promising young talents in United States judo and a frontrunner to represent Team USA at the Tokyo 2020 Olympic Games. he died on September 24, 2019, at the age of 24, cause of death Suicide.
- Maricet Espinosa (1990 – 2024) was a prominent Cuban judoka. Competing in the half-middleweight (–63 kg) division, she established herself as one of Cuba's elite martial artists of her generation, capturing multiple continental titles and representing her nation on the Olympic stage, she died on January 21, 2024, at the age of 34, cause of death Heart Attack.
- Grigory Verichev (1957 – 2006) was a legendary Soviet judoka who is widely regarded as one of the most consistent and decorated heavyweight competitors in the history of the sport. Competing at the absolute pinnacle of international judo during the 1980s, the Chelyabinsk-based powerhouse was celebrated for an unbelievable competitive standard, reportedly participating in 187 international tournaments and never returning home without a medal, he died on May 25, 2006, at the age of 49, cause of death Vascular Disease.

== Others ==
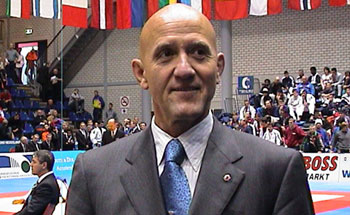
Jan Snijders

- Trevor Leggett (United Kingdom), (1914–2000) was one of the first Europeans to study martial arts in Japan, and the first Western ever to hold the rank of 6th dan in judo awarded by the Kōdōkan (or any other organization) (January 1955). Leggett was also a scholar and prolific writer on Japanese culture. He was honoured for this by being awarded the Order of the Sacred Treasure by the Emperor of Japan in 1984.
- Willy Cahill (US, 1935–), has been teaching and coaching Judo since 1963. His pupils have captured more than 1200 national and international titles[3]. A former judo coach at Stanford, Cahill was the U.S. Olympic judo mentor in 1988. He also coached the U.S. national judo team from 1980 to 1990.
- Anthony Clarke (Australia, 1961–), two-time World blind judo champion and gold medalist in the paralympics. Two-time Australian champion against sighted opponents.
- Gene LeBell (US, 1932–2022), two time AAU Judo Champion. Later turned to wrestling, stunt work, and refereeing matches including Muhammad Ali vs. Antonio Inoki. Prolific author.
- Gokor Chivichyan (Armenia, 1963–), United States Ju-Jitsu Federation 7th dan in judo, mostly known from sambo, MMA, and popular Internet websites.
- Jason Morris (US, 1967–), 8th dan 92 Olympic Silver Medalist with 20 gold medals in international competition, 2008 Olympic coach.
- Henry Okamura (US, 1924–2005), 8th dan, four times national champion.
- Jan Snijders (Netherlands, 1943–), instructor and referee at the World Championships and Olympic games. Awarded a silver medal by the International Judo Federation in 2003 for his contributions to judo. 8th dan grade holder.
- Rena Kanokogi (US, 1935–2009), 7th dan, dubbed "founding mother" of Judo for fighting for equal women's rights and competitions in the sport.
- Vladimir Putin (Russian Federation, 1952–), Putin was awarded 8th dan in 2012 and became the first Russian to have been awarded the eighth dan, joining a handful of judo fighters in the world who have achieved such status. Putin was awarded 7th dan in 2009 and 6th dan (prestigious red & white belt) at the Kodokan in 2000. In the 1970s, he was awarded a Master of Sports in both judo and sambo. Putin has described judo as "my favorite sport", and he continues to practice it.
- Naoki Murata, (Japan, 1949–2020), 8th dan. Authored many books on judo, curator of the Kōdōkan Judo Museum.
- Ilham Zakiyev (Azerbaijan, 1980–), two-time World and five-time blind judo champion and two-time gold medalist in the paralympics.
- Kyu-ha Kim (Korea, 1935–2021) 10th dan two-time Grand Champion of South Korea in the late 1950s

== See also ==
- List of celebrity judoka
- List of Olympic medalists in judo
- List of world champions in judo
- List of Canadian judoka
