= 谷 =

谷 is an East Asian character for a word or morpheme that means valley.

It may refer to:

- Gǔ (surname), common Chinese surname
- Tani (surname), common Japanese surname
- Radical 150 or radical valley, one of the Kangxi radicals
