= Ōtani =

Ōtani, Otani or Ohtani may refer to:

- Ōtani (surname), a Japanese surname
- Ōtani University, a private Buddhist university in Kita-ku, Kyoto, Japan
- Ōtani-ha, a branch of the Jōdo Shinshū school of Pure Land Buddhism
- The House of Ōtani, family of the descendants of Shinran, founder of Jōdo Shinshū

== See also ==
- New Otani Art Museum
