= Ōtani (surname) =

Ōtani (大谷), also romanized as Otani, Ootani or Ohtani, is a Japanese surname meaning "large canyon". Notable people with the surname include:

- Mamiko Ohtani (born 1996), Japanese basketball player
- Shohei Ohtani (大谷 翔平; born 1994), Japanese baseball player
- Decoy Ohtani, Shohei Ohtani's dog
- Masutaro Otani (大谷 増太郎,1896–1977), Japanese judo master
- Robin Otani (大谷 ロビン, born 1944), British/Japanese judo teacher, son of Masutaro Otani
- Tomio Otani (大谷 富雄, 1939–1991), British/Japanese kendo master and swordsman, son of Masutaro Otani
- Hayato Otani (大谷 駿斗; born 1997), Japanese footballer
- Momoko Ohtani (大谷 桃子; born 1995), Japanese wheelchair tennis player
- Tomohisa Otani (大谷 智久; born 1985), Japanese baseball player and coach
- Ikue Ōtani (大谷 育江; born 1965), Japanese voice actress
- Otani Kikuzo (大谷 喜久蔵; 1856–1923), Japanese general
- Kow Otani (大谷 幸; born 1957), Japanese composer
- Ōtani Kōzui (大谷 光瑞; 1876–1948), Japanese Buddhist monk and explorer
- Miho Otani (大谷 三穂; born 1971), Japanese military officer
- Sachiko Otani (大谷 佐知子; born 1965), Japanese volleyball player
- Sachio Otani (大谷 幸夫; 1924–2013), Japanese architect
- Shinjiro Otani (大谷 晋二郎; born 1972), Japanese professional wrestler
- Tomoya Ohtani (大谷 智哉; born 1974), Japanese composer
- Yoshiko Ohtani (1918–2000), Japanese religious leader
- Ōtani Yoshitsugu (大谷 吉継; 1558–1600), Japanese samurai and daimyō

== See also ==
- Tani (surname)
