= Busen =

Busen may refer to:

- Budo Senmon Gakko, a martial arts school in Japan
- Busen Point, a headland of South Georgia
- Johann Büsen (born 1984), German visual artist
- Karlheinz Busen (born 1951), German politician
