= De la Hoz =

de la Hoz is a common surname in the Spanish language, meaning "of the sickle".

- Juan Claudio de la Hoz y Mota (1630?–1710?), Spanish dramatist
- Marianela De La Hoz (born 1956), Mexican painter
- Mike de la Hoz (born 1938), Cuban baseball player
- Pedro Sánchez de la Hoz (1514–1547), Spanish conquistador
