= Radical 150 =

Chinese character radical

谷
- Radical 150 (U+2F95)
- 谷 (U+8C37) "valley"

Pronunciations
- Pinyin: gǔ
- Bopomofo: ㄍㄨˇ
- Wade–Giles: ku3
- Cantonese Yale: guk1
- Jyutping: guk1, juk6
- Japanese Kana: コク koku (on'yomi) たに tani (kun'yomi)
- Sino-Korean: 곡 gok

Names
- Japanese name(s): 谷/たに tani
- Hangul: 골 gol

Stroke order animation

Radical 150 or radical valley (谷部) meaning "valley" is one of the 20 Kangxi radicals (214 radicals in total) composed of 7 strokes.

In the Kangxi Dictionary, there are 54 characters (out of 49,030) to be found under this radical.

谷 is also the 162nd indexing component in the Table of Indexing Chinese Character Components predominantly adopted by Simplified Chinese dictionaries published in mainland China.

The character 谷 is also used as a Chinese surname, and also as a Japanese one.

In Simplified Chinese, 谷 is used as the simplified form of 穀 (grain).

== Evolution ==
Oracle bone script character

Bronze script character

Large seal script character

Small seal script character

== Derived characters ==
Strokes	Characters
+0	谷
+3	谸
+4	谹 谺 谻
+6	谼
+7	谽
+8	谾
+10	谿 (=溪 -> 水) 豀 (=溪 -> 水) 豁
+11	豂
+12	豃
+15	豄
+16	豅

== Sinogram ==
The radical is also used as an independent Chinese character. It is one of the Kyōiku kanji or Kanji taught in elementary school in Japan. It is a second grade kanji.

== Literature ==
- Fazzioli, Edoardo (1987). Chinese calligraphy : from pictograph to ideogram : the history of 214 essential Chinese/Japanese characters. calligraphy by Rebecca Hon Ko. New York: Abbeville Press. ISBN 0-89659-774-1.
- Lunde, Ken (Jan 5, 2009). "Appendix J: Japanese Character Sets" (PDF). CJKV Information Processing: Chinese, Japanese, Korean & Vietnamese Computing (Second ed.). Sebastopol, Calif.: O'Reilly Media. ISBN 978-0-596-51447-1.
