= Kyūshindō =

Judo philosophy

Kyūshindō is a philosophy developed by budō master Kenshiro Abbe in the mid-20th century and which became his central statement for his personal approach to Judo.

== Meaning ==
Several interpretations of the Japanese term kyū shin dō have been proposed. Tomio Otani, a long-term student of Abbe, translated it thus:

- kyū: Sphere or Circle
- shin: Heart or Nexus point
- dō: Way

At its most basic level, kyushindo can be equated with centripetal force. Tomio Otani defined it as "the accumulation of effort in a steady motion about the radius and centre of gravity". Abbe had discovered the efficiency of using centripetal force to throw much larger opponents while a student at Dai Nippon Butoku Kai in the 1930s, and it is likely that this discovery led to his further development of kyushindo as a philosophy.

As well as 'Sphere'/'Circle', Kyu can also mean 'Desire', 'Yearn', 'Search' or 'Study'. Likewise, Shin can also mean 'Spirit' or 'Truth'. This ambiguity allows kyushindo to be interpreted on a number of levels, and it can also have the meaning of The Seeker's Way to the Essence of Things, or the Truth.

== Philosophy ==
Kyushindo was the central statement for Abbe's personal approach to martial arts. He felt that there were three fundamental principles within Kyushindo which should be reflected in the Martial arts and in his outside life.

- All things in the Universe are in a constant state of motion (Banbutsu Ruten).
- This motion is rhythmic and flowing (Ritsu Do).
- All things work and flow in perfect harmony (Chowa).

Because of Abbe's association with Budo, Kyushindo has often been associated with martial arts. However, martial arts represent only one application of Kyushindo. The principles of Kyushindo may also be applied in other fields of study and practice, where they are interpreted according to the characteristics of each discipline.

The principle may be likened to the hub of a wheel from which an infinite number of spokes or forms radiate. The task of perfecting an art by the laborious process of studying each 'form' is doomed to failure because the possible variations are endless. By discovering the central principle it can then be applied in any direction at will.

Kyushindo states that the accumulation of efforts is a steady motion about the radius and center of gravity and that all things resign to this basic cyclic pattern. The normal perception and focus of awareness in the human being, flies along the outer periphery of existence, events flash past too rapidly for the mind to grasp. By re-discovering the original center of things, events turn more slowly in perception and the general scheme is more easily viewed.
