= Masutaro Otani Society of Judo =

Judo Organisation

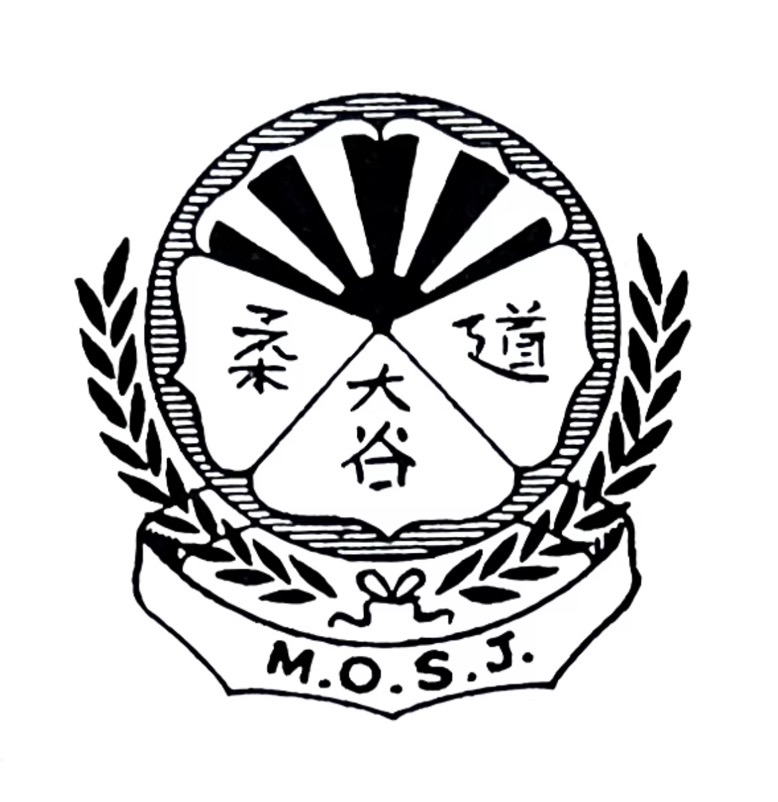
- Sport: Judo
- Abbreviation: MOSJ
- Founded: 1954
- President: Masutaro Otani
- Closure date: 1970

The Masutaro Otani Society of Judo (MOSJ), was a precursor organisation of the British Judo Council.

== History ==
The MOSJ was founded in 1954 by students of Masutaro Otani who preferred to learn the more traditional Japanese style of judo that Otani was teaching. The MOSJ was one of the three primary judo societies in 1960s Britain

Prior to forming the MOSJ, Otani ran a club known as the Jubilee Judo Club in Harlesden which was inducted into the British Judo Association. However he and his students were unhappy with the direction of judo in Britain. Otani left the British Judo Association and, with his students founded an organisation with the goal of preserving and protecting the traditional form of judo established by Professor Jigoro Kano. They named this organisation the Masutaro Otani Society of Judo and Otani was appointed as the master. The MOSJ would oversee a variety of judo clubs and occasionally took part in Acton Carnival's parade. They also held an annual tournament in London.

In 1955 Kenshiro Abbe arrived in Britain and reached out to Otani to assist him in creating his own organisation, which he named the 'British Judo Council'. Once it was formed, Abbe became the president and Otani became the master of the new organisation. Students would practise both with the society and with Abbe's British Judo Council and gradually the two organisations worked parallel and held grading tournaments together. They awarded the Otani shield prize. The MOSJ had over 8000 members and in 1969, when Abbe returned to Japan, Otani became president of both organisations, before amalgamating them in 1970 - creating the modern day British Judo Council, which he ran as president. Masutaro Otani served as president until his death in 1977. After his death, the presidency was taken over by his son, Robin Otani, who continues to serve as president. The British Judo Council was affiliated to the British Judo Association in 1994.
