= George Lambourn =

English painter (1900-1977)

- Born: 18 July 1900; Rotherhithe, London
- Died: 1977 (aged 76–77)
- Known for: Painting

George Lambourn (18 July 1900 – 1977) was a British artist, who although born in London, lived in Cornwall for most of his life.

== Biography ==
Lambourn was born in Rotherhithe in London and in 1916 joined the Royal Naval Air Service with whom he trained as an observer, while attached to a squadron based in Scotland during World War I.

After the war he worked in Bruges where he planned the design of a factory for the English Electric Light Bulb Company. While in Bruges he developed his interest in art and painting. This led Lambourn to study art at Goldsmiths and at the Royal Academy Schools between 1921 and 1926, and then briefly in Paris. In 1926 he married and moved to Sussex. Eventually he and his wife and their two children settled in Brooke near Norwich. There, Lambourn began painting portraits, most notably one of Augustus John which he completed in 1932. In 1936, Lambourn first visited Mousehole near Penzance. Soon afterwards he bought a former school which he made into his studio when he settled in Cornwall in 1938. Lambourn was a keen sportsman and was one of the first judo black belts in Britain and was chosen for the British Olympic kayak team in 1936. In 1938, Lambourn held his first solo exhibition at the Matthiessen Gallery. Among the works exhibited at that exhibition was Portrait of a Communist, which is possibly Lambourn's best known work and is now in the collection of the Tate.

At the start of World War Two, Lambourn joined the Red Cross and went to France, working in an ambulance unit as part of the British Expeditionary Force, in early 1940. Lambourn was subsequently assigned to a Field Dressing Station for the holding force covering the retreat from Calais. He was severely wounded and evacuated on one of the last boats to take part in the Dunkirk evacuation and was subsequently mentioned in dispatches. In July 1940, Lambourn joined the British Volunteer Ambulance Corps and commanded a section. When his service with the Ambulance Corps ended, he painted a number of works at the Hawksley aircraft factory in Gloucester. These works included Test Pilots, a large composition which depicted numerous individuals. He also decorated the canteen at the factory and this led to a commission to join the newly formed Army Decorating Service to decorate canteens and rest centres for the Eighth Army. Often using prisoners of war as well as British troops as his labour force, Lambourn decorated canteens and other facilities as the Allies advanced through North Africa, Italy and then into Austria. While in Italy in 1944, he briefly crossed paths with Spike Milligan, then a soldier recovering from shell shock. During the advance, Lambourn made several paintings of the refugees he encountered and a small number of these works were purchased by the War Artists' Advisory Committee.

After the war, Lambourn returned to Mousehole, where he ran the Merlin Theatre, from the school building he had bought before the war, until 1951. A solo show of his work, supported by the Arts Council, was held at the City Art Gallery in Plymouth in 1950. Following a bad experience with a Cork Street gallery, Lambourn mostly showed at small regional galleries with his last show being at the Newlyn Art Gallery in 1976. A memorial exhibition for Lambourn was held at the Gordon Hepworth Gallery in Exeter in 1991.

His painting of Yukio Tani, in the ownership of The Budokai, was restored by Lucia Scalisi during an August 2018 episode of the BBC Television programme The Repair Shop.
