= Oss (greeting) =

Japanese martial art greeting

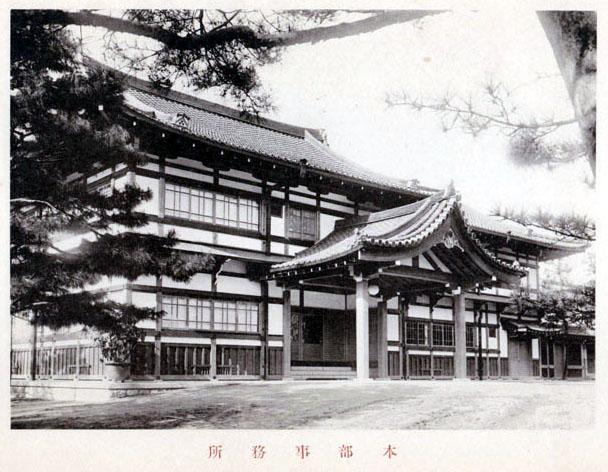
"Oss!" may have originated at the Budo Senmon Gakko in Kyoto

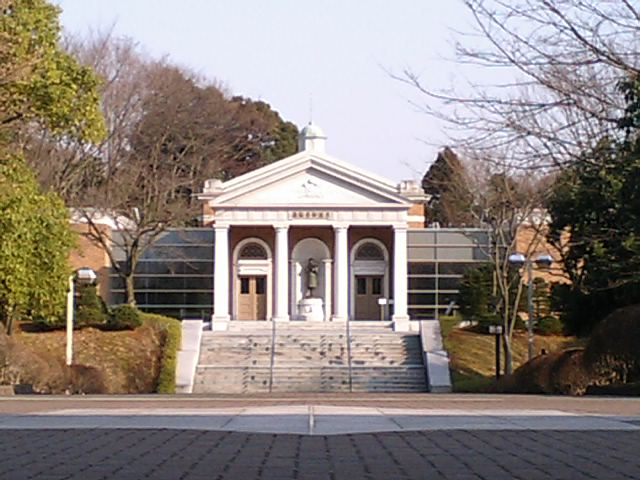
"Oss!" may have originated at Takushoku University in Tokyo

Oss also Osu (Japanese: おす or おっす) is a casual greeting in Japanese typically associated with male practitioners of Japanese martial arts such as karate, kendo, and judo.

"Oss!" is used outside Japan by some practitioners of Japanese martial arts and derived systems, including karate and Brazilian jiu-jitsu.

There are various theories as to its origin. The term may have originated before WWII in the Imperial Japanese Navy, at the Kyoto Budo Senmon Gakko of the Dai Nippon Butoku Kai, or the sumo club at Takushoku University. It is a rough contraction of ohayō gozaimasu (おはようございます). In addition to use as a greeting, oss! can also function as "yessir!" when a subordinate is brusquely questioned by a teacher, superior officer, or senpai.

"Oss" can be written in kanji as 押忍 but these are ateji applied after the term became common.
