= British Judo Council =

Judo Council

- Sport: Judo
- Abbreviation: BJC
- Founded: 1958
- Affiliation: British Judo Association
- President: Robin Otani

Official website
- britishjudocouncil.org
- (United Kingdom)

The British Judo Council (BJC) is a membership organisation and a governing body for judo in the United Kingdom.

== History ==
The British Judo council, was founded by Masutaro Otani and Kenshiro Abbe, following the amalgamation of their two preceding organisations which were amalgamated in 1970 to create the modern day British Judo Council, although its origins can be traced as far back as 1954. Otani arrived in the United Kingdom in 1919 and Abbe in 1955. Otani was an early pioneer of judo in Great Britain and member and instructor at the Budokwai, where he was the leading student of Yukio Tani. He also ran a judo club called the Jubilee Judo Club and accumulated a large following. In 1954 his students founded an organisation on his behalf named the Masutaro Otani Society of Judo or MOSJ.

In 1955 Kenshiro Abbe, then a 7th-dan Japanese judoka and the highest-ranked judoka outside Japan, was invited to Britain on a two-year contract to teach Judo at the London Judo Society (LJS), a judo school in South London. Abbe parted ways with the LJS in the following year, and started his own school for judo. Abbe reached out to Otani and the two formed a strong partnership. In 1958, Abbe formed a 'British Judo Council', assisted by William (Bill) Wood his senior student, then a 3rd dan as well as with help from Otani. The MOSJ had a large membership, and the Membership of Abbe's BJC expanded rapidly into the early 1960s. Students from the MOSJ and Abbe's BJC would begin training at both organisations and in 1969 Abbe returned to Japan and Otani became president of both organisations, before amalgamating them in 1970 to create the modern day British Judo Council, of which he ran as president. Masutaro Otani served as president until his death in 1977, the presidency was then taken over by his son, Robin Otani, who continues to serve as president to this day. The BJC was affiliated to the British Judo Association (BJA) in 1994.

== Philosophy ==
The BJC have a more traditional outlook towards judo than is generally the case in Britain. The traditional white judogi is preferred over the blue judogi that was introduced for international competition. Etiquette is more rigidly adhered to than is often the case in more sport-oriented clubs and organisations. The BJC stress the importance of kata, a view that for some time was not shared by some other large organisational bodies in the UK, but which changed with the introduction of kata tournaments. The BJC also have their own kata standards.

‘BJC Judo’ is described by Robin Otani, Akinori Hosaka & B. Richmond as a concept of, pure, clean, judo with Jigoro Kano's principle of minimum effort and maximum efficiency. ‘BJC Judo’ gives everyone an opportunity of aspiring to achieve ones highest and full potential in life.

== See also ==
- Judo in the United Kingdom

== Bibliography ==
- Otani, Robin (2007), What is Judo? The BJC Perspective (PDF), archived from the original (PDF) on July 25, 2011
- Fromm, Alan; Soames, Nicolas (1982), Judo - The Gentle Way, London: RKP
- Hammond, Dave, Ippon! The fight for Judo's soul., London: London League Publications Ltd.
