= Hoz =

Hoz or HOZ may refer to:

== People ==
- De la Hoz, a Spanish surname
- Dov Hoz (1894–1940), Russian Jewish Zionist
- Shmaryahu Hoz (born 1945), Israeli chemist

== Places ==
- Hoz y Costean, Huesca, Aragon, Spain
- Hoz de Jaca, Huesca, Aragon, Spain
- La Hoz de la Vieja, Teruel, Aragon, Spain

== Other uses ==
- Hozo language, spoken in Ethiopia
- Howwood railway station, in Scotland
