= Open Source Shakespeare =

Free site featuring the complete works of Shakespeare

The "Bard of Avon," William Shakespeare (1564–1616)

Open Source Shakespeare is a non-commercial web site allowing free access to searchable digital versions of the complete works of William Shakespeare. The site was created using Moby Shakespeare, which is based on the 1864 Globe edition of the complete works.

== History ==
The idea of a free online resource compiling Shakespeare's works was conceived in 2001 by Eric M. Johnson, then working as a web designer and theater reviewer for the Washington Times newspaper while pursuing a Master's degree at George Mason University. In the process of looking up the source of Shakespearian quotes online, Johnson was surprised to learn that no single web resource allowed users to freely access a comprehensive collection of William Shakespeare's writings.

"The ones that were comprehensive were not free, and the free ones were not comprehensive" Johnson recalled.

Johnson started to create just such a free and comprehensive digital collection as part of his graduate program, unveiled as the Open Source Shakespeare website in December 2003. The site was formally announced to the scholarly community in February 2004.

According to the site's founder, about 77,000 people made use of the resource in 2005, with a further 170,000 anticipated to visit the site in 2006. The operating costs of the site were minimal; through 2006, these were paid out of pocket by the site's creator. Subsequently, a grant application was made to the National Endowment for the Humanities by Johnson and three members of the English Department of George Mason University to provide funding for the project.

== Site structure ==
Shakespeare's works are divided on the site into three genres: plays, sonnets, and poems. The site also includes a concordance, search engine, and information about basic usage statistics.

The site has gained functionality over time, with a "Version 2.0" released in 2005 which added the capability for users to search for word stems or phonetically and to save and print search results.

In the middle of 2009 a site version designed for portable devices was unveiled, called Mobile Open Source Shakespeare.
