= Oss (surname) =

Oss is a surname. Notable people with the surname include:

- Albert Oss (1818–1898), Union Army soldier
- Arnold Oss (1928–2024), American ice hockey player
- Daniel Oss (born 1987), Italian cyclist

== See also ==
- Ost (surname)
