= Otto Stern School for Integrated Doctoral Education =

Platform for doctoral education in natural sciences

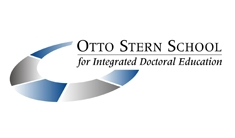
- Established: 2006
- Location: Frankfurt am Main, Germany
- Website: www.oss.uni-frankfurt.de

The Otto Stern School (OSS) is the platform for doctoral education in natural sciences at the Johann Wolfgang Goethe University Frankfurt am Main.

== Organisation ==
The Otto Stern School was founded in 2006 as a scientific centre of the Goethe University. It offers support and sponsorship for its members. Doctoral candidates and their supervising teams (professors and, as second or third supervisor, postdocs) can become members if they belong to one of the natural sciences faculties or PhD programmes and Collaborate Research Centres of the Goethe University, e.g.: International Helmholtz Graduate School

- Frankfurt International School of Science (FIGSS)
- DFG Priority Programme Genom organisation and Genom expression in Archaea
- Collaborative Research Center Functional Membrane Proteomics
- International Max Planck Research School for Structure and Function of Biological Membrane
- Research Training Group Neuronal Plasticity
- Research unit RIFT Dynamics
- Research unit Spin and Charge correlations in low-dimensional metallorganic solid state
- Research unit Ecological and Cultural Change in West and Central Africa

Institutions of the Otto Stern School are the Council, consisting of representatives of the respective faculties, PhD programmes, supervisors and doctoral candidates, the Directorate, the Quality-Assurance Board, the Admission Committees, the Chairperson, the Management and the Ombudsperson.

== Responsibilities ==
- To support the doctoral education in natural sciences at the Goethe University and thus current and future research.
- To introduce international standards and a common structure in doctoral education for an even higher professional approach.
- To ensure the quality of doctoral education.
- To prepare doctoral candidates and young scientists for challenges in research and economy - during the dissertation phase and beyond.
- To accompany international candidates through their first weeks in Germany.

This is accomplished by three main offers: A Target Agreement is concluded between doctoral candidates, supervisors and the OSS, which limits the dissertation project to 3-3.5 years and arranges regular meetings of the candidate and the supervising team. Furthermore, the OSS offers workshops for doctoral candidates and, if desired, supervisors to convey key skills in research (e.g. scientific presentation), organisation (e.g. time management and communication strategies) and career planning (e.g. application training). English and German language courses are also part of this programme. Also funding options like travel grants, start-up scholarships and child-care subsidies are awarded to foster international and interdisciplinary research in the natural sciences of the Goethe University.

== Admission Requirements ==
- Admission as doctoral candidates by one of the natural sciences faculties of the Goethe University
- Master's degree or equivalent with an average above the German “gut” (2.5)
- English Skills at Level B2
- For Non-Native Speakers: German Skills at Level A1
- Joint Supervision: at least 2 supervisors, one of which must be a member of a faculty
