= Yukio Tani =

Japanese judoka

- 谷 幸雄
- Tani (right) demonstrating a flying armbar on William Bankier, c. 1906
- Born: 1881; Japan
- Died: January 22, 1950 (aged 69); London, England
- Occupation(s): Japanese martial arts instructor, professional challenge wrestler
- Organization: Tenjin Shinyo-ruy, Bartitsu Academy, The Japanese School of Ju-Jitsu,The Budokwai
- Height: 5 ft 3 in (160 cm)

Yukio Tani (谷 幸雄, Tani Yukio, 1881 – 24 January 1950) was a pioneering Japanese jujutsu and judo instructor and professional challenge wrestler, notable for being one of the first jujutsu stylists to teach and compete outside of Japan.

== Biography ==
Tani's early jujutsu training in Japan were heavily tied to his father, who was a master of Tenjin-Shinyo-ryu, but he is also rumored to have studied with Mataemon Tanabe, as Yukio's father and grandfather were friends with the Fusen-ryu master. There is also some evidence he trained in Yataro Handa's jujutsu school called the Seibukan in Osaka. In 1900, the nineteen-year old Yukio, his brother Kaneo and a fellow jujutsuka Seizo Yamamoto travelled to London by invitation of Edward William Barton-Wright, the founder of Bartitsu. His brother and Yamamoto soon returned to Japan, but Yukio stayed in London and began appearing at music halls, giving demonstrations of jujutsu and placing challenges to all comers. Tani and Uyenishi were also employed as jujutsu instructors at Barton Wright's "Bartitsu School of Arms and Physical Culture" at 67b Shaftesbury Avenue in London's Soho district.

After breaking with Barton-Wright in 1902, Tani joined forces with veteran show business promoter William Bankier, who had himself been a music hall performer under the name "Apollo, the Scottish Hercules" and had met Yukio in his tenure with Barton. Under Bankier's management, Tani became a professional wrestler on the music hall circuit, where he would challenge anyone willing to test his skill. With the temptation of winning £1 for lasting each minute, for a bout of up to 5 minutes, or £5 to £100 for winning, there was never a shortage of challengers. On stage Tani was known as the "pocket Hercules" and was famous throughout all levels of London society. At 5 feet 6 inches (1.68 metres) Tani allegedly lost only one music hall match and that was to a fellow Japanese national, Taro Miyake, in 1905. (Note: One contemporary newspaper report places Tani's loss to Miyake in December 1904.) During one week at the Oxford Music Hall, Yukio Tani met and defeated thirty-three men, some of whom were well known continental wrestlers. In one six-month tour Tani defeated an average of 20 men a week, a total of over 500 challengers over the period of the tour.

The rules of the challenge matches required Tani's opponents to wrestle according to competitive jujutsu rules, which meant that they had to avoid being forced to submit within a defined period of time. As the concept and practise of submission wrestling was foreign to most non-British European wrestlers during this period, this did offer Tani a tactical advantage in his challenge matches. Along with this, during the 1920s, "when...little Tani was taking on all comers in the music halls of Britain, he allowed his challengers to use any technique that they wanted, insisting only that they wear a jacket. This gave him the one big advantage that he needed over all the wrestlers and boxers who were invariably larger than he was".

However, against practitioners of jacket styles he was not always successful. For example, in 1926, at Exeter, Fred Richards, who had recently lost the Cornish wrestling heavyweight title, claimed the forfeit after lasting 15 minutes, despite there being no ground game in Cornish wrestling. Appollo, Tani's manager, claimed this was the first time in Tani's career that he had to pay the forfeit. He was similarly unsuccessful against J Brewer (the 1924 featherweight Cornish wrestling champion) in 1927. After fighting with other Cornish wrestlers, such as George Bazeley and Francis Gregory, Tani took lessons in Cornish wrestling. Tani wrote about his teachers, in an open letter to the Western Morning News, "They are not a Richards or a Bazeley, but they are kind and teach me what is right and what is wrong and from that I shall be able to develop my own plans, so that when I come to Cornwall I shall have a little knowledge and confidence, and shall endeavour to do my best." Tani subsequently competed in Cornish wrestling tournaments in the late 1920s with some success, but only at an amateur level.

In 1904, Tani and Miyake opened the Japanese School of Jujutsu that was located at 305, Oxford Street W, London. This school was to remain open for a little over two years, one of his pupils being the stage actress Marie Studholme. Tani also partnered with Miyake in co-authoring a book, The Game of Ju-jitsu, which was first published in 1906.

Tani also became famous with his very public enmity with professional wrestling champion George Hackenschmidt. The Japanese first challenged him to a match, but he was ignored. For this reason, Tani and Bankier sought to draw his attention, and raided the stage after the match between Hackenschmidt and Antonio Pierri in 1903 in order to challenge Hackenschmidt again, this time personally and in front of a crowd. Hackenschmidt, knowing he was unfamiliar to jujutsu techniques, demanded a match under Greco-Roman wrestling rules, his own specialty, but the bout never came to fruition. Still, Hackenschmidt would later recommend aspirant wrestlers to learn jujutsu, as put in his 1909 book The Complete Science of Wrestling. Tani also challenged the famous Great Gama during the latter's visit to London in 1910, but he was ignored again.

In 1918, Tani became the first professional teacher at the London Budokwai, created by his countryman Gunji Koizumi initially teaching jiujitsu. During a visit to the Budokwai by Jigoro Kano, the founder of Kodokan judo, in 1920, Tani was awarded the second-degree black belt rank in judo. Eventually, Tani reached the rank of 4th-dan. Assisting Tani at the Budokwai was another pioneer of judo in Britain, his leading student Masutaro Otani who founded the MOSJ, which eventually evolved into the British Judo Council.

Tani suffered a stroke in 1937, but continued to teach from the sidelines of the Budokwai mats until his death in London on 24 January 1950, aged 69.

A painting of Tani by George Lambourn, in the ownership of the Budokwai, was restored by Lucia Scalisi during an August 2018 episode of the BBC Television programme The Repair Shop.

== Book ==
- The Game of Ju-Jitsu, for the Use of Schools and Colleges. Yukio Tani and Taro Miyake. 91 illustrations. Drawings by George Morrow. Edited by L. F. Giblin and M. A. Grainger. London: Hazell, Watson & Viney (for the Japanese School of Ju-jitsu), 1906.
