= Kyu-ha Kim =

South Korean judoka

- Born: February 24, 1935; Daejeon, Korea
- Died: May 14, 2021 (aged 86)
- Nickname: "The Tree"
- Nationality: Korean
- Style: Judo, Taekwondo
- Teachers: Kyu-tae Kim (1940), Han Sang-yul (1950), Jin Kyung-suk.

Other information
- Children: Eugene Kim, Mary Kim.
- Notable schools: Tae Jon High School (Korea); Yong-In University (Korea).

Kyu-ha Kim (February 24, 1935- May 14, 2021) was a South Korean judoka. He was the youngest judoka to get his kudan (9th degree black belt). He was posthumously promoted to, jūdan the 10th degree black belt. He also practiced in the Korean martial art, Taekwondo and attained the rank of 9th degree black belt. Prior to his death he taught martial arts for over sixty years. He established a school in Brentwood, PA and taught at the University of Pittsburgh. In June 2008, he became the oldest successful heart transplant recipient of the University of Pittsburgh Medical Center.

== Biography ==
Kyu-ha Kim was born near the city of Daejeon in a rural province, which is approximately 100 miles south of Seoul, South Korea. He came from a family of peasants that grew vegetables, fruits, and raised livestock on their farm.

=== Learning Judo ===
At the age of five, Kim began to practice judo and was first trained by his half-brother Kyu-tae Kim. He attended the Tae Jon High School, where he intensively studied martial arts, training under Han Sang-yul. Kim was promoted 1st dan (1st degree black belt). After graduating from high school, he attended the Korean Yudo College, now known as Yong-In University from 1954 to 1958 (which is specialized in martial arts) in order to become a judo teacher. In 1958, he won the individual and team Korean National Judo Championship, and he was promoted to 5th dan (5th degree black belt) at Yong-In University for his achievements in the national championship.

=== His family ===
Kim had a daughter, Mary, and a son, Eugene. His children follow in his passion for martial arts. Eugene is now a sixth-degree black belt in both judo and taekwondo and a talented martial arts instructor. Like his father, he has won many national tournaments and was his successor as president of the Pennsylvania state Judo organization. Eugene's two children, Tyler and Tanner, are both black belts in judo and taekwondo. His daughter Mary manages a fitness studio in Boston. She has three children.

== Death ==
Grandmaster Kyu-ha Kim passed away the morning of May 14, 2021 of old age. He was 86. The USJA promoted Kyu-ha Kim to Judan - 10th Degree Black Belt, May 17, 2021.

== Teaching career ==
After graduating from Yong-In, the university contacted him in 1959 to teach judo. At the same time, Kim was also contacted by the Korean Air Force for the same purpose, which makes him the first judoka to become an instructor at the Korea Military Academy. It was also in the Korea Military Academy that he was called "The Tree" for the first time, by his students, because they considered that it was impossible to take him to the ground during judo's sparring (randori). He also began practicing Taekwondo in 1959 with the help of Kyung-won Lee, assistant of Hwang Kee. Kim met Jon Bluming (December,1959) for a randori Jon Bluming threw Kim to the ground once, surprising him with a left side throw, then declared: "[The first throw] was the last thing that was easy about Kim for after that he completely vacuum-cleaned the mat with me, which convinced me that, yes, this was the Korean champ." In 1960, he won for the second time the individual and team Korean judo championship. He was invited to visit the United States in 1961, by a company including martial arts giants such as Daeshik Kim, Chan-yong Kim and Jhoon Rhee.

=== Teaching in the United States ===
Kim was one of the first Korean martial arts masters to leave South Korea to spread their arts to the world. In 1961, he visited the United States. After a brief stay in New York City, Kim spent a year in Oklahoma City before permanently settling in Pittsburgh (Pennsylvania) where he started teaching martial arts at The Pittsburgh Judo School. After that he taught at the Young Men’s Hebrew Association (YMHA). It was during this time period that one of his most notable students, Gary Goltz, began his lifelong study of judo. Kim also started to teach Judo at the Pittsburgh Athletic Association (PAA). In 1967, Kim opened Kim’s Judo School in the South Hills Area of Pittsburgh. In 1972, Kim became the judo instructor at the University of Pittsburgh after being introduced to the Dean of their Athletic Department by his student Gary Goltz. He was also coach for the US team at the Pan-Am games in 1976 and 1977. He was inducted into the US Judo Instructors Hall of Fame in 1994 by the USJF (United States Judo Federation). Moreover, Kim has played a central role in developing Judo and Taekwondo in Pennsylvania and on the East coast. Nowadays, a large annual judo tournament takes place in Pennsylvania which bears his name.

== Cardiac illness ==
Early in 2007, Kim's health started to deteriorate due to a degenerative heart condition. As his condition worsened, he needed an implant of a pacemaker. This surgery started to become problematic as Kim had many staph infections which forced him to stay in hospital for prolonged periods. In fact, he developed idiopathic cardiomyopathy caused by a virus. By July 2007, as his heart continued to deteriorate his doctors recommended a heart transplant procedure. Despite his fitness, his illness and his 73 years of age meant that the diagnosis could not guarantee the safety of the operation.

First, Kim was very skeptical of the idea on getting a heart transplant, however his lifelong student Gary Goltz (who was both a senior healthcare industry executive and past President of the United States Judo Association) eventually convinced him, arguing that the influence Kim had on him growing up was too important to deprive others of its benefit particularly his grandsons for him to give up. As a result, he decided to get on the waiting list for heart transplants.

Of the twelve hundred procedures performed at University of Pittsburgh Medical Center since 1980, only fifteen to twenty fell into this category. Although many heart transplant recipients must wait several months, even years for a donor heart, after only two weeks on the heart transplant waiting list, a donor heart became available. Although the donor heart was less than perfect as it exhibited signs of a cardiovascular disease, Kim chose, in his words, "to take a chance.”

=== Heart transplant surgery ===
On June 28, 2008, the surgery started on Saturday morning and took more time than normally as the operation lead to a bleeding problem. After a surgery of ten hours, Kim was alert and had an appetite the following evening. Despite a pessimistic prognosis, Kim and his family and his students did not give in and finally made it to the University of Pittsburgh Medical Center and a team of surgeons agreed to lead the transplant after a final battery of tests, the medical staff declared that given his good physical condition he was a healthy enough candidate for the transplant. Dr. Bermudez, who led the team, claimed that only a few patients with such condition could withstand the operation.

=== Surgery results ===
According to Dr. Bermudez, the physical condition of Kim was the reason of the success of his surgery. People close to him claimed that there was no doubt about the reason of his recovery which was his spirit. But this operation involved following a strict alimentation for his physical rehabilitation and a medical attention. To be sure his body did not reject the organ he underwent a biopsy of heart tissue a few times a month. To help him, Ursula Reis, who became his second wife, kept track of the appointments, medication and myriad procedures. Five years after his surgery, Kim continued to teach Martial arts at his own club and the University of Pittsburgh.

== The renovation of his dojo ==
During his absence, touched by the illness of their instructor, more than fifty of his students at Kim's Martial Arts and Fitness studio in Brentwood decide to renovate his dojo. As a group effort, they wanted to do something for their teacher and purchased and installed new flooring and mats as well as a new computerized recording system. They also cleaned, painted, installed security and sound equipment. The students were happy to help in some way, giving their time or money. Kim represented more than a judo teacher to them, he inculcated them the character, the ethics and the morality of life. His dojo appears like a real family to him because he keeps in touch with his old students more than thirty years after taught them martial arts. After his surgery, he was grateful, but thought that the renovation was not necessary to practice Judo.

== Prize list ==
In 1955 and 1960, Kim won the Korean National Judo championship both as an individual and team. He left Yong-In University with a black belt fifth degree while students usually got out of this university with a black belt fourth degree.
