= Naoki Murata =

Japanese judoka (1949-2020)

- Born: 21 July 1949; Tokorozawa, Saitama, Japan
- Died: 9 April 2020 (aged 70)
- Rank: 8th Dan in Kodokan judo

Other information
- University: Tokyo University of Education
- Notable school(s): Kodokan
- Website: www.kodokan.org
- Last updated on: 2020-04-14

Naoki Murata (村田 直樹, Murata Naoki, 21 July 1949 – 9 April 2020) was an 8th dan Japanese judoka and author. He has written many books about judo. He was also the curator of the Kodokan Judo Museum in Tokyo.

== Biography ==
Murata was born in Tokorozawa, Saitama in 1949. He studied at the Faculty of Physical Education, Department of Martial Arts of the Tokyo University of Education, where he obtained the MA degree in physical fitness in 1973. He has been a judo instructor in more than ten countries, including Iceland and Thailand. He also worked as an assistant professor at Kagawa University. He was a curator of the Kodokan Judo Museum and Library. In July 2008, he has been appointed the Head of Directors of the Japanese Academy of Budo, chairman of the All Japan Judo Federation's Committee of Education and Proliferation of Judo as well as a member of the federation's Referee Committee. In 2013 he was promoted to the rank of 8th dan in Kodokan judo. Murata died on 9 April 2020 at the age of 70.

== Bibliography ==
- Supotsu to shintai undo no kagakuteki tankyu (A Scientific Investigation of Sports and Physical Exercise), Bikosha
- Wa-ei taisho judo yogo kojiten (A Small Japanese-English Dictionary of Judo Vocabulary), Kodokan
- Wa-ei taisho judo - sono kokoro to kihon (Japanese-English Judo - Its Mind and Basics), Hon no Tomosha
- Gendai jūdōron: kokusaika jidai no jūdō o kangaeru (Modern Judo), Taishukan shoten, 1993 ISBN 4-469-26260-9
- Jūdō daijiten (Great Judo Dictionary), Atene shobo, 1999 ISBN 4-87152-205-9
- Budo o shiru (Knowing Budo), Fumaido Shuppan, 2000
- Judo no shiten (The Judo Point of View), Dowa shoten, 2000 ISBN 4-8105-1065-4
- Kanō Jigorō shihan ni manabu (Learning from Jigoro Kano), Nihon Budokan, 2001 ISBN 4-583-03635-3
- Mind over muscle: writings from the founder of Judo, Kodansha International, 2005 ISBN 4-7700-3015-0
- L'essence du judo (Essence of Judo), Noisy-sur-École, 2007 ISBN 978-2-84617-242-4
