= Tomio Otani =

English kendo master (1939–1991)

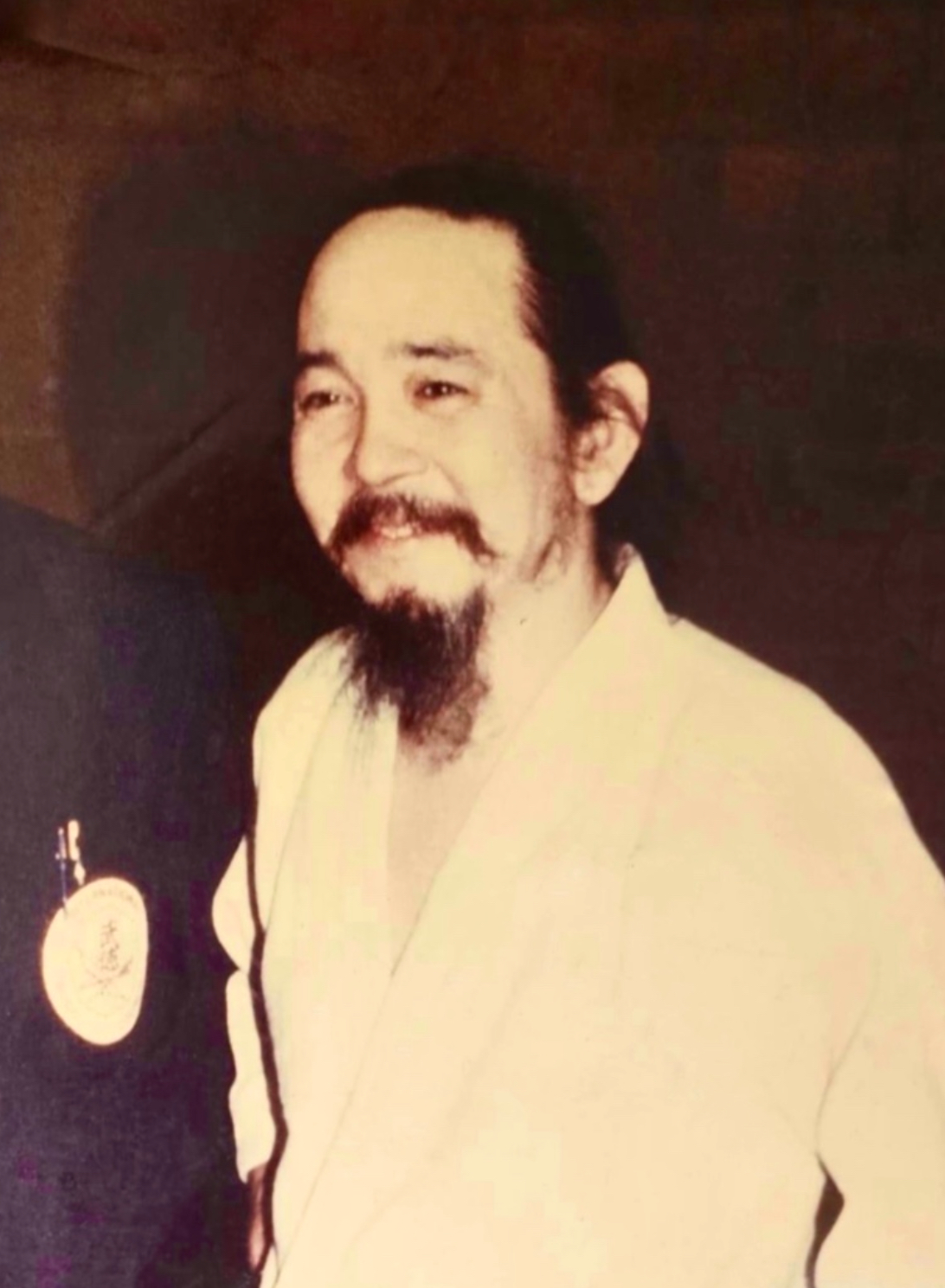
- Born: 8 September 1939; London, United Kingdom
- Died: 6 June 1990 (aged 50)
- Nationality: British Japanese
- Style: Kendo
- Teachers: Masutaro Otani and Kenshiro Abbe

Tomio Otani (8 September 1939 - 6 June 1991) was a British master swordsman, kendo master and the first national Coach to the British Kendo Council. He was one of the pioneers of kendo in Britain as the leading student of Kenshiro Abbe. Tomio was described as one of the world's top exponents of martial arts. He was a master of multiple other martial arts, including iaido, iaijutsu, aikido, kobudō and grew up learning judo and was also the founder of the Yodokan philosophy. Tomio Otani is the brother of Robin Otani and the son of Masutaro Otani.

== Biography ==
Tomio Otani was born in London in 1939 as the eldest son of judo master Masutaro Otani. Growing up, Tomio learnt judo from his father. At 15 Tomio began learning Kendo from Kenshiro Abbe and became his leading kendo student. Tomio was a follower of Abbe's Kyūshindō philosophy and founded his own Yodokan philosophy. Tomio Otani defined Kyūshindō as "the accumulation of effort in a steady motion about the radius and center of gravity." He then became a teacher of kendo, the bayonet arts and other budo to many students. He was also a master of aikido but never took a grading.

Tomio was awarded his 3rd Dan in 1969 and eventually reached 5th dan. Students said, regarding his kendo: "Tomio was so fast that when we had competition, he would hit you several times with the shinai while you were thinking about hitting him." At the beginning of 1990, Tomio's health started to deteriorate and he was diagnosed with stomach cancer. Tomio Otani died on 6 June 1991.
