= New Otani Art Museum =

Art museum in Tokyo (1991-2014)

Coordinates: 35.6791°N 139.7359°E

The New Otani Art Museum (ニューオータニ美術館, Nyū Ōtani Bijutsukan) was an art museum founded in 1991 and housed on the sixth floor of the Hotel New Otani Tokyo's Garden Court office building. The Hotel, located in Tokyo's Chiyoda Ward, opened in 1964 to coincide with the Tokyo Olympic Games.

The museum's collections consisted primarily of unique modern art from France and Japan, along with a considerable number of pieces of Japanese ukiyo-e art.

Yoneichi Otani, son of Hotel founder Yonetaro Otani, was the first director of the museum.

The museum was closed in March 2014.
