= Johann Büsen =

German artist (born 1984)

Johann Büsen (born 1984 in Paderborn) is a German visual artist.

== Life ==
Johann Büsen studied from 2005 to 2010 at the Bremen University of the Arts and got his diploma with Peter Bialobrzeski. Since 2003 he has participated in various group and solo exhibitions. He lives and works in Bremen.

== Work ==
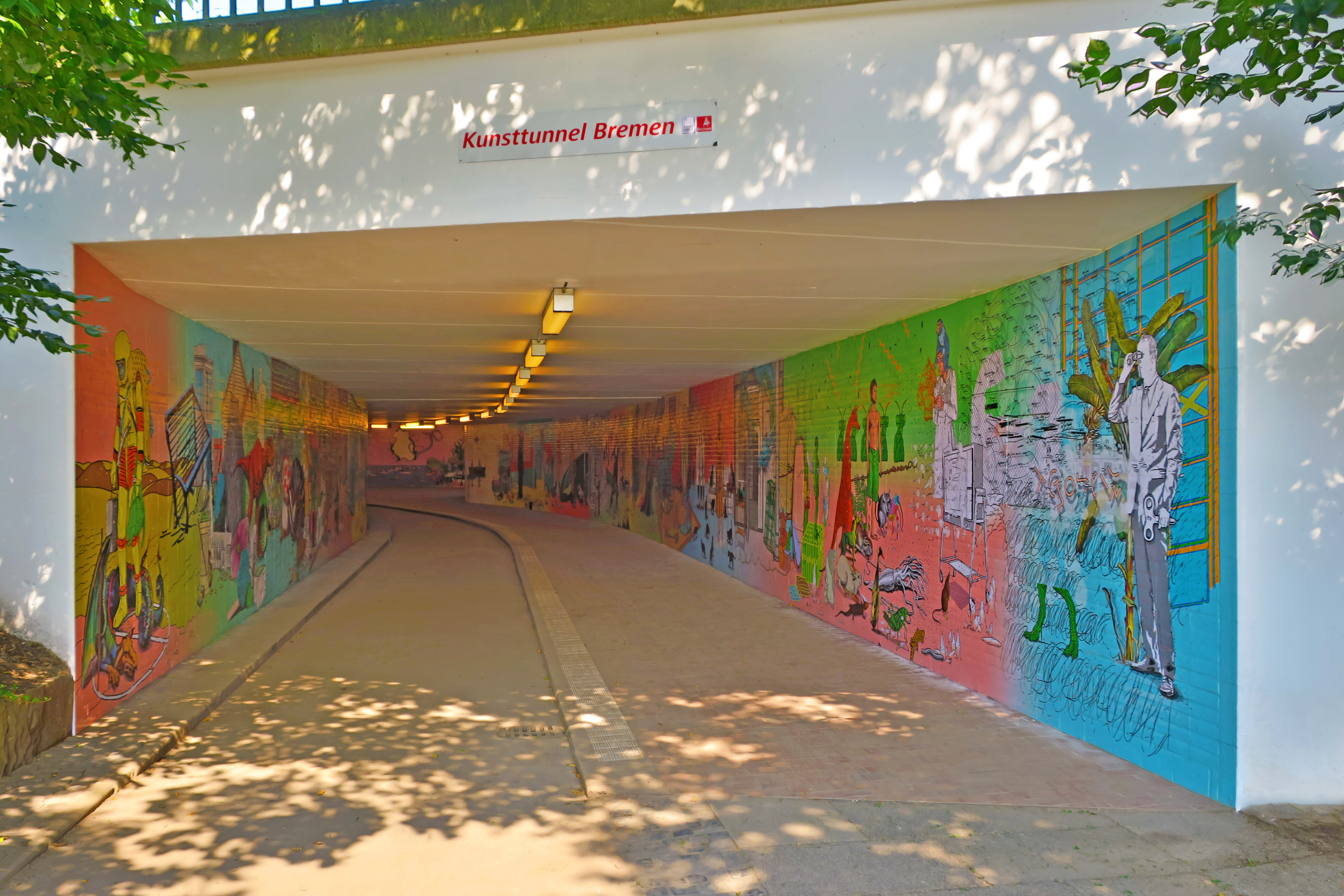
Kunsttunnel Bremen, 2,50 × 200 m

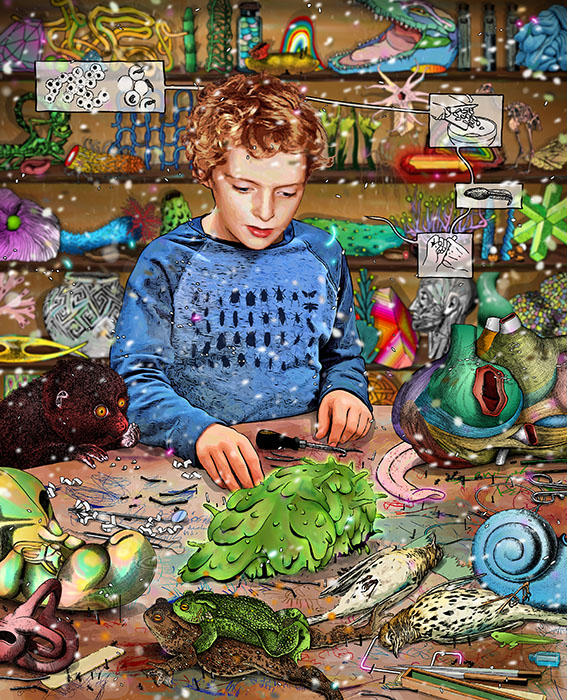
Exploration, 2016

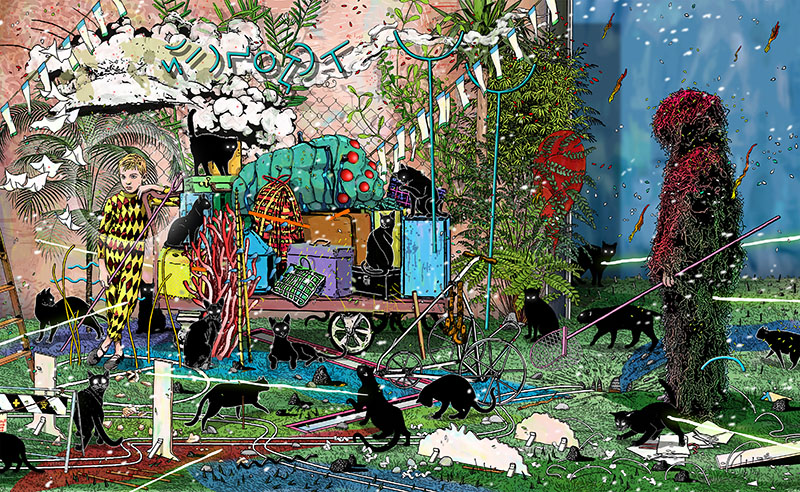
Catcher, 2016

Johann Büsen draws, photographs and takes motifs from various media - from conventional printed matter to images from the Internet. The edited elements are condensed into new, surreal stories. Digital painting is created on the computer using a graphics tablet and various programs.

In 2016 he won an invitation to tender from the Bremen Senator for Culture to redesign the Bremen Art Tunnel, a bicycle and pedestrian tunnel between Osterdeich and Wallanlagen (Bremen). He designed around 500 square meters here in public space from 200 sheets of paper sealed with clear lacquer. He created Bremen's longest work of art.

== Exhibitions (selection) ==
Solo exhibitions

- 2008: Interrupt, Galerie Des Westens, Bremen
- 2009: Pop-Up, Städtische Galerie im Königin-Christinen-Haus, Zeven
- 2011: Kurzurlaub, Galerie Mitte, Bremen
- 2012: Excursion, Galerie G.A.S.-Station, Berlin
- 2013: Coexistence, Evelyn Drewes Galerie, Hamburg
- 2013: Hide + Seek, NWWK Neuer Worpsweder Kunstverein, Worpswede
- 2014: In Between, Galerie Brennecke, Berlin
- 2014: Twisted Signs, Kunstförderverein, Weinheim
- 2016: Elsewhere, Kunstverein, Wedemark
- 2018: Secrets, Venet-Haus Galerie, Neu-Ulm
- 2019: Digitale Malerei, Lippische Gesellschaft für Kunst, Detmold

Group exhibitions

- 2005: Wer Visionen hat soll zum Arzt gehen, Gesellschaft für Aktuelle Kunst, Bremen
- 2006: 83. Herbstausstellung, Städtische Galerie KUBUS, Hannover
- 2009: 15 Positionen zeitgenössischer Kunst, Vorwerk – Zentrum für zeitgenössische Kunst, Syke
- 2011: 7. Kunstfrühling, Güterbahnhof, Bremen
- 2011: Krieg im Frieden, Kunstpavillon München
- 2012: Mediated Visions, Galerie Wedding, Berlin
- 2012: Salon Schwarzenberg, Galerie Neurotitan, Berlin
- 2013: Discover Me, Ostfriesisches Landesmuseum Emden
- 2014: 37. Bremer Förderpreis für Bildende Kunst, Städtische Galerie Bremen
- 2014: Videodox, Galerie der Künstler, München
- 2014: Urban Art - Wie die Street Art ins Museum kam, Schloss Agathenburg
- 2015: Weltraum, Rathausgalerie Kunsthalle, München
- 2015: Knotenpunkt, Affenfaust Galerie, Hamburg
- 2015: Salon Salder, Städtische Kunstsammlungen, Salzgitter
- 2016: Zwei Meter unter Null, Kunsthalle Wilhelmshaven
- 2018: Summer Breeze, 30works Galerie, Köln

== Awards ==
- 2007: 29. Internationaler Kunstpreis, Schloss Freienfels, Hollfeld
- 2010: Paula Modersohn-Becker Nachwuchs-Kunstpreis, Kunsthalle, Worpswede
- 2018: 10-monatiges Arbeitsstipendium, St. Stephani (Bremen)
