= Juan Claudio de la Hoz y Mota =

Spanish dramatist

Juan Claudio de la Hoz y Mota (c. 1630 – c. 1710) was a Spanish dramatist. He was born in Madrid, and became a Knight of Santiago in 1653, and soon afterwards succeeded his father as regidor of Burgos.

In 1665 he was nominated to an important post at the Treasury, and in his later years acted as official censor of the Madrid theatres. On 13 August 1709 he signed his play entitled José, salvador de Egipto, and is presumed to have died in the following year.

Hoz is not remarkable for originality of conception, but his recasts of plays by earlier writers are distinguished by an adroitness which accounts for the esteem in which he was held by his contemporaries. El Montañés Juan Pascual and El castigo de la miseria, reprinted in the Biblioteca de Autores Españoles, give a just idea of his adaptable talent.
