= Tani (surname) =

Tani (written: 谷 lit. "valley") is a Japanese surname. Notable people with the surname include:

- Atsuki Tani (谷 昌樹; born 1959), Japanese voice actor and actor
- Daniel M. Tani (born 1961), American astronaut
- Hayato Tani (谷 隼人; born 1946), Japanese actor
- Hisao Tani (谷 寿夫; 1882–1947), Japanese lieutenant general and a convicted war criminal
- Ikuko Tani (谷 育子; born 1939), Japanese actress and voice actress
- Kanon Tani (谷 花音; born 2004), Japanese child actress
- Kei Tani (谷啓; 1932–2010), Japanese comedian, actor and musician
- Kimuchi Tani (谷 公市; born 1948), Japanese sport wrestler
- Koichi Tani (谷 公一; born 1952), Japanese politician
- Marcellino Taiji Tani (1953–2026), Japanese Roman Catholic bishop
- Naomi Tani (谷ナオミ; born 1948), Japanese actress
- Marika Tani (谷 真理佳; born 1996), Japanese idol, a member of SKE48 and a former member of HKT48
- Ryoko Tani (谷 亮子; born 1975), Japanese judoka
- Tani Tateki (谷 干城; 1837–1911), Japanese general
- Yoshitomo Tani (谷 佳知; born 1973), Japanese baseball player
- Yukio Tani (谷 幸雄; 1881–1950), Japanese martial arts instructor and professional challenge wrestler in England

== Fictional characters ==
- Akiko Tani, a character in the manga series Detective Conan
- Chiaki Tani, a character in the Samurai Sentai Shinkenger
- Genjiro Tani, a character in the Kamen Rider (1979 TV series) & Kamen Rider Super-1

== See also ==
- Ōtani (surname)
