= Marianela de la Hoz =

Mexican artist

Marianela de la Hoz (born June 14, 1956) is a Mexican painter who depicts family life, couples, and Catholicism from a humanistic perspective.

== Biography ==
De la Hoz was born in Mexico City but moved to San Diego in 2012 when she was 40 years old. She earned a bachelor's degree in graphic design from Universidad Autónoma Metropolitana in Mexico City. She worked as a graphic designer for ten years before she decided to become a painter. She is married and has a daughter, Mariana, and a son Bernardo.

Her passion for art began at an early age but it wasn't until she turned 25 that she decided to focus on creating paintings instead of digital graphics. Her idea of magic realism has been labeled "white violence" due to her use of black humor and fantasy to demonstrate the darker side of humanity. She struggles with expressing herself efficiently but her art conveys everything she has to say. Through her paintings, de la Hoz aims to arouse viewers' consciousness and inspire critical thinking. Her dark humor and fantasy address topics such as politics, racism, religion, love, hate, identity, and sexuality. Her works have been displayed in galleries, museums, and universities around the world.

== Method ==
De la Hoz paints using egg tempera, a technique she learned from studying a book called Il libro dell’arte by Cennino Cennini. The ancient time-taking technique allows her to “indulge in conversation with the characters [she] is creating.” Her paintings follow a small format intended to capture every detail and bring the viewer closer to the painting. Her grandfather is one of her role models as well, stating, “He would point out grotesque things about the world, but always thought it was important to have good manners.”

== Reception ==
While living in Mexico City, de la Hoz became a subject of interest to Raquel Tibol. Raquel promoted her work and de la Hoz soon began to receive critical acclaim. After moving to the United States, she got the attention of curators who began to display her work. In 2012 Marianela was chosen for an exhibition at The San Diego Museum of Art by curator Amy Galpin who “was impressed with the strong responses her work inspires in viewers.” Susan Stewart, an English professor at Princeton, noted that her small-format paintings construct an internal connection between the viewer and the artist.

== Art ==
1. 2013, Heaven and Earth, the Determined Freedom for an Undetermined Life, San Diego Museum of Art
2. Mundos Pequeños / Small Worlds, Lora Schlesinger Gallery, Santa Monica, CA
3. Adiós a la Calle, Torre Ejecutiva Pemex, Mexico City, Mexico
