= Gǔ (surname) =

Gǔ (谷) is a Chinese surname. According to a 2013 study it was 158th-most common surname in China, shared by 990,000 people or 0.075% of the population, with the province having the most people with the surname being Henan. The literal meaning of the surname is "valley" or "gorge".

== Notable people ==
- Gu Kailai (谷开来 born 1958) is a Chinese former lawyer and businesswoman, wife of Bo Xilai
- Gu Junshan (谷俊山; born 1956) is a former lieutenant general in the People's Liberation Army (PLA)
- Gu Mu (谷牧; 1914–2009) was a Chinese revolutionary figure and politician
- Ku Cheng-ting (谷正鼎; 1903–1974) was a politician elected to the Legislative Yuan in 1948; younger brother of Ku Cheng-kang
- Ku Cheng-kang (谷正綱; 1902–1993) was a politician who served as Interior Minister of the Republic of China in 1950; older brother of Ku Cheng-ting
- Eileen Gu Olympic skier born in the United States representing People's Republic of China in the 2022 Winter Olympics
