= Kenshiro Abbe =

Japanese martial artist (1915–1985)

- Born: 15 December 1915; Tokushima Prefecture, Japan
- Died: 1 December 1985 (aged 69); Tokushima Prefecture, Japan; Stroke
- Native name: 阿部 謙四郎
- Style: Aikido, Judo, Kendo, jukendo and others
- Teachers: Kinnosuke Ogawa, Morihei Ueshiba
- Rank: 8th dan judo, 6th dan aikido, 6th dan kendo, and others

Other information
- Spouse: Keiko Abbe
- Children: Junko Abbe, Noriko Abbe, Yayoi Abbe
- Notable students: Robin Otani, Kenneth Williams, David Williams Henry Ellis, Vernon Bell

Kenshiro Abbe (阿部 謙四郎, Abe Kenshirō; 15 December 1915 – 1 December 1985) (Note: The Japanese surname "Abbe" is more typically written in English as "Abe." With regard to Kenshiro Abbe, however, he himself and most sources use "Abbe." Most sources give 1915 and 1985 as Abbe's years of birth and death, but some sources give slightly different years (e.g., born in 1916 or died in 1989).) was a Japanese master of judo, aikido, and kendo. He introduced aikido to the United Kingdom in 1955, and founded the Kyushindo system. Abbe was a graduate of the Budo Senmon Gakko, having studied judo and kendo there. Following an early career in the martial arts, he served in the Imperial Japanese Army before and during World War II. He then trained in aikido under its founder, Morihei Ueshiba, for a decade. Abbe held dan ranks in several martial arts, most notably 8th dan in judo, 6th dan in aikido, and 6th dan in kendo. After introducing aikido to the UK, he established several Japanese martial arts councils there during the late 1950s. He returned to Japan in 1964 and remained there for most of the remainder of his life. There are contradictory accounts of Abbe's final years, but it appears that he was in poor spirits and poor health towards the end.

== Early life ==
Abbe was born on 15 December 1915 in a village in Tokushima Prefecture, on the island of Shikoku, Japan. He was the son of Toshizo Abbe, who was the local school's headmaster and a kendo instructor, and his wife, Kote Abbe. (Note: Translation of Japanese names into English is not always consistent; where more than one English version exists, this article uses the more common version, if known.) The couple had four sons and five daughters, and Abbe was the youngest child in the family. On 4 September 1919, when Abbe was not yet four years old, his father drowned in a flash flood while training in the mountains. A young schoolteacher, Manpei Hino, subsequently became a father figure for the young boy and introduced him to the martial arts, including sumo. Abbe went on to become a local school champion in sumo.

In 1929, Abbe began learning judo from Kazohira Nakamoto, a former police officer. That same year, he was promoted to the rank of 1st dan in the art and, unusually, he reached 2nd dan the next year, and 3rd dan the year after that. Thus, at the age of 16, he became the youngest judo student ever promoted to 3rd dan—an honour he received directly from Shohei Hamano, an instructor of the Dai Nippon Butoku Kai (abbreviated to 'Butoku Kai' or 'Butokukwai'), which was the official governing body for Japanese martial arts. Abbe also became champion of the Tokushima High School Judo League that year. During his fifth year at the school, Abbe entered a regional tournament involving 30 towns, serving as captain for the team from the town of Kawashima. His speed and agility helped him to many victories, and he received the nickname 'Pegasus' accordingly.

At his 1st dan judo examination, Abbe had caught the attention of Shotaro Tobata from the Butoku Kai, who had been refereeing at the event. Tobata had suggested to Nakamoto and Abbe that the young man should apply for entry to the renowned Budo Senmon Gakko (abbreviated to 'Busen,' and sometimes referred to as 'Busen College'), a specialist college for martial artists. With the additional help of a teacher named Nakano, Abbe now prepared for the entrance examination in Kyoto. Out of all the candidates, of which there were around 300 that year, 20 would be accepted into the judo programme and 20 into the kendo programme. Abbe performed well and was accepted into both programmes.

== Budo Senmon Gakko training ==
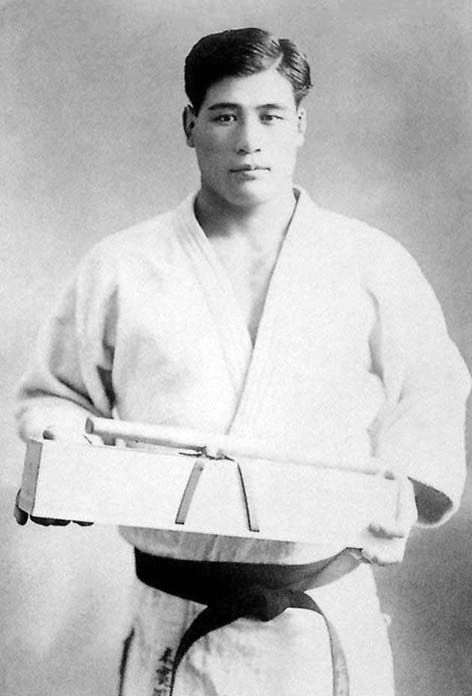
Masahiko Kimura was perhaps Abbe's most famous opponent in judo competition

In 1934, Abbe moved to Kyoto with his mother and his sister Toyoka so that he could attend Busen, training in both the judo and kendo programmes. Abbe learned kendo under the direction of Busen's head sword instructor, Kinnosuke Ogawa, a master who held the rank of 10th dan. He recalled that his instructor, at the age of 75 years, was so skilled that he could not be touched by any of the students or younger instructors. Every Saturday afternoon at Busen, following tradition, judo tournaments were held. Abbe fought five opponents in succession with each contest lasting five minutes, and he won all or almost all of these matches. In his first year at Busen, he was promoted to 4th dan in judo. In the autumn of his second year there, he was promoted to 5th dan, by which time he was reported to have been fighting 20 opponents in succession.

In May 1935, Abbe competed in the 5th dan division championship and defeated Masahiko Kimura. This match was one of only four professional career losses for Kimura, who was already well known as one of the best judo competitors in Japan, and would later gain further fame for defeating Hélio Gracie of Brazilian Jiu-Jitsu. According to biographers Keith Morgan and Henry Ellis, Kimura was heard to remark after the match that fighting Abbe was "like fighting a shadow." Abbe was listed at 5 ft 5 in (165 cm) in height and 156 pounds (71 kg) in weight at the time; Kimura was only an inch taller, but much heavier at 187 pounds (85 kg). Two years later, during which time Kimura trained hard, he sought Abbe out at the Kodokan and soundly defeated him in a 20-minute practice session.

While at Busen, Abbe also enrolled in Hajime Tanabe's philosophy class at Kyoto University (then known as Kyoto Teikoku Daigaku, or 'Kyoto Imperial University'). During this period, his sister Toyoko began studying Tendō-ryū naginata under a female instructor named Mitamura Chiyo (in Japan, arts focusing on the handling of naginata have been practiced almost exclusively by women since the Edo period), and she would continue practicing that art for the rest of her life.

Following graduation from Busen, Abbe became an instructor in judo at the college, as well as taking instructor positions with the Osaka police force and a high school in Kyoto. The Butoku Kai promoted him to 6th dan in judo in 1937.

== Military service ==
In June 1937, Abbe enlisted in the Imperial Japanese Army, and was subsequently posted to a garrison in Manchuria. He served there for four years, during which time he was unable to continue training in judo but was able to practise kendo. While abroad, he began formulating his Kyushindo philosophy. His tour of duty ended in 1941, and he returned to Kyoto, where he met and married his wife Keiko. Abbe did not remain a civilian for long, however, since Japan entered World War II near the end of that year.

Abbe was assigned to a training unit in Tokushima Prefecture, where he studied and mastered jūkendō (bayonet). It was around this time that he first met Morihei Ueshiba, founder of aikido, who had also trained in jūkendō. Ueshiba was around 60 years old at this time, around twice Abbe's age. Rogers, Ellis, and Eastman (2004) give the following account of their first meeting:

It was during a train journey in Japan that Abbe first met Ueshiba. Abbe didn't know who he was and he reacted to Ueshiba looking at him, saying: "What are you staring at, old man?" Ueshiba replied: "I know who you are," to which Abbe modestly retorted: "Everyone knows me, I am Kenshiro Abbe, Champion of All Japan." Ueshiba then introduced himself as the Founder of Aikido, and was told by Abbe that he didn't look strong enough to be a martial arts master. Ueshiba then offered Abbe his little finger, and said: "But young man, you look very strong indeed. Please break my finger." Abbe at first declined, but eventually accepted the challenge, presumably to shut the old man up. Abbe claimed that, as he took hold of the old man's finger and tried to break it, he found himself on the floor of the carriage and totally immobilised. Whilst on the floor Abbe asked Ueshiba for permission to study under him.

Morgan and Ellis (2006) give a slightly different account:

While travelling on a train Abbe noticed an older man staring at him who then asked if he was a 5th Dan Judo. Abbe replied “Why yes, how did you know that?” “Because you have the build of a 5th Dan. So who are you?“ Kenshiro replied: “Everyone knows who I am, I am Kenshiro Abbe, Judo champion of all Japan! “ Yes, I can see that,“ the old man replied. The old man continued to talk to Kenshiro much to his annoyance as he wanted to get some sleep. Eventually, the old man put a finger in Kenshiro’s face, “You are so powerful, break my finger!” Kenshiro was only too happy to oblige. He took the finger, expecting to snap it like a twig, and wham! He found himself on the carriage floor under the full control of the old man. The old man allowed Kenshiro to get back into his seat. “Who are you?” Kenshiro Abbe asked. “I am Morihei Ueshiba, the founder of Aikido.” Kenshiro Abbe was astounded at the technique of the old man and requested that he become his student.

Abbe studied aikido under Ueshiba for 10 years, eventually reaching the rank of 6th dan in that art. During this period, the Abbes had two daughters: Junko and Noriko.

In 1945, the Butoku Kai promoted Abbe to 7th dan in judo and 6th dan in kendo. Following the end of World War II, however, the Butoku Kai and Busen were both closed down. Abbe took up the position of a judo teacher for the Kyoto Prefectural Police Department. He became Chief Instructor of judo for the Kyoto police, and also taught at Doshisha University in that city. After the Abbes had a third daughter, Yayoi, Abbe resigned from the Kyoto police. During this period, he felt that judo in Japan was declining, and ended his association with the Kodokan in the 1950s.

== Europe ==
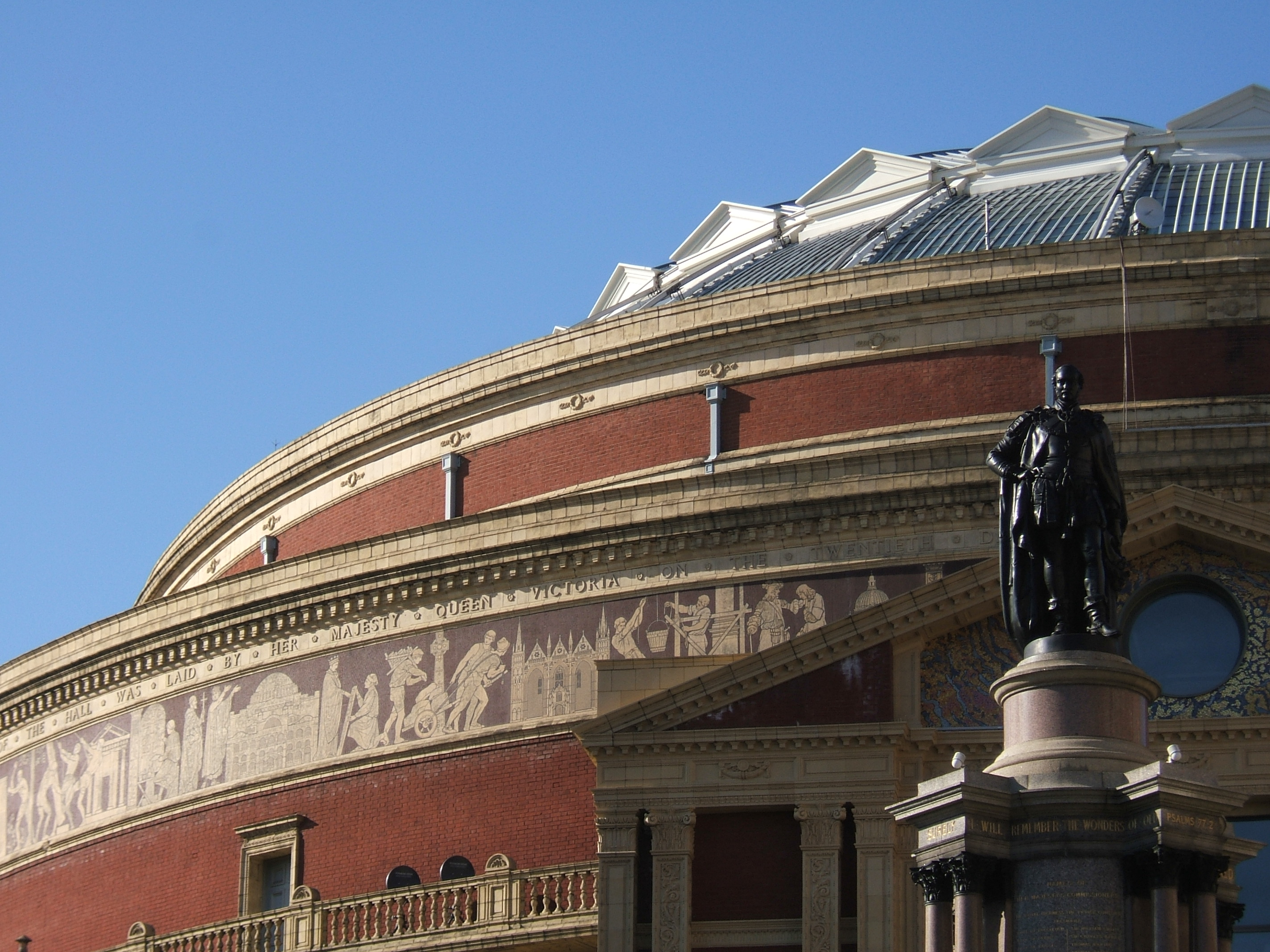
Royal Albert Hall, where Abbe gave one of the earliest demonstrations of aikido in the UK

In 1955, Abbe travelled to the United Kingdom. He went at the invitation of the London Judo Society (LJS), and was the first master to teach aikido in the UK. That year, he demonstrated aikido at the LJS and at the Royal Albert Hall in London. Abbe came to experience two problems at the LJS: first, he felt that the students there were more concerned with competition than his theories, and second, he felt that the students did not treat him with the appropriate respect for someone of his rank and experience in the martial arts. According to the International Budo Council (IBC), he founded the IBC in 1955. (Note: Differing accounts exist regarding the organisations that Abbe founded. The people involved, the roles of these people, and the years of establishment vary depending on the source.)

Abbe proceeded to teach aikido at his own dojo (training hall), affectionately known as 'The Hut,' which was located behind a pub in Hillingdon, London. Training was rigorous and, due to Abbe's poor command of English, he would often make corrections by using a shinai (practice sword) to hit the body part that was out of place; Ellis recalled that Abbe would say, "My English is poor but my shinai speaks fluently." Abbe's approach to self-defence matched his no-nonsense approach to training, and was demonstrated when three youths tried to rob him one evening. Geoff Thomson (1998) wrote:

He was walking down a quiet suburban street on his way home after his usual evening teaching session. He noticed three youths hovering several yards away on the opposite side of the street. When they approached him he was ready. "Give us your money, or you'll get hurt" said the leader of the three. Abbe looked at each one in turn, then casually took his wallet out of his jacket pocket, throwing it on the floor between himself and the antagonists. He pointed to the wallet and said, "I am prepared to die for that wallet, what about you?" The three would-be attackers looked at the wallet on the floor, then at Abbe and then at each other and then moved away. Abbe picked up his wallet and calmly walked home.

Speaking about the incident, Ellis said, "Not a lot of love and harmony from Abbe sensei, simply an attitude and language these thugs understood."

In 1958, Abbe founded the British Judo Council (BJC), (Note: The British Judo Council's founding year is most commonly given as 1958, which includes a BJC source, but other sources have given 1956 or 1969. Some sources mention Abbe alone in the founding role, while others also mention Masutaro Otani or Bill Woods. At least two sources indicate that Otani founded his own judo school and that this organisation and the BJC merged in 1970.) and he went on to establish the British Aikido Council, British Karate Council, British Kendo Council, and British Kyudo Council. At this stage, he was travelling extensively through the UK and Europe, and also invited Japanese martial art masters to teach in the UK; these included Mitsusuke Harada (Shotokan karate) and Tadashi Abe (aikido). During this period, Abbe's family remained in Japan. Robinson (2007) wrote, "[he] did invite his family to live with him in London however they refused, apparently not at all attracted by the life style that Kenshiro offered them in England."

Abbe was involved in a car accident in 1960 which left him with severe neck injuries that had lasting effects on his health. While the precise date is unclear, Abbe had been promoted to 8th dan by late 1960. Independent sources from the late 1960s include this rank with his name. In addition to his ranks in judo, aikido, and kendo, he held the rank of 5th dan in karate and dan ranks in kyūdō and jūkendō.

British professional wrestler Peter Thornley, best known as the original masked version of Kendo Nagasaki, has reported that in the early 1960s Abbe trained him in judo and kendo and that the samurai sword he used in character as Nagasaki was a personal gift from Abbe.

In 1964, Abbe returned to Japan for the Summer Olympics in Tokyo. While in his homeland, he met with Ueshiba, updated him on the progress of aikido in the UK, and asked him to send another instructor to the UK to continue teaching the art. In 1966, Ueshiba sent Kazuo (T. K.) Chiba to the UK to continue the work Abbe had begun. Henry O'Tani (2009) has stated that during Abbe's absence from the UK, a dismissed BJC senior executive and several senior instructors misappropriated his financial and organisational resources and set up their own BJC group. In 1969, Abbe returned to the UK, but was distraught by the situation with this group that he had not authorised. (Note: According to different sources, Abbe returned to the UK in either 1969 or 1967.) When he asked former colleagues to help him rebuild the organisation, they refused; he subsequently left the UK, never to return.

== Later life ==
There are contradictory accounts of Abbe's last years in Japan. Morgan and Ellis (2006) state that he lived with his family for the remainder of his life, while Cavalcanti (2004) and Bagot (2007) claim that there were problems and that he ended up living apart from his family. Sources appear to agree, however, that Abbe was in poor spirits and poor health towards the end of his life. He suffered a stroke on 17 November 1985, and was hospitalised.

Abbe died on 1 December 1985 in Japan. According to at least two sources, he had chosen to donate his body for medical education at Saitama University, so it was not immediately laid to rest. Abbe's funeral was held on 10 June 1986 at Zuiganji Temple, located south of Mount Bizan in Tokushima, and he was buried or commemorated at the family grave there. Robinson (2007) wrote, "Abbe was the master who introduced Kendo, Aikido, Karate, Kyodo, Jukendo, Iaido, Yarido and Naginatado to Europe yet he died almost totally alone and forgotten by most."

== See also ==
- Masutaro Otani
- Gunji Koizumi
- List of aikidoka
- List of judoka
