= Budo Senmon Gakko =

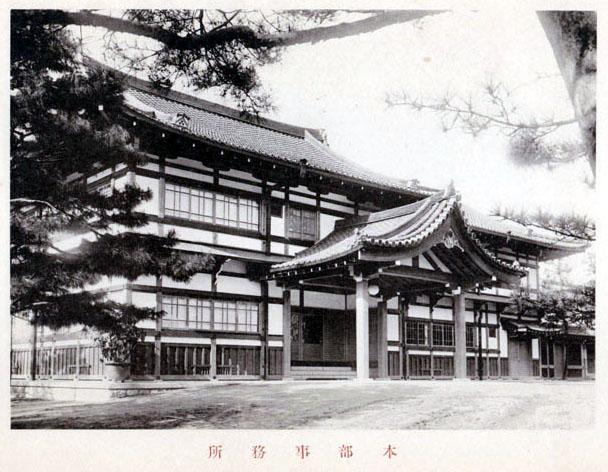
Butokuden in 1899

Budo Senmon Gakko (武道専門学校, Budō Senmon Gakkō) also known as Butoku Gakko, Bujutsu Senmon Gakko, or Busen (武専), was a school for training young men and women in Japanese martial arts. There were four departments; kendo, judo, naginata and kyūdō.

The school was based at Butokuden, a famous training hall in Kyoto, Japan.

The building is still in use for martial arts exhibitions.

== Founding ==
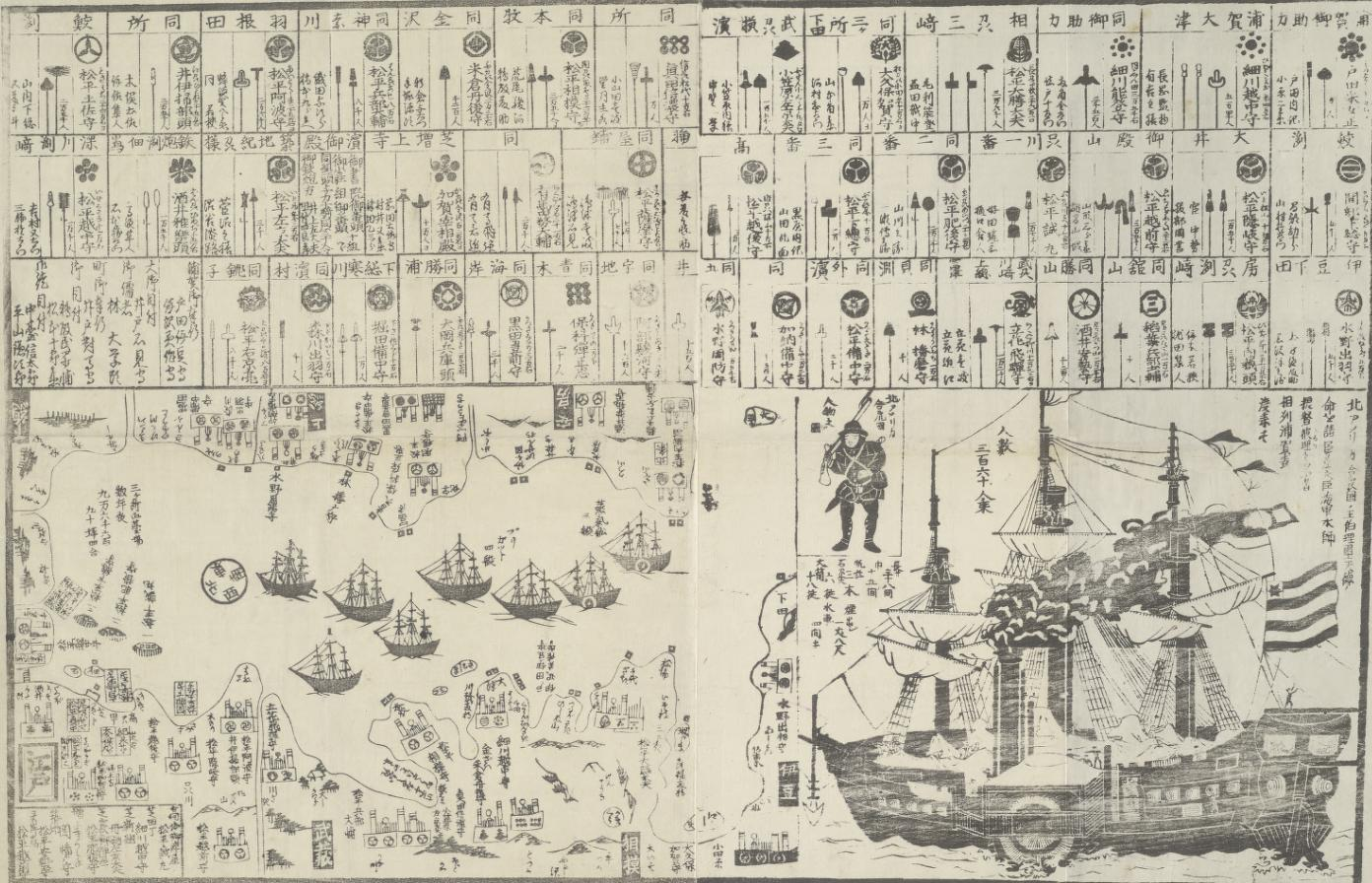
Japanese 1854 print describing Commodore Perry's "Black Ships".

The need for Busen arose from a nationalistic fervour in Japan after the Sino-Japanese War (1894–1895). Increased Japanese nationalism led to an increased interest in the "martial way".

Traditionally, Japanese martial arts had been taught as part of the standard curriculum in schools across Japan. The arrival of Commodore Matthew Perry's "Black Ships" in 1853 caused the Japanese to abandon their "archaic" martial arts and use western firepower. Martial arts were considered outdated and part of Japan's feudal history, and schools deemphasized traditional martial arts.

Interest in martial arts was raised again in 1873 by Sakakibara Kenkichi, a proud man of hatamoto status who was disturbed by the loss of traditional swordsmanship and martial arts. He arranged a series of performances by well known martial artists called gekken kogyo. Despite the entrance fee, these events became immensely popular and once again raised interest in martial arts.

By 1880 the police had recognised the importance of Kendo and other traditional martial arts and wrote it into the Police Academy guidelines that all cadets should be instructed in Kendo.

== Beyond Kendo ==
This popularity also raised interest in the field of education. In the 1870s, there were a number of people who were raising concerns over the total westernisation of Japanese schools. The Ministry of Education carried out an investigation, the most notable in 1883 by the National Institute of Gymnastics (Taiso Denshujo), and then the 1896 investigation carried out by the School Health Advisors' Board (Gakko Eisei Komonkai). The conclusion of both of these surveys was that it would be inappropriate to introduce bujutsu (Japanese martial arts in general) into the school curriculum, in anything other than a spiritual way (the 1896 survey suggested that boys over 16 could study bujutsu).

This led to a number of people, notably Ozawa Unosuke and Nakajima Kenzo, to try to develop a gymnastics adaptation of bujutsu. This was met with some criticism, and it was noted that the techniques were ineffective and did not take into account the blade or the direction of travel.

1895 marked the 1,100th year of Kyoto becoming the capital of Japan. Emperor Kanmu is said to have constructed a Butokuden (Hall of Martial Virtue) to promote martial spirit and encourage warriors. In commemoration of this, the Dai Nippon Butoku Kai (Butoku Kai) was established in Kyoto, under the authority of the Minister of Education. The formation of the Butoku Kai was a major turning point for getting martial arts back into the school curriculum. The goals of the Butoku Kai were to standardise the plethora of martial disciplines found throughout the nation.

In 1905, a division of the Butoku Kai was formed to train bujutsu instructors called Bujutsu Kyoin Yoseijo. This system was revised and improved a number of times, and then led to the formation of the Butoku Gakko (School of Martial Virtue) in 1911. This became known as the Bujutsu Senmon Gakko (Bujutsu Specialist School) in 1912, and then the Budo Senmon Gakko in 1919 when the term 'budo' officially replaced 'bujutsu'. The Budo Senmon Gakko (or Busen as it became known) together with the Tokyo Koto Shihan Gakko (Tokyo Higher Normal School) led the way in producing young instructors; these would be posted to schools throughout the country, to teach children the arts.

The first class of 8 students graduated in March 1914.

Budo Senmon Gakko continued to produce excellent instructors until the outbreak of World War II, as more and more students were drafted into the Japanese military. After the war, Allied occupation forces prohibited opening the school. It remained vacant for decades. The buildings have since been restored and upgraded, and now tournaments are held in the dojo.

== Daily Routine ==
Training at Budo Senmon Gakko followed a rigorous schedule:

- 0600-0700 Asa-geiko (Morning Practice): In their first year, students trained in one basic cutting technique for the whole year. In further years, they moved on to train in more complex techniques.
- 0700-0800 Breakfast
- 0800-1200 Lectures: Instruction usually consisting of Japanese language, calligraphy, and the old Japanese language.
- 1200-1300 Lunch
- 1300-1500 Keiko (Practice): Training in the same way as during the morning practice.
- 1500-1600 Voluntary Practice: Additional training, of which attendance was nominally voluntary but informally required as a social expectation.

== See also ==
- Dai Nippon Butoku Kai
- Kenshiro Abbe
