= Robin Otani =

President of the British Judo Council

- Born: 3 January 1944 (age 81)
- Organization: British Judo Council
- Title: President of BJC
- Father: Masutaro Otani

Robin Otani (born 3 January 1944) is a British judo teacher and president of the British Judo Council. He is also the brother of kendo master Tomio Otani and the son of judo master Masutaro Otani. Robin learnt judo under his father and judo master Kenshiro Abbe.

== Life ==
Robin Otani is the son of judo master Masutaro Otani. He began fighting senior judoka at 13 years old. Robin Otani has been the president of the BJC since the death of his father in 1977. Robin by choice holds no grade, but was presented with a red and white belt by Akinori Hosaka. Robin trained under Masutaro Otani and Kenshiro Abbe for whom he was personal assistant and secretary.
