= Masutaro Otani =

Japanese judo master

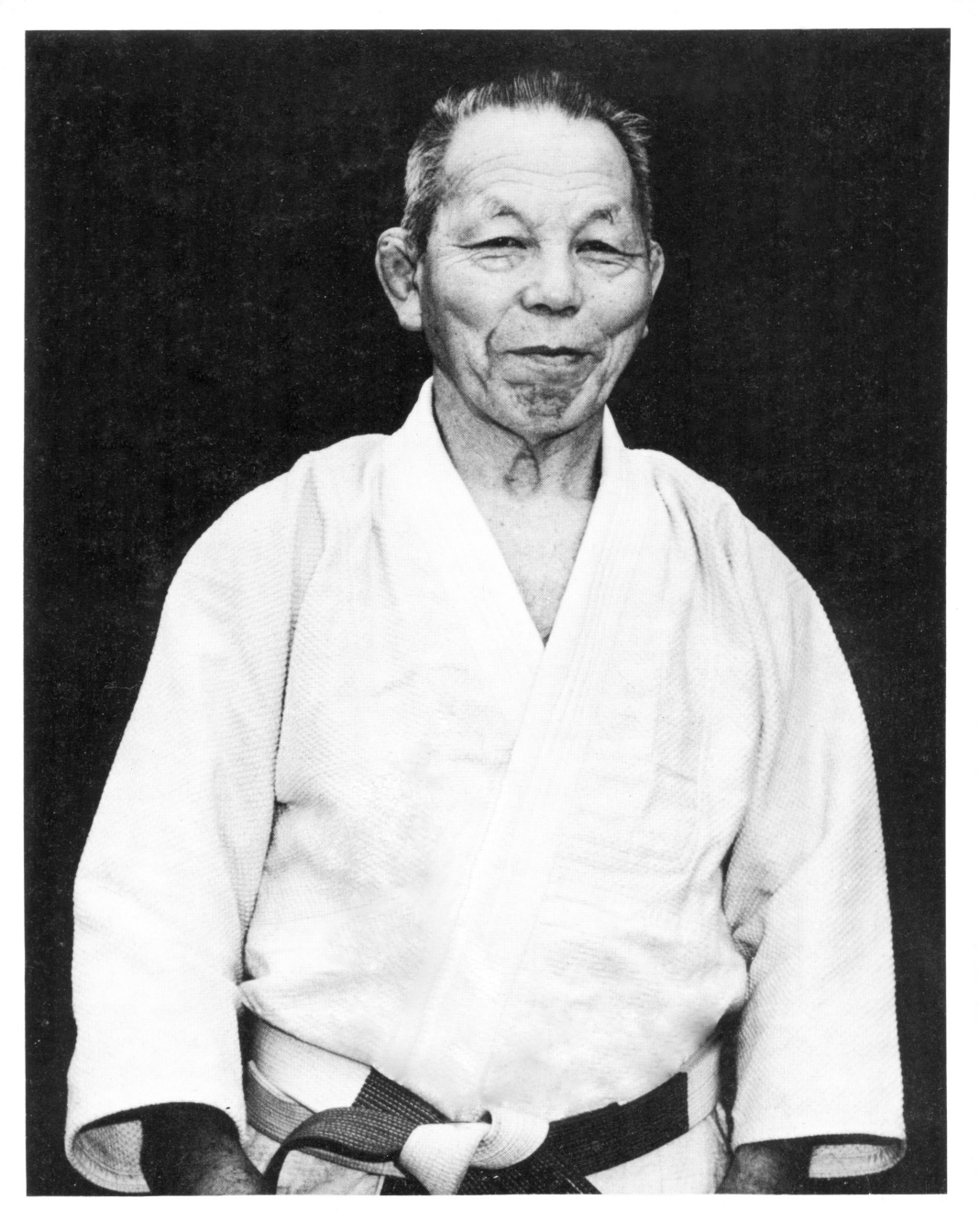
- Born: 25 March 1896; Goto Islands, Japan
- Died: 23 January 1977 (age 80); Northampton, United Kingdom
- Occupation: Japanese martial arts instructor
- Organization(s): British Judo Council and MOSJ
- Successor: Robin Otani

Masutaro Otani (大谷 増太郎, Otani Masutaro, 25 March 1896 - 23 January 1977), was an 8th-Dan Japanese master of judo and a pioneer of judo in the United Kingdom and a leading student of Yukio Tani. He was best known for his speed and agility and was reputed to be one of the fastest-throwing exponents ever seen. He is most notable as the president of the British Judo Council alongside Kenshiro Abbe. He held the rank of 8th dan in judo and is the father of Robin Otani, Tomio Otani and two other sons. He died on 23 January 1977, at the age of 80.

== Biography ==
Otani was a pioneer of judo in Britain. He began judo young, practising judo and kendo at school. He then left Japan as a teenager and moved to Colombo, Sri Lanka, where he trained under Seizo Usui for two years. He arrived in the United Kingdom in 1919 in Liverpool before moving to London, where he joined the Budokwai. At the Budokwai he trained mostly under Yukio Tani, who was the chief instructor, but had also trained under Hikoichi Aida. Otani was soon sent out to Oxford and Cambridge universities where he taught judo.

He had many public wrestling bouts against the United Kingdom and Europe's best wrestlers. In 1948, the British Judo Association was created. However, disappointed with the direction judo was heading in the United Kingdom, in 1954 Otani's loyal students founded an organisation on his behalf named the Masutaro Otani Society of Judo (the Jubilee Judo Club) in Harlesden and appointed him president. In 1955, Kenshiro Abbe arrived in London by personal invitation of the London Judo Society (LJS) but after several disagreements he left and partnered with Otani. Abbe founded a 'British Judo Council' in the 1950s with help from Otani, who became its 'master'. In 1969, Abbe returned to Japan and Otani became president of both organisations, before amalgamating them in 1970 into the modern day British Judo Council, of which he was president.

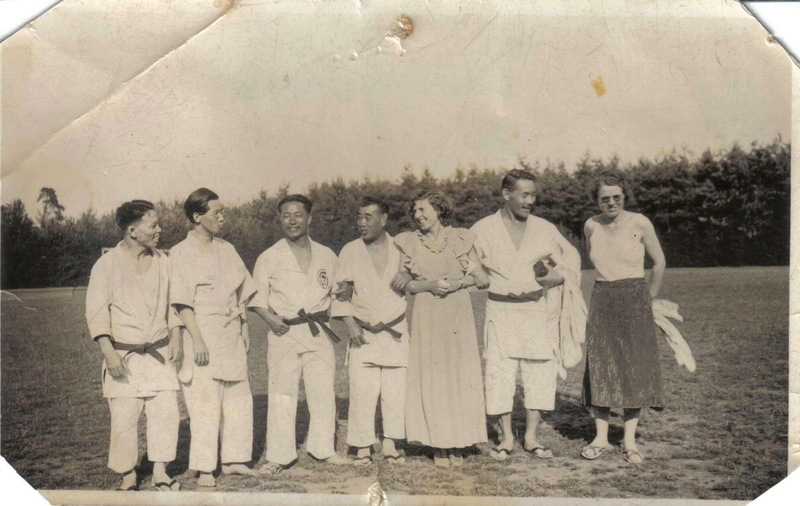
1933 Frankfurt

== Personal life ==
On 23 January 1977, Otani had a stroke before being taken to Northampton General Hospital where he died at the age of 80, 8th-dan. Upon his death, his son, Robin Otani, became president of the BJC.
