= Budokwai =

Martial arts club

Coordinates: 51°29′12″N 0°10′50″W

The Budokwai

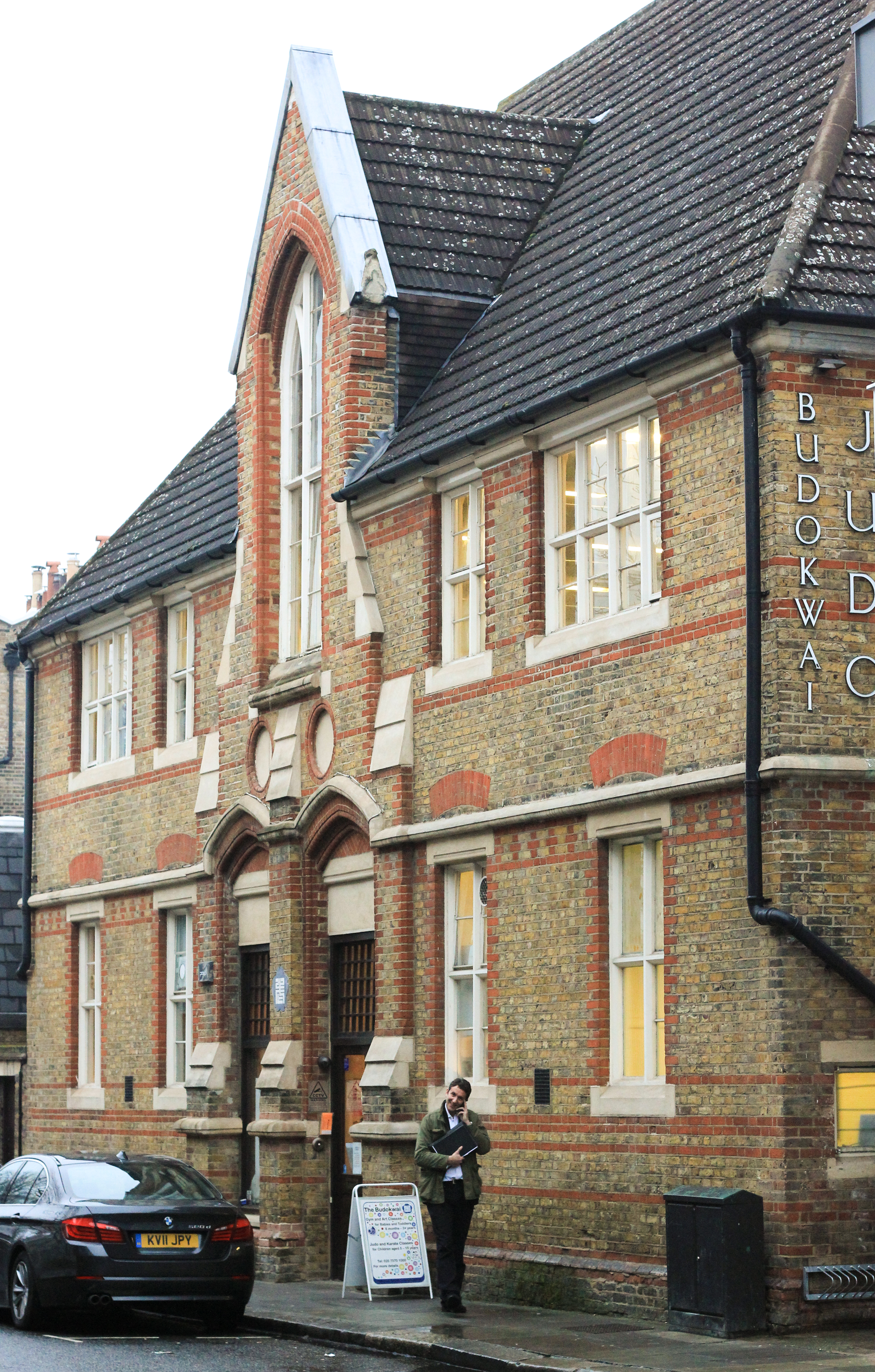
- Exterior of the Budokwai
- Date founded: 1918
- Country of origin: England
- Founder: Gunji Koizumi
- Arts taught: Judo, Karate, Brazilian jiu-jitsu, Aikido
- Official website: budokwai.co.uk

The Budokwai (The Way of Knighthood Society) (武道会, Budōkai; Society of the Martial Way) in London is the oldest Japanese martial arts club in Europe. It was founded in 1918 by Gunji Koizumi and initially offered tuition in jujutsu, kendo, and other Japanese martial arts. It was the first judo club in Europe.

== Name and symbol ==
The full name of the society is the Budokwai (The Way of Knighthood Society) but it is normally called the Budokwai. The name Budokwai was chosen by the society's founder Gunji Koizumi as a combination of the Japanese words bu (武) meaning military or martial, do (道) meaning the way or code, kwai (会) meaning public building or a society/club. This translates into English as Society of the Martial Way.

The symbol of the Budokwai is a stylised version of the kanji 武 in white on a blue cherry blossom, Koizumi said he chose the design as the character bu is made from the components 止, meaning stop, and 戈, meaning spear or fighting because "the aim of martial training is to stop fighting."

== History ==
Gunji Koizumi created the Budokwai as a society to teach judo, kendo and other Japanese arts to members of the public. He founded a dojo at 15 Lower Grosvenor Place, Victoria, London SW1 and the club official opened on Saturday 26 January 1918 with 12 members, making it the oldest judo club in Europe. It is also the oldest Japanese martial arts club in Europe. The first 36 members were Japanese, the first English man didn't join until March and the first English woman, Katherine Cooper-White, becoming the 60th member. Koizumi became the first president of the Budokwai and Yukio Tani the first chief judo instructor.

In July 1920, Dr. Jigoro Kano (the founder of judo) visited Britain and the Budokwai for the first time, he was accompanied by Hikoichi Aida who stayed in Britain and instructed at the Budokwai for two years. A member named Tanabe received his first Dan, becoming the Budokwai's first home-grown black belt. Tani and Koizumi were promoted to nidan. The club held annual shows between 11 May 1918 and 1968 after which shows were only held on special occasions.

The Budokwai was instrumental in the formation of the first British national and European wide judo organisations. Koizumi discussed his idea of forming a British nation Judo organisation and a European organisation with the Budokwai committee and in 1948 the chairman of the Budokwai, John Barnes, invited all British Judo clubs and all the Judo and Jujitsu clubs in Europe to a conference hosted by the Budokwai. The British Conference was held on 24 July 1948 at the Imperial College Union, London and during that three-hour meeting the British Judo Association was founded. This was the first ever amateur national judo association. The international conference took place on 26 and 28 July 1948 with four voting countries, Austria, Britain, the Netherlands and Italy, and one non-voting country, France, attending. The Budokwai's Trevor Leggett was elected the conference's chairman and a constitution drafted by the Budikwai was tabled. After alterations and discussion of the constitution a unanimous vote formed the European Judo Union.

In 1953 Teizo Kawamura, then a 6th Dan, came from the Kodokan in Japan to become chief instructor. After thirty-five years, the Budokwai moved to 4 Gilston Road, South Kensington, London, SW10 9SL. The new premises were officially opened in September 1954 by the Japanese Ambassador H.E. Matsumoto throwing Kawamura. In 1955 Charles Palmer and Geof Gleeson became chief instructors at the Budokwai. In the 1960s the club began teaching karate with links to the Japan Karate Association with a number of Japanese instructors teaching at the Budokwai, including Keinosuke Enoeda 1963 All-Japan champion, who became the chief instructor. In the same decade aikido began to be practiced at the club. With the growth of international Judo competition and especially when judo became an Olympic sport in 1964 the emphasis of judo at the Budokwai moved towards sport and competition judo. Three Budokwai members made were part of the first British Olympic team, Brian Jacks, Syd Hoare and Tony Sweeney.

== Activities ==
In 2017 The Budokwai ran classes in Judo, Karate, Aikido, Brazilian Jiu Jitsu, Pilates, Hontai Yōshin-Ryū Ju-Jutsu and activities for babies and toddlers. Judo is taught every day with separate classes held for children of different ages, adult beginners and experienced judoka. Separate grading events take place once a month on Sundays. As of 2013, the chief instructor is Peter Blewett who has held the post since 1986 and the head junior instructor is Larry Stevenson.

Shotokan Karate is practiced five days a week at the Budokwai with both children's and adult classes. The chief karate instructor is Yoshinobu Ohta who holds a karate 8th Dan. Brazilian Jiu-Jitsu is run by Ray Stevens. Hontai Yōshin-ryū ju-jutsu takes place once a week with instructor Dr. Mike McClure 6th Dan.

== The Budokwai in the media ==
The Budokwai had a showreel filmed in 2014, directed by actor/director Lucy Charles and shot by WhitePartridge Media. In recent years, The Budokwai has also featured on BT Sport's Beyond the Octagon, BBC One's The One Show and most recently in a short film for The British Open. The film was commissioned by the British Judo Association, and starred Peter Blewett and Kyle Perry. The film, Hard Lesson The Gentle Way was produced and directed by Lucy Charles, The Sports Presentation Company and Six More Than Forty.

The Pyjama Game a book by Mark Law was described by the Observer as "A fascinating journey in which he unravels this most opaque of sports with humour, verve and style. Part travelogue, part history, part chronicle of midlife discovery, The Pyjama Game is an illuminating exposition of an enigmatic and marginal sport." Independent on Sunday "A fantastic voyage, beautifully written, through this most challenging of sports." Matthew d'Ancona in The Spectator called it "a brilliant exploration of judo". The Pyjama Game, which tells the story of judo from its Samurai origins through its development by Jigoro Kano and adoption across the world, includes accounts of the careers of some of the greatest champions including Yasuhiro Yamashita, Neil Adams, Katsuhiko Kashiwazaki and Tamura Ryoko Tani. Mark Law has trained at the Budokwai in Chelsea, London since 1994 where he has studied under Tony Sweeney, Ray Stevens, Peter Blewett, Winston Gordon and Roger Gracie.

A portrait painting of Yukio Tani by George Lambourn, in the ownership of The Budokai, was restored by Lucia Scalisi during an August 2018 episode of the BBC Television programme The Repair Shop.

== Governance ==
The Budokwai is a democratic non-profit making organisation with full, associated and honorary members. Only full members have financial responsibility and voting rights in the club and there can only be 45 full members. Peter Blewett is the current Chairman of the Executive Committee.

== Notable members ==
The budokwai's membership has included a number of notable individuals. In March 1936 Sarah Mayer became the first non-Japanese woman to gain a Dan grade (black belt) in Judo. She had started practicing judo at the Budokwai in the 1920s before traveling independently to Japan in 1934 with a letter of introduction from the Budokwai to train in judo. As of 2013 Olympian judoka Raymond Stevens and Winston Gordon are active members, other Olympian members have included Neil Adams, Brian Jacks, Angelo Parisi and John Jayne. Celebrity members have included musicians Kylie Minogue, Simon Le Bon and Mick Jagger. Sportsmen from other areas who have trained in judo at the Budokwai include Brazilian jiu-jitsu champion Roger Gracie and Olympic runner Sebastian Coe. William Hague British politician and Foreign Secretary who regularly partnered Sebastian Coe for judo training at the Budokwai.

Journalist Mark Law began judo at the club in his fifties and wrote a book about his experiences in 2007 called The Pyjama Game, A Journey Into Judo.

Other notable members have included Valerie Singleton, Yasmin Le Bon and Guy Ritchie

== Notable instructors ==
The Budokwai have had a number of notable instructors including a number of famous Japanese judoka and guest instructors. Kisaburo Watanabe Asian Games Champion 1964 and in 2010 Kosei Inoue spent 10 months instructing at the Budokwai, other Japanese instructors have included Kisaburo Watanabe Katsuhiko Kashiwazaki and Yasuhiro Yamashita. Olympic medalist Raymond Stevens has been a regular instructor for many years. George Kerr was also served as an instructor.

== See also ==
- Website
- Judo in the United Kingdom
