= Charles Palmer (judoka) =

British martial artist

Charles Palmer OBE
- Born: 15 April 1930; Ealing, United Kingdom
- Died: 17 August 2001 (aged 71); United Kingdom
- Style: Judo
- Teacher(s): Gunji Koizumi; Trevor Leggett; Kodokan
- Rank: jūdan (10th dan); Senior Instructor at the Budokwai; President of the British Judo Association; President of the International Judo Federation; Chairman of the British Olympic Association

Charles Stuart William Palmer OBE (15 April 1930 – 17 August 2001) was a British martial artist. Palmer was a judo instructor, President of the Budokwai, President of the British Judo Association (1961–1985), President of the International Judo Federation (1965–1979) and Chairman of the British Olympic Association (1983–1988). Palmer was a judoka who attained the sport's highest rank of 10th dan black belt.

== Sports career ==
Charles Palmer first took an interest in judo at the age of 14 while attending Drayton Manor High School. He joined Ealing Judo Club by claiming that he was 16 years old. In 1948, under the teachings of Gunji Koizumi and Trevor Leggett of the Budokwai, he was awarded the grade of 1st dan black belt.

At age 18, Palmer was called up for National Service where served with the Royal Military Police teaching judo. While serving in the military, he was given special leave to compete for the United Kingdom in his first International tournament in the Netherlands. On completion of his National Service he gained his 2nd dan at the Budokwai.

In 1951 Palmer went to Japan to further his judo studies. With a job as security guard at the British Embassy in Tokyo he was able to further his judo studies as a special student (kenshusei) at the Kodokan Judo Institute where he was awarded 3rd dan in 1953 and 4th dan in 1955.

On his return from Japan, Charles Palmer and fellow 4th dan, Geof Gleeson, joined Gunji Koizumi and Trevor Leggett as Senior Instructor at the Budokwai. He won a place in the British judo team in the 1957 European Championships. With Gleeson as captain in 1955 - 1958, this team won the championship for three years in succession.

As a Judo competitor, he was a formidable opponent. He had a short, powerful build, weighing some 225 lb for a height of 5 ft 8½ in. Opponents remembered him as 'an irresistible tank on two legs'. He was difficult to shift off balance, and his speciality was a devastating inner thigh throw (Uchi Mata).

== Later career ==
Palmer then retired from major competition and concentrated on Judo and sports administration. In 1961 Palmer became Chairman of the British Judo Association, a post he held for the next twenty-four years. During this time, Palmer was also elected President of the British Judo Association (BJA).

At the 1965 International Judo Federation (IJF) Congress held in Rio de Janeiro Palmer was elected president succeeding Risei Kano the grandson of the founder of judo, Kano Jigoro. He was the first non-Japanese to be the President of the IJF.

He persuaded the International Olympic Committee (IOC) to give Judo regular place on the Games program from 1972. In the 1973 New Year Honours, Palmer was appointed Officer of the Order of the British Empire (OBE). In 1975 he became a founding member of the General Assembly of International Sports Federations (GAISF) and for the next twelve years was General Secretary of that organisation.

In 1983 Charles Palmer was successful in an election for the post of Chairman of the British Olympic Association (BOA). During his period of office had to contend with much political wrangling; he had been influential in the decision of the BOA to send a team to attend the 1980 Summer Olympics in Moscow, in opposition to the opinion of the then Prime Minister, Margaret Thatcher (which he felt had cost him the possibility of a knighthood).

He received an honorary 10th dan in 1997 from the IJF, becoming one of the few living jūdan.

== Personal life ==
Palmer had a flamboyant personality with a somewhat overbearing and confrontational manner that earned him many enemies. For many years he smoked expensive cigars. When he came back from Japan, he drove around Kensington in a Jaguar SS100. In later years he drove his Rolls-Royce to European countries because he preferred its comfort to flying, although he was a qualified pilot. He was a fine card player and owned two gambling casinos, as well as restaurants. As recreations, he had been a drummer in a jazz band, a fine cook and was an expert skier. He was an accomplished linguist, speaking French, Japanese, German and Spanish. Despite having many female admirers, he never married.

In the 1990s his health began to fail, but he continued to attend and preside over BJA Annual General Meetings. He was taken to hospital on 16 August 2001 where he died the next day at the age of 71.
