= JudoScotland =

Governing body for judo in Scotland

- Sport: Judo
- Affiliation: British Judo Association
- Location: South Platt Hill, Ratho Edinburgh
- Chairman: Marc Preston
- CEO: Judith McCleary
- Coach: Euan Burton

Official website
- judoscotland.com
- (Scotland)

JudoScotland is the national governing body for judo in Scotland. It was founded in 1988 to represent Scottish judoka, coaches, referees and officials, clubs and the Scottish National Judo Team. JudoScotland is the sportscotland recognised governing body for the Olympic sport of Judo within Scotland. It is currently situated in Edinburgh International Climbing Arena (EICA) in Ratho.

JudoScotland tried to capitalise on the opportunities presented by the London Olympic Games in 2012 and the Glasgow Commonwealth Games in 2014 to expand the participation in judo in Scotland through its Izou 2014 Strategic Plan.

== Famous Judoka ==
Medal record

Olympic Games
| Bronze medal – third place | Sally Conway | 2016 |

Judo World Masters
| Gold medal – first place | Jonathan Gavin | 2001 |

World Judo Championships
| Gold medal – first place | Graeme Randall | 1999 |
| Bronze medal – third place | Sally Conway | 2019 |
| Bronze medal – third place | Euan Burton | 2010 |
| Bronze medal – third place | Euan Burton | 2007 |

- Jonathan Gavin, 6th Dan, World Masters gold
- Euan Burton, 3rd Dan, two times World Championships bronze
- Sally Conway, 5th Dan, Olympic Games and World Championships bronze
- Christopher Sherrington, 1st Dan, Grand Prix silver
- Sarah Clark, 6th Dan, European Championship gold, silver and bronze
- George Kerr, 10th Dan, three times European Championship silver
- Graeme Randall, 6th Dan, World Championships gold

== Events ==
=== Men's European Cup Event 2013 ===
Glasgow was chosen to host a men's European Cup Event in October 2013. The European Cup events are prestigious events which players can gain points to improve their world rank. The Glasgow European Open was held in the Emirates Arena with judoka from 24 different nations taking part. Day one saw -60 kg, -66 kg and -73 kg judoka in action. JudoScotlands’s Patrick Dawson fought in -73 kg and achieved a 7th place. Day two saw -81 kg, -90 kg, -100 kg and +100 kg fights take place. JudoScotland's Matthew Purssey finished with a bronze in the -90 kg category, James Austin finished in 7th place in the -100 kg, Chris Sherrington lost the bronze fight therefore finishing with a 5th place in the +100 kg category and Euan Burton won the gold medal in his new category -100 kg. Glasgow will host the Women's European Cup Event in 2014 shortly after the Commonwealth Games.

=== Commonwealth Games 2014 ===
Popularity for the 2014 Commonwealth Games in Glasgow is growing exponentially as the day of the opening ceremony quickly approaches. Approximately 92% of the total number of tickets available - for the 11 days of sporting events - have already sold out; with judo and athletics, as well as various other sporting disciplines proving popular amongst supporters of the host and commonwealth nations.

The popularity of judo amongst the host-nation supporters is due to the Glasgow European Open, which took place in October 2013. The event was the largest judo tournament held in Scotland to date, however, this was not the main aim of the event; it was to increase the popularity of judo with the Glasgow’s citizens, in the hope of increasing the number of people getting involved in the sport as well as to gain more supporters in the run-up to the Commonwealth Games.

=== European Championships 2015 ===
On 27 June 2013 the British Judo Association announced that Glasgow is to host the 2015 European Judo Championships.

It was the first time in 20 years the European Judo Union's biggest event of the Judo year was hosted in the United Kingdom, and is set to be held at the Emirates Arena.

Sport Minister Shona Robison said:

Securing the 2015 European Judo Championships is a fantastic achievement. Judo is going from strength to strength, with JudoScotland continuing to grow its membership and the National Training Centre at Ratho supporting more athletes and development programmes. Scotland is the perfect stage for events - judokas and spectators coming to Glasgow will receive a great welcome and an experience that will surprise and delight. The European Judo Championships now join other major championships, such as world gymnastics and orienteering events, coming to Scotland after next year's Commonwealth Games and the Ryder Cup.

Kerrith Brown, British Judo's current Chairman, hoped the Glasgow events would help further boost the sport's profile, with Gemma Gibbons (who now train's at JudoScotland's training centre in ratho) and Karina Bryant having won Olympic medals at London 2012. He said:

It is an honour to have been selected by the EJU to host their flagship event and I am extremely proud of what our bid team and partners have achieved. We are confident that this event will be something special and provide a showcase for European judo to the world, creating a legacy for Great Britain sitting on a par in judo terms with London 2012 and the 2014 Commonwealth Games.

=== European Veteran Championships 2018 ===
In 2018 the European Veteran Championships was held in Glasgow.

== See also ==
- Judo
- Judo in the United Kingdom
- List of judo organizations
