= Muhammad Ali: The Glory Years =

Book by Felix Dennis

First edition
- Author: Felix Dennis; Don Atyeo
- Language: English
- Genre: Biography
- Publisher: Ebury Press
- Publication date: 2002

Muhammad Ali: The Glory Years is a 2002 biography of Muhammad Ali co-authored by Felix Dennis and Don Atyeo. The book is described as a photo-rich biography focussing on Ali's boxing fights starting from the age of 12 to his retirement. The book is based upon the authors's interviews with Ali, and also interviews with Ali's friends, family, opponents, and trainers. The book's coverage of Ali's boxing matches has been praised while the chapter on Ali's fight with George Foreman has been described as "an absolute classic." According to a review in Mint, the book features "[s]ports writing at its best."
