= Kung-Fu Monthly =

UK music, fashion and culture magazine

- Kung-Fu Monthly issue 1 featuring Bruce Lee
- Editor: Felix Yen (pseudonym of Felix Dennis)
- Categories: Film, Martial Arts
- Frequency: Monthly
- Publisher: H Bunch Associates
- First issue: 1974
- Final issue: 1987
- Company: Dennis Publishing
- Country: United Kingdom
- Based in: London
- Language: English

Kung-Fu Monthly was a British magazine featuring articles and illustrations about the martial artist and actor, Bruce Lee. The magazine was created Felix Dennis, published in 17 countries and ran for 13 years.

== History ==
Capitalising on the success of the Bruce Lee film, Enter The Dragon, Dennis started publishing Kung-Fu Monthly in 1974 after noticing the rising popularity of martial arts and, in particular, Bruce Lee. After seeing people queuing up outside a cinema in Soho, Dennis later said 'I went into the film and saw all these boys cheering and all these girls going weak at the knees. I came out, went over to the office, and said "Right lads, we're going to do a Bruce Lee magazine."' It was an immediate commercial success, became the world's best-selling Bruce Lee magazine and according to Dennis made £60,000 in its first year.

Kung-Fu Monthly was published by Dennis's newly formed Dennis Publishing, but issued the magazine under the name of Dennis's other publishing company, H Bunch Associates. The magazine was Dennis Publishing's first magazine and ran for 13 years, producing 79 issues as well as 12 special edition books/magazines.

In 1975, Dennis licensed the magazine to be produced in 14 countries other than Great Britain, including the United States, Spain and Germany, although the issue numbers never equalled those of the British version; the American Kung-Fu Monthly, for example, ran to only 32 issues.

It was edited by Don Won Ton and the editor-in-chief was Felix Yen.

== Format ==
The magazine took the form of a poster-magazine, opening up from an approximately A4 page size (28.6 x 21.6 cm) into a large, approximately A1 size (85.8 x 57.2 cm) poster featuring an image of Bruce Lee.

== Artists ==
The magazine used the specially commissioned artwork of British illustrators Jeff Cummins and Paul Simmons

== Reprint ==
In 2021, Bruce Lee fan Carl Fox approached the original publishers of Kung Fu Monthly, Dennis Publishing, with the idea to digitally scan and reprint every issue of the magazine. Dennis Publishing agreed, and the new magazines would become the first reprints of the publication in forty years, under the title 'Kung Fu Monthly Archive' and collected together in two formats: a colour hardback edition and a black and white paperback edition. The reprinted series was produced in dimensions half-size of the original magazines and printed by Pit Wheel Press.
