= IGIZMO =

iGIZMO
- Editor: Ross Burridge
- Categories: Consumer Technology
- Frequency: Fortnightly
- Publisher: Dennis Publishing
- Total circulation: 101,785 (Jul-Sep 2008)
- Founded: 2008
- First issue: 11 March 2008
- Final issue: 5 July 2011
- Country: UK
- Language: English
- Website: Official UK site

iGIZMO was an online consumer technology magazine and website, published by Dennis Publishing. It covered gadgets, mobile phones, home entertainment, personal entertainment and gaming products, as well as general technology trends. Its tagline was 'Turned on to Technology', and was often abbreviated to 'iG' in editorial copy and end stops.

== Magazine ==
Using the Ceros platform to present a magazine format online, it included product reviews (presented as the 'Hot 3' section), interactive features (such as the regular 'Modern Classic' and 'FutureTech' pieces) and news (including a 'News in 90 Seconds' video). It combined text, high-resolution imagery (at 150dpi rather than the web's usual 72dpi), interactive Flash elements and video.

Launched on 11 March 2008, it was first audited in July 2008, with an ABCe (Audit Bureau of Circulations) result of 101,785. It was shortlisted for the "BSME Launch of the Year 2008", and subsequently won the "PPA Electronic Subscription of the Year 2008".

== Website ==
The iGIZMO website contained news, blogs and reviews sections, as well as a prominent ‘subscribe’ area for the magazine, and back issues of the same. It also contained video features, many of which have not appeared in the magazine.

== Final Issue ==
The magazine released its final issue on 5 July 2011. Articles from some issues can still be found when stumbled upon as a result from using a search engine. The free iGIZMO Magazine app for android can still be downloaded from iTunes although the last interactive issue was May 2012 (see iGIZMO Twitter site).
