= Willie Brydon =

Scotland international rugby union player

William R C Brydon
- Full name: William Ritchie Crawford Brydon
- Born: 6 November 1915 Edinburgh
- Died: 11 June 1980 (aged 64) Edinburgh, Scotland
- School: George Heriot's
- University: Edinburgh University
- Occupation(s): Civil Servant, Department of Agriculture & Fisheries Scotland

Rugby union career
- Position: Scrum-half
International career
Years	Team	Apps	(Points)
1939	Scotland	1	(0)

William Ritchie Crawford Brydon (6 November 1915 — 11 June 1980) was a Scottish international rugby union player.

Brydon was not a regular first XV player for his club Heriot's FP when he gained his solitary Scotland cap in the 1939 Home Nations. His club had favoured E. O. Kollien as their preferred scrum-half since 1935, but Brydon performed well opposite Kollien in the trials, in which he partnered well with fly-half Wilson Shaw. Both Brydon and Shaw were consequently picked as the half-back combination for Scotland's opening match against Wales in Cardiff.

In 1939, prior to the outbreak of the Second World war, he enlisted in the Lothians and Border Horse as a territorial soldier, on the outbreak of War in September 1939 he was called up full time. On 16th December 1939 Brydon played in a services' international alongside the founder of the SAS Paddy Mayne, for Scotland & Ireland v England & Wales at the Richmond Athletic Ground in London.

In 1940 the 1st Regiment Lothians and Border Horse were posted to France as part of the British Expeditionary Force. In June 1940 while serving as part of the 51st (Highland) Division, he was captured along with the entire Highland Division in St Valery-en-Caux and was held as a prisoner of war in Germany, latterly in Stalag 383 for 5 years until his liberation on 22nd April 1945. This captivity ended his rugby career.

== See also ==
- List of Scotland national rugby union players
