= Mandalay Estate, Mustique =

Balinese-style villa

Coordinates: 12.8791°N 61.1845°W

The Mandalay Estate is a 6.2-acre (2.5 ha), Balinese-style villa perched on the hills above Britannia Bay on the Caribbean island of Mustique in Saint Vincent and the Grenadines.

== The island ==
The late Colin Tennant, 3rd Baron Glenconner, bought the island in 1958 and created the idyllic destination of Mustique. In 1960 media attention rose when Lord Glenconner presented land to Princess Margaret as a wedding gift.

== David Bowie ==
The house was originally built as Britannia Bay House for the British singer and songwriter David Bowie in 1989 in collaboration with architect Arne Hasselqvist and the designer Robert Litwiller. Bowie desired a property as "unlike the Caribbean as possible".

At the centre of the villa is a koi pond with waterfalls and an infinity pool, surrounded by a series of Balinese pavilions. Bowie was fond of the villa's layout saying that "The thing about Mandalay is that it is broken up into little areas that you can get lost in". Bowie attributed his lack of being able to work there to the outstanding views from the villa, explaining that "The house is such a tranquil place that I have absolutely no motivation to write things when I'm there".

== Felix Dennis ==
In 1994 Bowie sold the estate for 5m U.S. dollars to business tycoon and poet Felix Dennis who renamed the villa Mandalay. Dennis was keen to preserve the villa as Bowie had intended Dennis wrote Island Dreams – 99 poems from Mustique at the house. Dennis spent five months of the year on the island and wrote some of his most popular poetry there. Inspired by the scene as the sun goes down from Mandalay, Dennis wrote:

"A ball of fire is spilling in the sea
The empty sky flamingo-pink and grey
Cicada songs creak out the end of day
A choir of tree-frogs whistle: 'Come to me!'"

Dennis worked with the government of St Vincent and the Grenadines to give each of the 12,500 secondary school children a laptop in 2014.

== Present day ==
After the death of Felix Dennis in June 2014, the Mandalay Estate was put up for sale and sold to entrepreneur Simon Dolan. The villa has five bedrooms including one in what was once David Bowie's recording studio and another in the Writers Cottage where Felix Dennis wrote his poetry.
