= Ed Needham =

Journalist

Ed Needham is an editor in journalism.

Salon.com, The Guardian, and the Los Angeles Times criticized Needham's 2002 appointment as editor of Rolling Stone as likely to end the high quality journalism for which the magazine was known and replace it with lad mag marketing from Needham's past magazines. The Hartford Courant remarked that Rolling Stone founder Jann Wenner had great hopes for Needham.

Needham noted that magazine covers featuring women outsold those which featured men. For the November 14, 2002 issue of Rolling Stone he presented Christina Aguilera naked with a tag line calling her a pop princess with a dirty mind. A 2021 Washington Post retrospective of magazines remarked that this kind of portrayal was not common before or after that era of publishing.

Needham stayed with Rolling Stone for about a year, after which in 2004 he became editor of Maxim

Needham was the launch editor of Coach, a free health and fitness magazine for men, predominantly distributed in London. Dennis Publishing invested £3million in the title and although it achieved a circulation of 300,704 the magazine closed after 14 months.

== Strong Words ==
In 2017 Needham began planning Strong Words, a literary magazine.

In a 2019 interview Needham discussed his past 18 months as editor of Strong Words, a literary review magazine.

In interviews around the year 2020 Needham discussed his past as a corporate executive but in the post-digital publishing market, solo management was a better fit.
