= Lovell Village, Saint Vincent and the Grenadines =

Lovell Village
- Location in Saint Vincent and the Grenadines
- Coordinates: 12°52′57″N 061°11′16″W
- Country: Saint Vincent and the Grenadines
- Island: Mustique
- Parish: Grenadines

Lovell Village is a town located on the island of Mustique, which is part of the Grenadines island chain. It is part of Saint Vincent and the Grenadines and is an administrative area of the country. Ferry service from St. Vincent is available.

The settlement of Lovell was built in 1964. The original inhabitants of the island were each given a plot of land and a new home in this location. By that time, Mustique was owned by The Hon. Colin Tennant, who became The 3rd Baron Glenconner in 1983.

Most of the island locals, (roughly 500 people), who work in Mustique, still live in Lovell and for years, have been served by a church, school, restaurant, a medical clinic, a store and a police station. A May 2019 report indicates that other businesses are now located in the Lovell area: "a seafood market ... a food market, two stores The Purple House and The Pink House ... and a general store that advertised liquor, wine and cigars". Serving locals and some tourists, a view restaurant and bar are located in Lovell.

== See also ==
- Saint Vincent and the Grenadines
