= Mustique =

Island in St Vincent and the Grenadines

Mustique Island
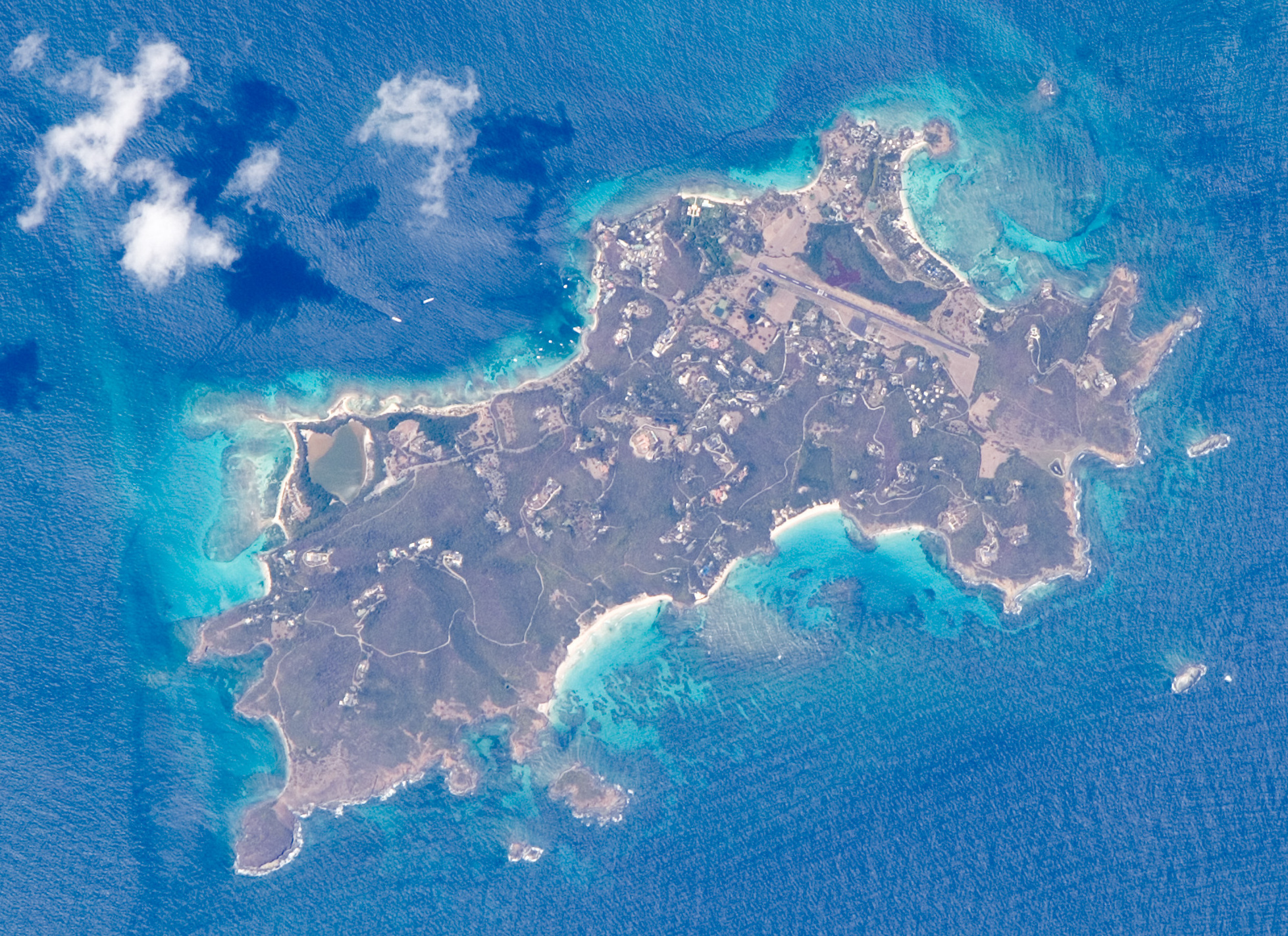
- Mustique Island, Grenadines

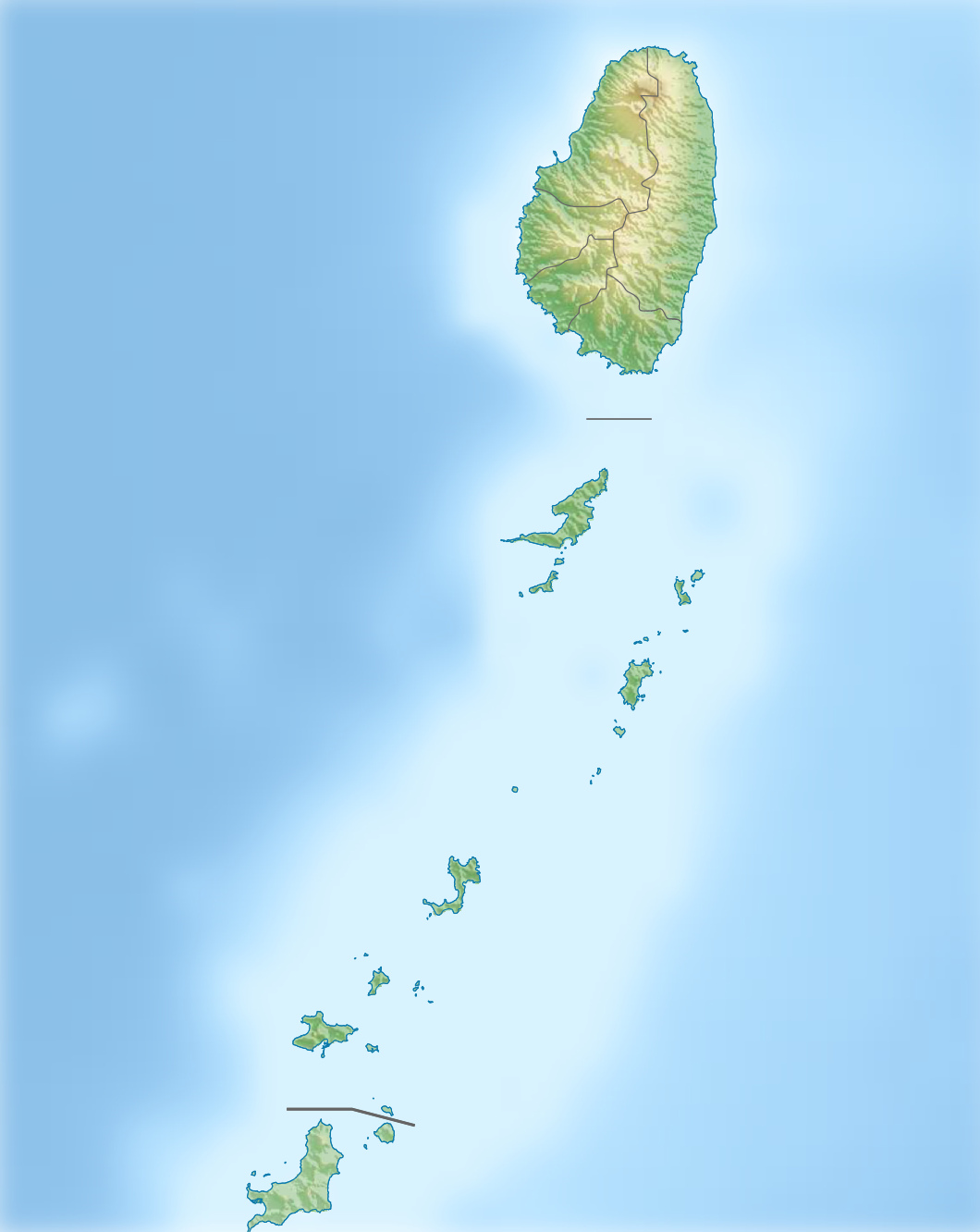
- Location within Saint Vincent and the Grenadines Location within Lesser Antilles Location within the Caribbean

Geography
- Location: Caribbean
- Coordinates: 12°52′N 61°11′W
- Area: 5.7 km^{2} (2.2 sq mi)

Administration
- Saint Vincent and the Grenadines
- Owner: The Mustique Company

Demographics
- Population: Total 500; Peak Season 1,300

Additional information
- Time zone: Atlantic Standard Time (UTC-4)
  - Summer (DST): Atlantic Daylight Time (UTC-3)
- Official website: Mustique Island

Mustique (/mʌˈstiːk/) is a 2,470 hectares (6,100 acres) private island in Saint Vincent and the Grenadines. It is part of the Grenadines, a chain of islands in the West Indies. The island is located within Grenadines Parish, and the closest island is the uninhabited Petite Mustique, located 2 km (1.2 mi) to the south.

The island's year-round population of about 500 live mostly in the villages of Lovell, Britannia Bay and Dovers. The population rises to 1,200 in peak season. Ferry service is provided to the island from Saint Vincent on the M/V Endeavour. The island is also accessible via Mustique Airport.

Mustique is most commonly nicknamed "The Millionaire's Island" due to its high concentration of ultra-wealthy homeowners and exclusive, multi-million-dollar beachside villas. It is popular amongst celebrities and British royals.

The island is owned by the Mustique Company, a private limited company, which is in turn owned by the island's homeowners. The island has about 120 private villas, many of which are let through the Mustique Company. The company also owns a hotel and café on the island.

== Environment ==
Mustique has several coral reefs. The land fauna includes tortoises, herons, iguanas and many other species. The island has been designated an Important Bird Area (IBA) by BirdLife International because it supports significant populations of lesser Antillean swifts, green-throated caribs, Antillean crested hummingbirds, brown pelicans, Cabot's and royal terns, Grenada flycatchers, Saint Vincent tanagers and lesser Antillean bullfinches. The snake Barbour's tropical racer, as well as two lizards – the green ameiva and bronze anole – inhabit the island. Hawksbill and leatherback sea turtles nest on the beaches.

== Early history ==
The islands were originally inhabited by Indigenous peoples who probably arrived from South America around 2500 BC, subsequently by the "Arawaks" from 250 BC to 1000 AD, and later by the "Caribs", whose simple tools can still be found.

The history of European settlement of the island of Mustique, and of the Grenadines in general, dates back to the 15th century, when Spanish navigators first sighted this more-or-less linear group of small rocky islands and named them "Los Pájaros" or "the birds", because they resembled a small flock scattered across the sea. During the seventeenth century the islands were renamed the Grenadines by pirates, who used the sheltered bays to hide their ships and loot. The indigenous people were soon outnumbered by European planters in the 1740s, who found they could grow sugar there in abundance, using enslaved Africans to provide labour. Because Europe's only sources of sugar at that time were limited quantities from the Canaries and Cyprus, the West Indies became economically significant. The Grenadines passed from France to the British in 1763; farmers Alexander Campbell and John Aitcheson bought the island of Mustique that year. The British built three forts. Cotton and sugar continued to be grown until 1834.

The name Mustique comes from the French moustique, "mosquito". The sugar industry lasted until the 19th century, when the cultivation of European-grown sugar beet dramatically reduced the demand for tropical sugar. Mustique's seven plantations were abandoned and eventually swallowed up by scrub, leaving remnants, such as the sugar mill at "Endeavour" and its "Cotton House". The Plantation House was built in the 18th century.

The island was mostly abandoned in the 1800s, but in 1835 (after the abolition of slavery) two plantations were reopened after ownership of the island passed to the Hazell family. They grew crops and raised sheep and goats. They also maintained a school for the island locals. In 1865 the two plantations were merged into one estate by the family.

== Later history ==
Mustique was purchased from the Hazell family in 1958 for £45,000 by Colin Tennant, who became the 3rd Baron Glenconner in 1983. He initially planned to start farming, "sea island cotton, beef and mutton" but then decided to develop the island into an exclusive hideaway, after forming The Mustique Company in 1968. By that time, cotton production was failing.

A report details the state of the island in 1958:

Apart from the villagers' smallholdings, Mustique was a desolate island covered in jungle, scrub and cactus. It had no natural water, no roads, no jetty for landing a boat and millions of mosquitoes. There was one dilapidated building used for picking over the cotton, and the remaining villagers lived in corrugated tin shacks which desperately needed upgrading.

Significant improvements were made over the subsequent years. According to a 2018 report, "since the 1960s, Mustique has been an exclusive sanctuary for royalty, rock stars, celebrities and heads of industry to relax in anonymity".

In 1960, Princess Margaret, the sister of Queen Elizabeth II, accepted as a wedding present Colin Tennant's gift of a 4 ha (10 acres) plot of land, where she built a villa called Les Jolies Eaux. She spent time on the island during her honeymoon. In the early 1970s, the princess often visited the island in the company of Roddy Llewellyn. Mustique, she said, "is the only place I can relax". Before her death, the princess gave the property to her son David Armstrong-Jones, Viscount Linley to avoid later payment of inheritance tax. He sold it in 1999 for a reported £2.4 million and Les Jolies Eaux was made available for rent.

In 1964, a new settlement was built, Lovell Village. The original inhabitants of the island were each given a plot of land and a new home in this location. Most of the island locals, who work in Mustique, (roughly 500 people) live in Lovell and for years were served by a church, school, restaurant, a medical clinic, a store and a police station. A May 2019 report indicates that other businesses are now located in the Lovell area: "a seafood market ... a food market, two stores The Purple House and The Pink House ... and a general store that advertised liquor, wine and cigars".

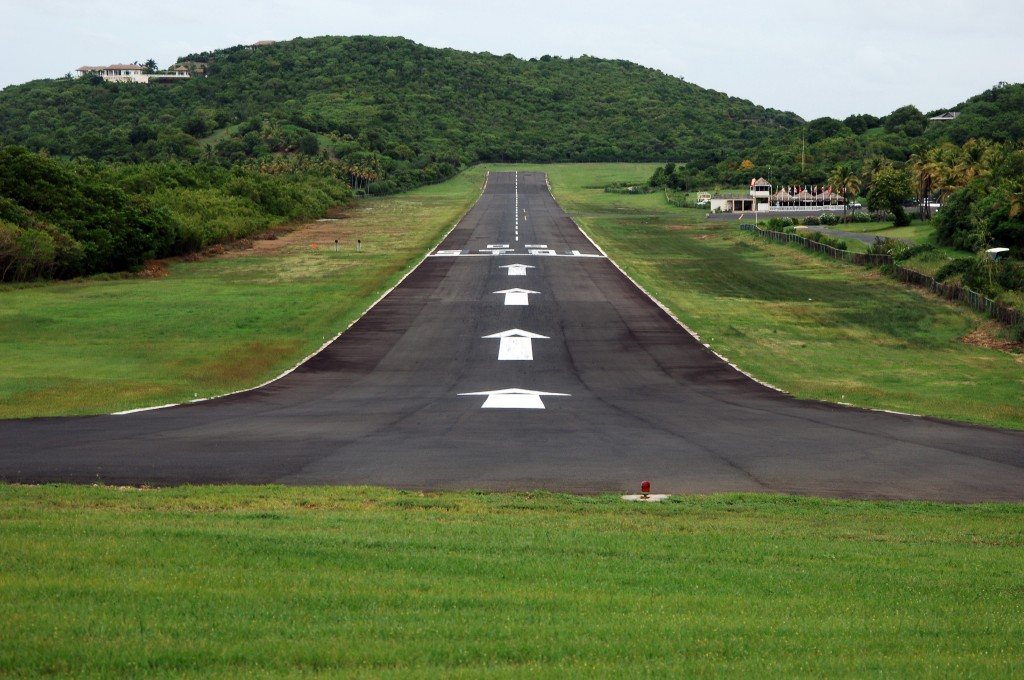
Mustique Airport

When The Mustique Company was formed in 1968, its new manager Hugo Money-Coutts obtained import and other tax free status in return for an annual fee. Building and sales of the villas started soon afterwards.

The airport began operation in 1969. In that year, several new villas were built, and the Cotton House opened as a hotel. In the following years, roads were built (although golf carts and ATVs are the only powered mode of transport), electricity and communications became reliable, a desalination plant was built to provide potable water, and a medical clinic was opened. The costs of running the island school and medical facility are supported by an educational and medical trust. One report states that "since 1968, more than $100 million has been invested in Mustique".

In 1971, the SS Antilles, referred to locally as the Antilles packboat, struck a reef not far off of the island and sank.

=== New ownership and development ===
In 1976, due to financial problems, Tennant sold a controlling interest (60%) in The Mustique Company to Venezuelan industrialists Hans Neumann and Alberto Vollmer Herrera. Neumann, a Czech national, led the operations for the consortium, while Vollmer provided financial backing. Having taken control of the island, Neumann appointed Brian Alexander in 1979 to take over the management of the Mustique Company. Alexander did not retire until August 2008. During Alexander's tenure, homes were built for workers on the island.

Tennant remained the owner of a plot on the island until moving to Saint Lucia in 1992. However, by 1987, Tennant had sold his remaining shares of The Mustique Company to Hans Neumann. After 2007, major improvements were made on the island including a desalination plant, solar panels to provide electricity and the recycling of certain types of refuse.

In 1988 Hans Neumann set up the ownership structure as it is today and Mustique Island was transformed into a private limited company with the 104 homeowners as minority shareholders. Until 2003, Hans Neumann followed by his daughter Ariana Neumann retained a seat on the board and a block of 30% of the shares, which continued to provide stability over the years as it prevented dramatic policy shifts or substantial deviations from the development plan.

As of 2019, The Mustique Company is managed by Roger Pritchard, who replaced Brian Alexander. He leads a staff of 450 who oversee every aspect of island life, management of the villas and security. The security and fire services are provided by a team of officers led by a former Scotland Yard chief. Every visitor must be registered with the security force.

The Mustique Charitable Foundation has been funding programmes for the island locals, such as scholarships, arranging for surgeons to visit the island and literacy programmes since 2018. The Mustique Charitable Trusts funds projects such as Disaster Management Education, refurbishment of the Milton Cato Memorial Hospital in Saint Vincent, school meal programmes, some literacy projects and after-school programmes, diabetes and hypertension screening, a hospice and tree planting.

== Amenities and activities ==
Mustique Island has many notable features.

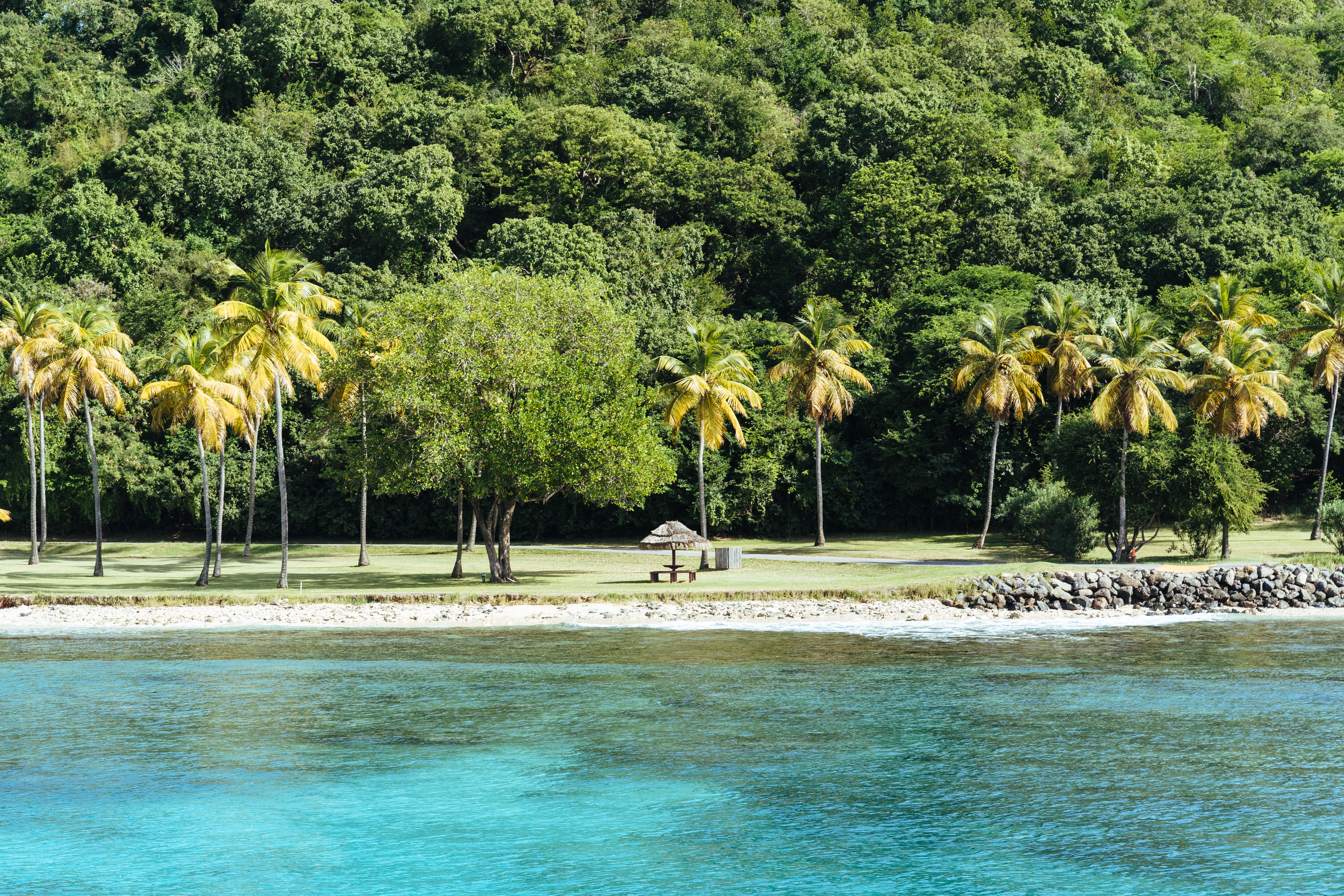
Beach on the western side of the island

The primary beach is Macaroni on the Atlantic side; large waves make it more suitable for surfing than for swimming. Lagoon Beach on the west side is calmer "but too shallow and seaweedy for swimming" according to one review. Gelliceaux, a sheltered bay, is preferable for swimming.

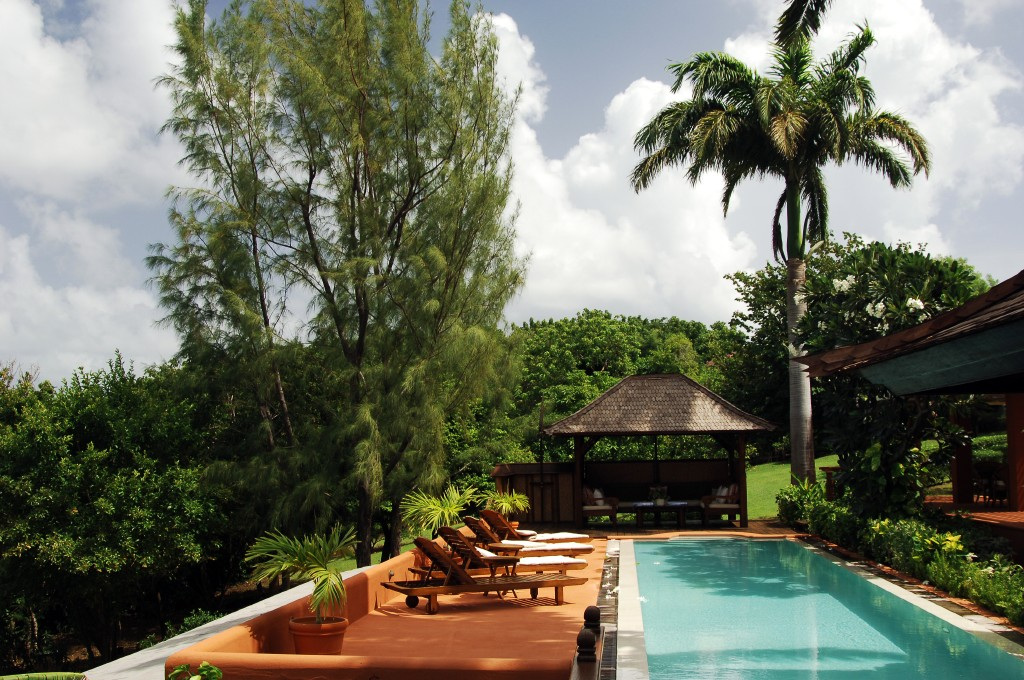
A villa in Mustique

Villas for rent (from $8,000 for one bedroom to $150,000 per week for 6+ bedrooms) include the royals' Les Jolies Eaux, the Indonesian-style Mandalay (built for David Bowie), Pangolin, a seven-bedroom Balinese home, Toucan Hill with its Moroccan theme and a "travertine-like palace". Boats can be chartered at Endeavor Bay.

The Mustique Medical Clinic is open daily and there is an island pharmacy. In case of serious medical issues, evacuation can be arranged to Martinique or Miami.

== Residents and guests ==
The island was historically home to fishermen. From the 1960s, its visitors began to include a group whose influence created its current cachet: Lord Glenconner, Oliver Messel, Princess Margaret, Tommy Hilfiger and Mick Jagger. Queen Elizabeth II and Prince Philip, Duke of Edinburgh, made private visits to Mustique in 1966, 1977 and 1985. William, Prince of Wales and Catherine, Princess of Wales, holiday in Mustique often.

David Bowie once owned an Indonesian-inspired multi-pavilion villa on the island, which he called Britannia Bay. However, he stopped visiting it, saying that "the house was so tranquil and peaceful that he found it hard to get any work done." In 1994, Bowie sold the property for $5 million to business tycoon and poet Felix Dennis. After Dennis died in June 2014, the villa was renamed as the Mandalay Estate, and sold to entrepreneur Simon Dolan. In 1996, while on holiday at Mustique, Noel Gallagher wrote and demoed many of the songs that would later be released on the Oasis album Be Here Now (1997).

Then Prime Minister of the United Kingdom Boris Johnson and his girlfriend Carrie Symonds spent Christmas 2019 on Mustique with the Bismarck family. Other people who have holidayed on Mustique over the years include Liam Gallagher, Johnny Depp, Kate Moss, Paul McCartney, Jon Bon Jovi, Peter Lynch, Denzel Washington, Pierre Lagrange, Tom Ford, John Travolta and Bryan Adams.
