= Trevor Leggett =

Martial artist and author

- Born: 22 August 1914; London, United Kingdom
- Died: 2 August 2000 (aged 85); London, United Kingdom; Stroke
- Other names: T.P.
- Style: Judo
- Teacher: Yukio Tani
- Rank: 6th dan judo

Trevor Pryce Leggett (22 August 1914 – 2 August 2000)^{[a]} was a British judo teacher, author, translator, and head of the BBC's Japanese Service for 24 years. He was one of the first Europeans to study martial arts in Japan. Leggett served in the Ministry of Information during World War II. After the war, he taught judo at the Budokwai and worked in Japanese language services at the BBC. He held the title of Shihan, and the rank of 6th dan in judo from the Kodokan. Leggett helped introduce Japanese culture to the United Kingdom, and was honoured for this by being inducted into Japan's Order of the Sacred Treasure in 1984. He also produced many works on Eastern philosophy.

== Early life ==
Leggett was born on 22 August 1914 in Brondesbury, northwestern London, in the United Kingdom. He was the third son of Ernest Lewis Leggett, a professional violinist who had come from a farming family, and Isobel Mabel Leggett (née Pryce), a nurse from an affluent Scottish family. E. Leggett had been a child prodigy, and was an orchestral leader under conductor Sir Thomas Beecham. Since his father did not approve of his interest in the martial arts, Leggett had to begin practising judo in secret. Sir Leslie Glass, recalling Leggett's account of his own youth, said that "Trevor was a tall, rather gangling figure. He told me he had been outsize at school and bullied. He had taken up judo to work out the resentment which had built up inside him" (p. 328).

== Judo training ==
Leggett joined the Budokwai in London in 1932, training primarily under Yukio Tani, who would have a profound influence on the young man. Biographers Anthony Dunne and Richard Bowen (2003) relate that on one occasion, Leggett "looked in at the Budokwai, but, feeling a bit off colour and deciding not to train, walked away. He met Tani who asked where he was going. Responding to the five feet three-inch Tani, Leggett said, 'Well, you know, I thought I'd give the training a miss tonight. I'm a bit off colour and a rest will do me good.' 'Now, Leggett San, if a man with evil intent rushes up to you in the street with a hammer, what are you going to say? I'm sorry but I don't feel too good. Can you attack me next week?' Leggett turned on his heel and went back to the Budokwai. It was incidents of this nature, and there were a number, which made a major contribution to his steely self-control and determination" (p. 325).

During his time at the Budokwai, Leggett was promoted through the ranks to 1st dan, 2nd dan, and 3rd dan. He also studied law at university, graduating with a degree from the University of London in 1934. In 1936, he met Hari Prasad Shastri, a teacher of Adhyatma Yoga who, like Tani, would have a significant impact on him. Shastri became his teacher of yoga and its philosophy. He went to Japan in 1938, and continued his studies in judo. He received his 4th dan, 5th dan, and 6th dan promotions from the Kodokan. Leggett recounted that judo was rougher and more dangerous as practised before World War II than after the war.

== World War II ==
When World War II began in Europe, Leggett was attached to the British Embassy in Tokyo. When Japan entered the war in 1941, he was interned along with the other embassy staff. While confined with his fellow Britons, Leggett abstained from alcohol—unlike many of his colleagues—which reflected his ascetic character. He managed to continue his judo training with his Japanese guards. During his time in Japan, continuing his study of philosophy, he had also received instruction at a Buddhist monastery.

In the second half of 1942, the detainees were exchanged for staff of the Japanese Embassy in London. Leggett joined the Ministry of Information and attended a Japanese language refresher course at the School of Oriental and African Studies. Given his degree of fluency, he received private classes with renowned academic Arthur Waley. During the remainder of the war, Leggett served in India. He held the rank of Major in the Ministry of Information's Far Eastern Division, which later merged with the Psychological Warfare Division. At the end of the war, he returned to London.

== Post-war career ==
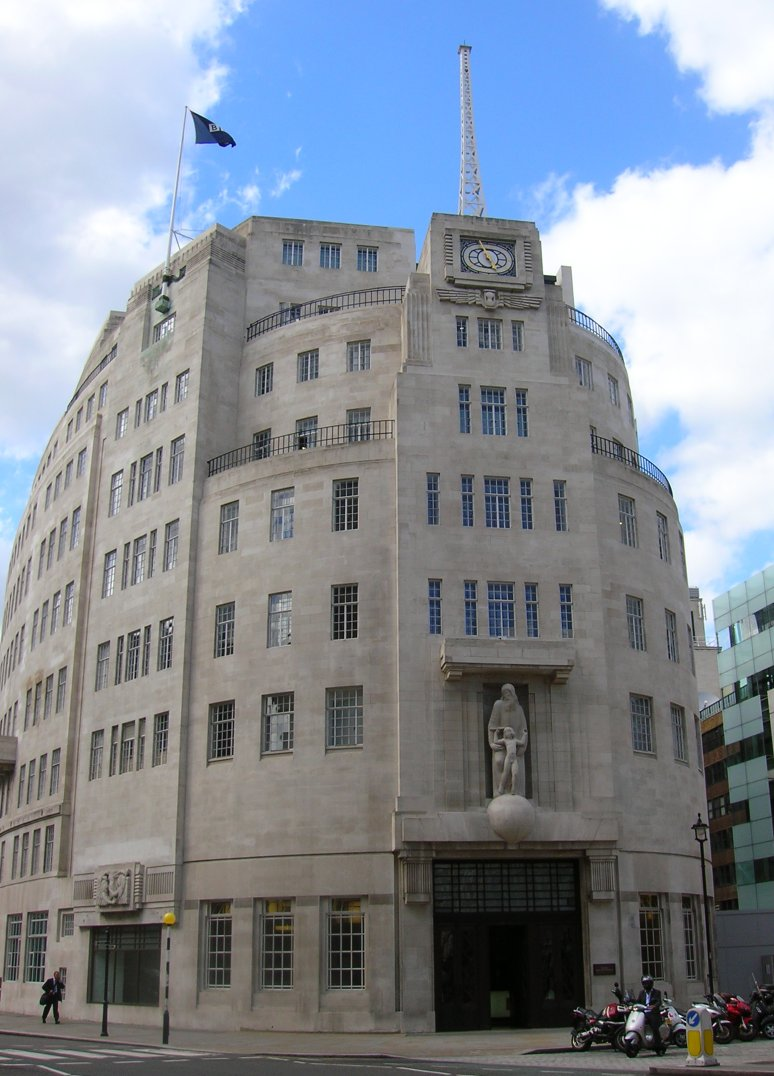
Leggett worked in Japanese language services at the BBC for more than 20 years, becoming a well-respected colleague

Leggett had begun teaching judo at the Budokwai in 1945, and the next year joined the external services of the BBC as Japanese editor of the Far Eastern section. He became programme organiser of the BBC's Japanese Section in 1950. In 1954, he was made a senior instructor at the Budokwai. During the 1950s, he helped 16 British judo practitioners travel to Japan to advance their training, and also arranged for Japanese practitioners to visit the UK.

During his time teaching in the Budokwai, Leggett held a two-hour class every Sunday afternoon. Attendance was by invitation only, and was restricted to those holding brown belt rank or above. Leggett's student, Syd Hoare (2000), claimed that "Virtually all the key figures of British judo graduated from this class." Leggett also held a resuscitation class once each year. In these classes, students would pair up and take turns strangling their partners to unconsciousness, and then reviving them under his supervision.

"[The Renshuden] was started in 1959 by Trevor Leggett, who saw the need for a dojo that would focus exclusively on people who were training for competition judo, which was then becoming increasingly important. [The Budokwai and the Renshuden] lived in a weird symbiosis, sharing top Japanese teachers...while members trained together at either location and then competed against each other with startling ferocity, most famously at the annual shows staged by the Budokwai at the Albert Hall."

In 1964, Leggett abruptly stopped teaching judo. He had apparently decided he had done enough in this sphere, and began writing books about judo, budo, Eastern philosophy, and Zen Buddhism. He held the rank of 5th dan in shogi (Japanese chess) and wrote books on this topic as well. His 1966 book Shogi: Japan's Game of Strategy was the work through which George F. Hodges became interested in shogi; Hodges later became a major promoter of the game in Europe. Leggett remained with the BBC until he retired in 1969. He was remembered as a courteous and kindly colleague, well respected for his extensive knowledge of Japan.

Leggett published over 30 books, including A first Zen reader (1960/1982), Samurai Zen: The warrior koans (1985/2003), and Three ages of Zen (1993). Dunne and Bowen (2003) assert that Leggett's greatest literary contribution was, however, the translation of a (then) newly discovered Sanskrit commentary from around AD 700. This endeavour took him 17 years.

On 3 May 1984, Leggett was awarded the Order of the Sacred Treasure, 3rd Class (Gold Rays with Neck Ribbon), by the Japanese government for his services in introducing Japanese culture to the UK. In 1987, he received the All-Japan Buddhist Association Literary Award for Translations of Japanese.

== Later life ==
In his later years, Leggett lectured on philosophy at the Buddhist Society (where he was a regular lecturer), the Theosophy Society, and other institutions. He was dismayed by the direction judo had taken, seeing it as a chase for medals. Through the 1980s and 1990s, his writings focused on philosophy rather than judo. Despite having severely impaired eyesight from his advanced age, he was still working on his next book during his final days.

Leggett died of a stroke in the early morning on 2 August 2000 at St Mary's Hospital, London. His funeral was held on the morning of 11 August 2000 at the Mortlake Crematorium. One of his Japanese friends once described him as "more Japanese than the Japanese"—his adherence to Japanese culture extended even to wearing the fundoshi, the loincloth worn only by the most traditional Japanese men. Hoare (2000) wrote: "It is no exaggeration to say that one of the great figures of world judo has passed away."

== See also ==
- Judo in the United Kingdom
- Gunji Koizumi

== Notes ==
a. Different sources give Leggett's date of birth as either 22 August or 27 August.
