= Bizarre (magazine) =

British magazine (1997–2015)

- Cover of the first issue (February 1997)
- Editor: David McComb
- Categories: Lifestyle magazine; Fetish magazine
- Frequency: Every four weeks
- Circulation: 11,603 (ABC July–December 2013) (print and digital editions)
- First issue: February 1997
- Final issue: February 2015
- Company: Dennis Publishing
- Country: United Kingdom
- Language: English

Bizarre was a British alternative magazine launched by Fiona Jerome in 1997 and was published from 1997 to 2015. It was originally published by John Brown Publishing, but after IFG collapsed Dennis Publishing took over Publication. Bizzare was a sister publication to Fortean Times.

== History ==
Bizarre was launched as a bimonthly title by John Brown Publishing in February 1997 and was edited by Fiona Jerome. It was an immediate success and changed to monthly issuance a year after its launch. Circulation peaked at more than 120,000 in 2000, but later the same year declined to less than 30,000 when I Feel Good (IFG) bought the magazine for £5 million. IFG was a company founded by James Brown, the former editor of Loaded magazine. When IFG collapsed, Dennis Publishing acquired Bizarre. The editor of Bizarre became David McComb in December 2013. Bizarre announced the end of publication in early 2015, with the January issue, published on 20 January, being its last.

On 28 February 2020, it was announced, via the magazine's social media pages, that Bizarre was in the early stages of making its return, both physically and online, under entirely new ownership. To date, no further details have been announced regarding the magazine's reboot.

== Content ==
Bizarre covered alternative culture through interviews with counterculture personages, and articles about the Occult, LGBT culture and drug, fetish and other subcultures. It also reviewed the work of avant-garde directors, musicians, authors and visual artists.

The magazine's news coverage included unusual news events from around the world; development and impact of legislation concerning censorship, civil liberties, sex offences and occasionally, incidents of human rights abuses. Articles in Bizarre examined the Manchester police's Operation Spanner of 1987, Regulation of Investigatory Powers Act 2000, British legislation banning "extreme pornography" and the Terrorism Act 2000. After the murder of Sophie Lancaster in 2007, Bizarre campaigned for awareness of bigotry against people who exhibit some form of cultural deviance.

Like lad mags, issues of Bizarre commonly featured a semi-nude female model on the front cover and reviews of weird gadgets, films, music and websites. Earlier issues of Bizarre included a sealed section featuring censored pornography, in which images of anuses, genitalia, semen and sex acts were obscured. The censorship was self-imposed to avoid alienating mainstream newsagent's shops and booksellers.
