= Percy Sekine =

British judoka

Percy Sekine (born 20 February 1920 in London, died on 15 October 2010) was a distinguished sensei of the Hammersmith, London based Judokan. He represented Great Britain in international judo tournaments four times in the 1940s and 1950s, and was never beaten. He was also a coach of the British national judo team. His wife Hana was the daughter of Gunji Koizumi.

During the Second World War he served in the RAF and was shot down over the Netherlands in the winter of 1942. He was taken prisoner and sent to Stalag 383 in Bavaria. While there he formed a judo club and taught fellow prisoners who in turn taught others when Sekine was moved to another camp.

== See also ==
- European Judo Championships
- History of martial arts
- List of judo techniques
- List of judoka
- Martial arts timeline
