= Dorsington =

Village in Warwickshire, England

Coordinates: 52°8′44″N 1°48′31″W

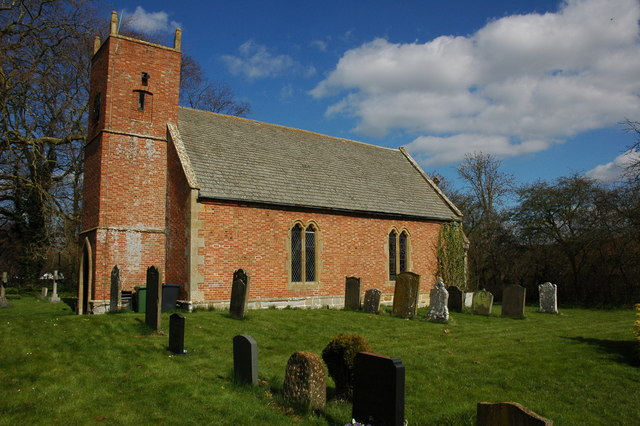
- St Peter's Church, Dorsington

- Location within Warwickshire
- Population: 150 (2011)
- Civil parish: Dorsington
- District: Stratford-on-Avon
- Shire county: Warwickshire
- Region: West Midlands
- Country: England
- Sovereign state: United Kingdom
- Post town: Stratford-upon-Avon
- Postcode district: CV37
- Dialling code: 01789
- UK Parliament: Stratford-on-Avon

Dorsington is a village and civil parish in the Stratford-on-Avon district, in the county of Warwickshire, England. Dorsington was in Gloucestershire until 1931, when it was transferred to Warwickshire. It is located 2¾ miles west of Milcote railway station. The place-name 'Dorsington' is first attested in an Anglo-Saxon charter of 710, where it appears as Dorsintone. It is recorded in the Domesday Book of 1086 as Dorsintune. The name means 'the town or settlement of Deorsige's people'. In the 2001 census, it had a population of 138 (64 males; 74 females; living in 49 houses). By the 2011 Census, the population had increased to 150. The parish church of St Peter's is a Grade II* listed building built in 1764–1768. Dorsington was the original centre of the Heart of England Forest, begun by the businessman and philanthropist Felix Dennis.

== Sources ==
Jonathan., Reinarz, (1996). A History of Dorsington. Lane, Joan. London: Noctua. ISBN 0-952-83850-8
