= Sarah Mayer =

British actor and judoka (1896–1957)

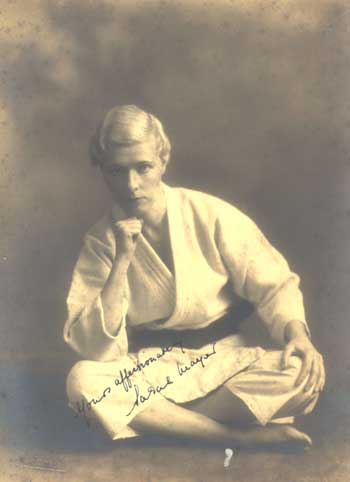
- Mayer in her Judo Uniform

Personal information
- Born: Sarah Winifred Benedict; 16 October 1896 London, England, United Kingdom
- Died: 19 March 1957 (aged 60) Barton-under-Needwood, England, United Kingdom
- Occupation: Judoka

Sport
- Sport: Judo
- Rank: Black belt belt
- Coached by: Gunji Koizumi; Kanō Jigorō

Sarah Winifred Benidict Mayer (née Benedict) (16 October 1896 – 19 March 1957) was an English actress and judoka. She was the first non-Japanese woman to obtain a blackbelt in judo.

== Biography ==
Mayer was born as Sarah Winifred Benedict Tapping near Battersea Park in London on 16 October 1896. Her father, Alfred Benedict Tapping was an actor and her mother, Alice Amelia Fishwick was an actress. The couple had three children, of which Mayer was the eldest.

Mayer went into acting herself in 1906, joining her parents' productions, and by 1914 she was performing in the West End in Harley Granville-Barker's interpretation of A Midsummer Night's Dream. She enrolled in the Academy of Dramatic Art soon after. Mayer first trained in judo by Gunji Koizumi at the Budokwai in the 1920s.

She married twice, first to timber merchant, Sills Keith Gibbons on 29 January 1919, and then to barrister Robert John (Robin) Mayer on 17 July 1924. She went travelling throughout 1934, initially to India and then east through China and Tibet to reach Japan. There she trained with the local police force, and took an interest in judo. She trained with Ichiro Hatta and reached first kyū. She was even presented first dan by Prince Nashimoto before returning home. In doing so, she became the first non-Japanese woman to obtain a black belt in judo on 23 February 1935. She had a match of judo between Nobuya Uchida, Minister of Railways (Japan) in Tokyo on 1 April, the judge was Kyuzo Mifune.

After her trip, her second marriage broke down and they divorced shortly after. Mayer met Warwick Parker Ovington, an RAF officer, after the war and in 1951 she took his surname. They lived together in Barton under Needwood, Staffordshire until her death, caused by alcohol dependence on 19 March 1957.
