= Syd Hoare =

English judoka (1939–2017)

Personal information
- Born: Sydney Reginald Hoare; 18 July 1939 Paddington, United Kingdom
- Died: 12 September 2017 (aged 78)
- Occupation: Judoka

Sport
- Sport: Judo
- Rank: 8th dan black belt
- Coached by: Trevor Leggett

Profile at external databases
- JudoInside.com: 4942

Syd Hoare (18 July 1939 – 12 September 2017) was an English judoka who competed for Great Britain in the 1964 Summer Olympics. Hoare was also a silver medalist in the 1965 European Judo Championships.

He is also often credited as the father of Sumo in the UK, after having taken the first team to Japan to compete in the 1980s

== Selected bibliography ==
- Hoare, Syd (1980). Judo (1st ed.). United Kingdom: Teach Yourself Books. ISBN 978-0-84-423926-2. (2nd ed. 1993)
- Hoare, Syd (1982). Self Defence (1st ed.). United Kingdom: Teach Yourself Books. ISBN 978-0-34-026834-6.
- Hoare, Syd (1986). Keep Fit (1st ed.). United Kingdom: Teach Yourself Books. ISBN 978-0-34-037626-3.
- Hoare, Syd (1993). The A-Z of Judo. United Kingdom: Ippon Books. ISBN 978-1-87-457270-1.
- Hoare, Syd (2002). Judo Strategies. United Kingdom: Ippon Books. ISBN 978-1-87-457202-2.
- Hoare, Syd (2009). A History of Judo. United Kingdom: Yamagi Books. ISBN 978-0-95-604980-3.
- Hoare, Syd (2010). A Slow Boat to Yokohama: A Judo Odyssey. United Kingdom: Yamagi Books. ISBN 978-0-95-604981-0.
- Rashid, Abdul; Ellis, Henry; Hoare, Syd (2022). Kenshiro Abbe: The Forgotten Budoka. United Kingdom: Independently Published. ISBN 979-8-79-493584-4.
