= Gunji Koizumi =

Japanese judoka

- Born: 8 July 1885; Komatsuka Oaza, Ibaraki Prefecture, Japan
- Died: 15 April 1965 (aged 79); Putney, London, United Kingdom; Suicide
- Other names: G.K.
- Style: Judo
- Rank: 8th dan (Kodokan)

Other information
- Notable students: Charles Palmer; Sarah Mayer

Gunji Koizumi (小泉 軍治, Koizumi Gunji; 8 July 1885 – 15 April 1965), known affectionately by colleagues as G.K., was a Japanese master of judo who introduced this martial art to the United Kingdom, and came to be known as the 'Father of British Judo.' He was the founder of the Budokwai, a pioneering Japanese martial arts society in England. Koizumi helped establish the British Judo Association, and founded the European Judo Union. He held the rank of 8th dan in judo. Koizumi's apparent suicide in 1965 shocked the worldwide judo community.

== Early life ==
Koizumi was born on 8 July 1885 in the village of Komatsuka Oaza (around 20 miles north of Tokyo at that time; the entire area is now part of Inashiki, Ibaraki) in Ibaraki Prefecture, Japan. He was the younger son of a tenant farmer, Shukichi Koizumi, and his wife, Katsu. Koizumi had an elder brother, Chiyokichi, and a younger sister, Iku. In 1897, aged 12, Koizumi began training in the art of kendo at school. Koizumi also began learning English from a neighbour who had been to America.

As the younger son in the family, he had the options of starting his own farm or being adopted into a family without a male heir (a Japanese custom); he disliked both options. In July 1900, shortly before he turned 15, he left home to seek his fortune in Tokyo, where he enrolled as a trainee telegrapher under a government scheme. In 1901, he started practising jujutsu under Tago Nobushige at the Tenjin Shinyo-ryu. Once qualified as a telegrapher he worked for a while in Tokyo before taking a job on the railways in Korea. In 1904, he trained under Yamada Nobukatsu, a former samurai. By now, Koizumi had decided that he wanted to study electricity, and that the best place to do so was in the United States of America. He travelled through Shanghai, Hong Kong, Singapore, and India, working as he went. While in Singapore in 1905, he trained under Tsunejiro Akishima.

== United Kingdom ==
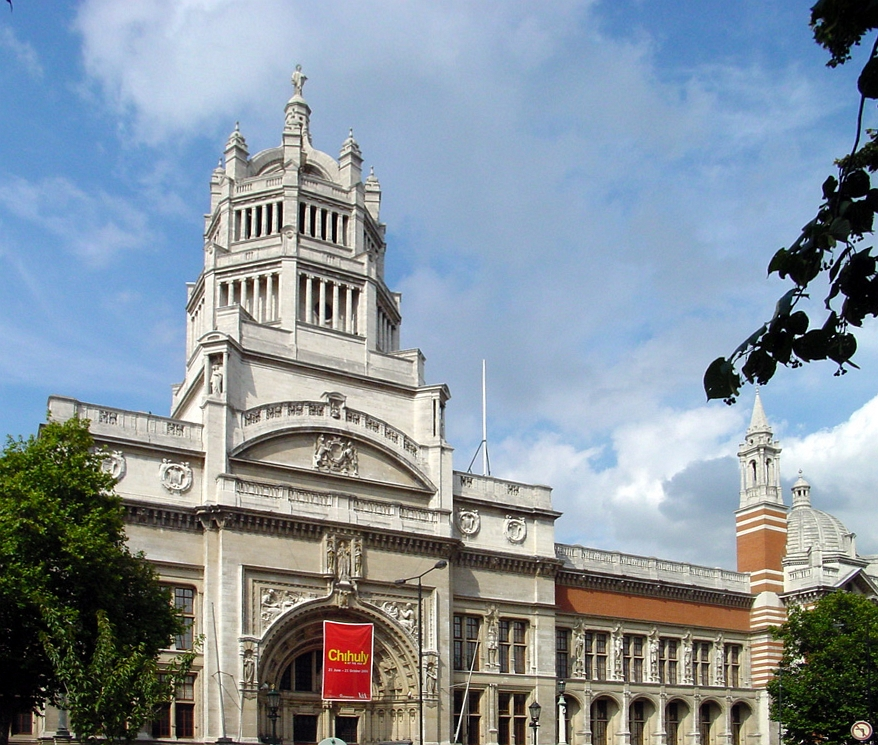
Apart from teaching judo, Koizumi was also a consultant to the Victoria and Albert Museum on Oriental lacquerware

On 4 May 1906, Koizumi arrived in Mostyn, North Wales, aboard the SS Romsford. He then travelled to Liverpool, where he took up the post of instructor at the Kara Ashikaga School of Jujitsu. He then travelled south to London, where he collaborated with former Bartitsu Club instructor Sadakazu Uyenishi, who was operating his own jujitsu school in Piccadilly Circus. During this period, Koizumi also taught jujitsu at the London Polytechnic and for the Royal Naval Volunteer Reserve. After several months, he set off for New York, arriving in May 1907. He secured work in the Newark Public Service Railway Company. After a few years, dissatisfied with life in the USA, he returned to England. He tried to start an electric lighting company in Vauxhall Road, London, but lacked sufficient funds. In January 1912, he set up a lacquer ware studio in Ebury Street, London.

In 1918, at his own expense, Koizumi established a society in London called the Budokwai (Way of Knighthood Society). The Budokwai offered tuition in jujutsu, kendo, and other Japanese arts to the British people. Koizumi secured a location in Lower Grosvenor Place, along the back wall of Buckingham Palace, and the Budokwai's premises opened on 26 January 1918.

In 1919, Koizumi helped establish the Kyosai Kai, a society that aimed to provide medical, employment, and housing assistance to Japanese people in England. Koizumi served as General Secretary of this organisation, which was based in the Budokwai's premises. In July 1920, Jigoro Kano, founder of the Kodokan, visited the Budokwai while on his way to the Olympic Games in Antwerp. After some discussion, Koizumi and Yukio Tani (another Budokwai instructor) agreed to change to the judo system, and Kano awarded them 2nd dan judo certifications.

In 1922, Koizumi, an expert in Oriental lacquerware, was appointed as a consultant to the Victoria and Albert Museum—and later catalogued the museum's entire lacquerware collection. Koizumi's book, Lacquer work: A practical exposition of the art of lacquering together with valuable notes for the collector, was published in 1923. In 1932, he was promoted to 4th dan in judo.

Through World War II, judo training continued at the Budokwai, but at great financial cost to Koizumi. Biographer Richard Bowen notes that, unusually, "Koizumi was not interned and indeed suffered no restrictions" during this time (p. 319). In 1947 Koizumi organized with his friend Mikinosuke Kawaishi the first ever-recorded Judo International tournament between two countries (UK and France) known as the Kawaishi Cup. In 1948, Koizumi was promoted to 6th dan in judo. He helped establish the British Judo Association on 24 July 1948. He served as the association's inaugural President. By the end of the decade, he had retired from business and had turned his full attention to teaching judo in the UK. In 1951, he attained the rank of 7th dan in judo.

Koizumi was married and had a daughter named Hana, who later married Percy Sekine, one of Koizumi's judo students.

== Later life ==
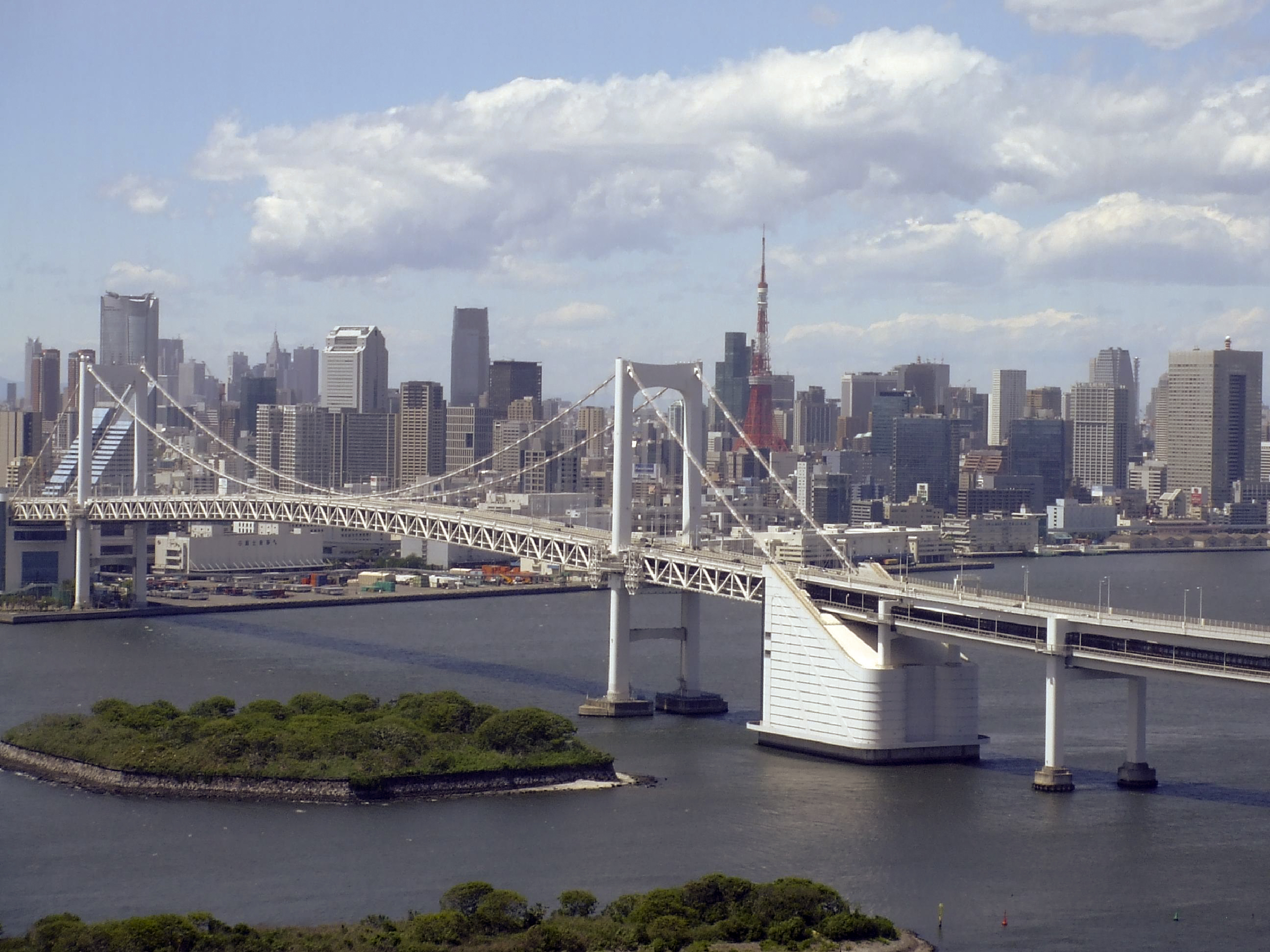
In the mid-1950s, Koizumi returned to the Tokyo area for the first time in half a century, finding a vastly different place than the farmlands he had left

On 19 September 1954, the Budokwai moved to new, larger premises; shortly after this, Koizumi returned to Japan for the first time in 50 years. His sister, relatives, and a Kodokan delegation led by its president, Risei Kano (one of Jigoro Kano's sons), received him at the airport. The Kodokan treated him as an honoured guest. After his visit, Koizumi returned to the UK, and continued promoting judo, with visits to many UK locations (including Derby Judo Club in 1958).

He toured the UK on a meagre budget, and gratefully, and very graciously, accepted accommodation, in Normanton, Derby, (at the Secretary's, (Brian Swain), small terraced house). Koizumi wrote some books on Judo, including Judo: The basic technical principles and exercises, supplemented with contest rules and grading syllabus (1958) and My study of Judo: The principles and the technical fundamentals (1960). He continued teaching judo throughout the early 1960s.

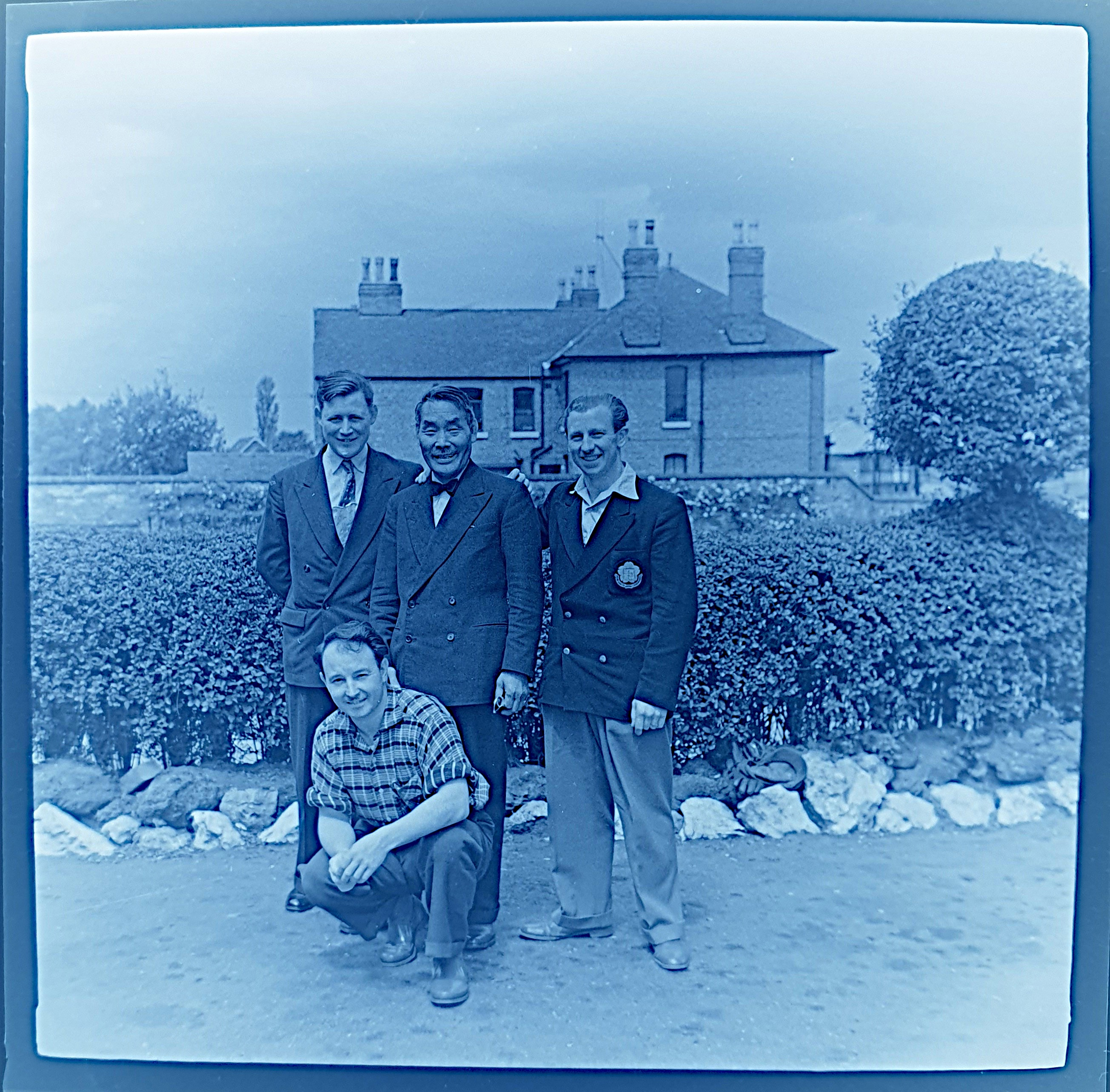
Gunji Koizumi, in 1958, with Derby Judo Club Members, including Brian Swain (right)

The night before Koizumi died, Charles Palmer (one of Koizumi's students) sensed that something was amiss—Black Belt magazine correspondent Kei Tsumura relates that "instead of his [Koizumi's] usual smiling 'good-night', he shook his [Palmer's] hand and said 'good-bye'" (p. 50). On 15 April 1965, Koizumi apparently died by suicide. He was found wearing his best suit, reportedly with a plastic bag over his head, sitting in his favourite chair beside the gas stove in his house at Putney. He left a very small estate valued at only £288.

Koizumi's death shocked the worldwide judo community, and caused much controversy. Some considered his suicide dishonourable, while others argued that his death mirrored those of honourable samurai. Grant (1965) indicated that he had been promoted to 8th dan before he died, but Fromm and Soames (1982) stated that the Kodokan promoted him to 8th dan posthumously.

== See also ==
- Judo in the United Kingdom
- Bartitsu
- Edward William Barton-Wright
- Kenshiro Abbe
- List of judoka
