= Stalag 383 =

- Hohenfels, Bavaria, Germany
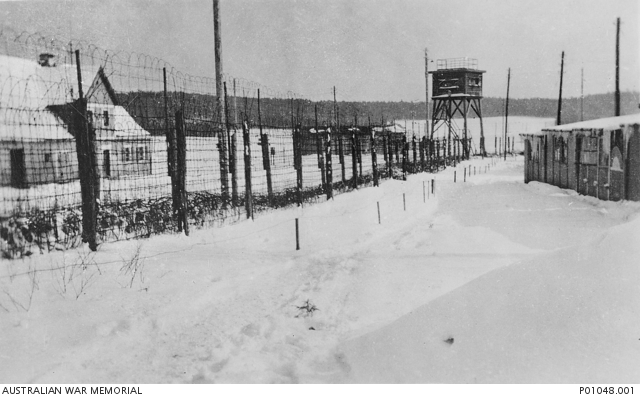
- Fencing and watchtower in the snow at Stalag 383, Hohenfels, Bavaria circa 1941

Site information
- Type: Prisoner-of-war camp
- Controlled by: Nazi Germany

Location
- (pre-war borders, 1937)
- Coordinates: 49°12′N 11°51′E

Site history
- In use: 1939–1945

Garrison information
- Occupants: Allied PoW

Stalag 383 was a German World War II Prisoner of War camp located in Hohenfels, Bavaria.

== History ==
The German Army founded a training area near Hohenfels, Bavaria in 1938. A troop camp for trainees, located in a high valley surrounded by dense woodland and hills at a homestead called 'Polnrich', was commandeered for use as a Prisoner of War camp in 1939. At first it was used for Allied NCOs and named Oflag IIIC but was later renamed Stalag 383 as it expanded with other ranks. The camp comprised 400 detached accommodation huts, 30 feet (9.1 m) x 14 feet (4.3 m), each typically housing 14 men. More were built towards the end of the war as prisoners were moved in from other camps as the Russian front advanced from the east. The name, Oflag III-C, was reassigned to a camp at Lübben (Spreewald) and operated between August 1940 and June 1942. On April 24, 1945, Major General Stanley Eric Reinhart's 65th Infantry Division captured Hohenfels. Major General Gustav Geiger, staff and guards surrendered. The prisoners, including many British and Colonial inmates, were liberated.

Later, between 1945 and 1949 the site became a displaced persons camp. The Americans subsequently retained the site and it doubled in size.

== Notable people ==
- Terry Frost (1915–2003), artist
- Adrian Heath (1920–1992), painter
- Percy Sekine (1920–2010), RAF pilot and prisoner in 1942

== See also ==
- List of German World War II POW camps
