= The First Post =

British news magazine (name from 2005–2014)

- Website type: News website
- Available in: English
- Owner: Dennis Publishing
- Creator: Mark Law
- Editor: Nigel Horne
- Commercial: Yes
- Launched: 2005; 21 years ago
- Current status: Operating as The Week (UK edition) since 2014

The First Post was a British daily online news magazine based in London. Launched in August 2005, it was sold to Dennis Publishing in 2008 and retitled The Week at the end of 2014. In its current format, it publishes news, current affairs, lifestyle, opinion, arts and sports pages, and features an online games arcade and a cinema featuring short films, virals, trailers and eyewitness news footage. There are also quick-read digests of the UK newspapers' news, opinion and sports pages.

== Contributors ==
The First Post has no discernible political bias. Regular writers have included the left wing Alexander Cockburn, commenting on US politics, and Sir Peregrine Worsthorne, generally perceived as a conservative, writing on UK and international issues. Contributors are based in a wide range of countries. The First Post was devised by Mark Law who was the editor until September 2009. It is edited by Nigel Horne, former editor of the Telegraph magazine.

In 2007, 15 Royal Navy Personnel were kidnapped by Iranian Special Forces. On their release, UK Secretary of State for Defence Des Browne granted permission for the 15 to sell their stories to The First Post. Senior members of the Royal Navy were troubled by this decision and contacted The First Post's defence correspondent, Robert Fox. The article Fox wrote was the first to alert the public to the disquiet within the Navy, and instigated coverage by the BBC radio programme Today.

== Moses Moyo ==
Moses Moyo is the pseudonym of an independent Zimbabwe-born journalist based in Harare, who reports exclusively for The First Post. In October 2007 documents leaked to Moyo by an operative in Zimbabwe's Central Intelligence Organisation uncovered a plot to assassinate former Catholic Archbishop of Bulawayo, Pius Ncube. This coverage forced Zimbabwe President Robert Mugabe to suspend attempts to silence critics of his regime.

== Chinese censorship ==
In March 2008, shortly before the Olympics were due to be staged in China, The First Post ran a story in which the head coach of China's badminton team admitted to match fixing at the 2004 Summer Olympics in Athens. Attempting to access this story from within China resulted in the user being redirected to an error page that simply read "The connection was reset". This is the same message that users attempting to access the BBC News website have encountered and is thought to be the result of state censorship by the Chinese via the Golden Shield Project.

== Design ==
The First Post initially had more the appearance of a print publication with a grid layout, and commissioned shorter pieces with the stated intention of avoiding scrolling. However, it has adopted scrolling-based text since its takeover by Dennis Publishing.

== Publishers ==
The First Post was initially backed by an investment group, The First Post News Group, which also publishes Zimbabwe Today, which carries personal accounts of life in the country under the Mugabe regime, and Media Circus, a student guide to getting and sustaining a career in the media. In January 2008, Dennis Publishing, publisher of The Week and a range of consumer print magazines, acquired The First Post for an undisclosed sum.

== Awards ==
The First Post was singled out for special commendation in the Best Editorial Team category of the 2007 Awards given by the Association of Online Publishers. The site also received a nomination for a Yellow Pencil Award for Outstanding Achievement in Viral / Animation & Motion Graphics at the D&AD Global Awards 2007 and was voted one of the "Top 50 Secret Websites" by PC Pro magazine (now Alphr).
