= Heart of England Forest =

UK charitable entity

Coordinates: 52.1553°N 1.8139°W

- Interactive map of Heart of England Forest
- Type: Forest
- Location: Warwickshire, England
- Nearest city: Bidford on Avon
- Area: 28 square kilometres (7,000 acres)
- Created: 2003
- Designer: Felix Dennis
- Operator: The Heart of England Forest Ltd.
- Website: heartofenglandforest.com

The Heart of England Forest is an English charity for the conservation and restoration of native habitats primarily within the counties of Warwickshire and Worcestershire. It aims to address the loss of ancient woodlands and other habitats in a region historically covered by the Forest of Arden, which has been substantially diminished due to extensive deforestation activities over the centuries.

The charity has planted over two million trees to help restore a variety of native woodland types for biodiversity and ecological resilience. In addition to reforestation, it also works to conserve existing ancient woodland sites and works to restore wetland and grassland habitats.

== Founding ==
The Heart of England Forest is based on the vision of Felix Dennis, a local landowner with a desire to reintegrate native woodland into the local landscape of Warwickshire. Dennis wished to establish a contiguous forest that would not only serve as an essential habitat for wildlife but also provide enjoyment and recreation for the public.

Dennis planted the first trees for the forest near his Dorsington home in 1996. In 2003, the initiative gained formal structure as a charity furthering forestation and Dennis's vision, and in 2013 planted its one millionth tree.

Following Felix Dennis's death in 2014, the charity has since expanded the forest to cover more than 7,000 acres (28 km^{2}), with a variety of habitats. These include 4,658 acres (18.85 km^{2}) of newly established forest with over 600 acres (2.4 km^{2}) mature, ancient woodland, preserving a vital part of the region's natural heritage. In 2022, the Heart of England Forest planted its 2 millionth tree.

== Educational Mission ==
In addition to forestry work, the charity also plays a role in education, with programs designed to teach children about the importance of forests, biodiversity, and wildlife conservation.

== Wildlife ==
The Heart of England Forest is a home to many species of wildlife. It exemplifies the success of the conservation efforts and the biodiversity of the restored habitats. Species include:

- Purple Emperor (Apatura iris)
- Great Crested Newt (Triturus cristatus): A species of newt, protected in the UK. They serve as a bioindicator.
- Common Buzzard (Buteo buteo)
- Barn Owl (Tyto alba): Conservation efforts ensure nesting sites and adequate food for this species.
- Eurasian Woodcock (Scolopax rusticola)
- Roe Deer (Capreolus capreolus)

== Tree Planting ==
The Heart of England Forest charity planted 120,000 native broadleaf trees from November 2022 to March 2023. Trees are planted by volunteers, with a current goal to reach a forest spanning 30,000 acres (120 km^{2}).

- English Oak (Quercus robur)
- Sessile Oak (Quercus petraea)
- Birch (Betula)
- Hazel (Corylus avellana)
- Hornbeam (Carpinus betulus)
- Alder (Alnus glutinosa)
- Rowan (Sorbus aucuparia)
- Field Maple (Acer campestre)

== See also ==
- Community Forests in England
- English Lowlands beech forests
