= Mark Law =

English journalist and author

Mark Alexander Law (born November 1944) is a British journalist and author, known for his book on Judo called The Pyjama Game, A Journey into Judo.

== Career ==
Law began his career as a reporter on Woodrow Wyatt's group of provincial papers before moving to London to work as a show business press agent for Theo Cowan representing major performers, producers and writers in film, theatre, television and music. He then joined the Milton Keynes Development Corporation as a publicist for the new city.

In the late-1970s, he worked as a sub editor on the Telegraph Magazine, later becoming a writer and commissioning editor before joining the Mail on Sunday as a feature writer, and later moving to The Times and then to The Daily Telegraph as a features editor. He was the comment editor of The Sunday Telegraph until September 2004. He is also a former columnist for The World of Judo.

=== The First Post ===
Law created and launched The First Post after being asked by a group of private investors led by the late Martin Finegold to create a publication for the UK and US which ranged from non-partisan comment pieces on international politics and social affairs through arts and sport to viral gags and animation. The daily online news magazine was launched under his editorship in 2005. In 2007 the site was singled out for special commendation in the Best Editorial Team category of the 2007 Awards given by the Association of Online Publishers.

The venture was bought by Felix Dennis in 2008 but Mark Law continued editing until the autumn of 2009. In October 2011 the site was incorporated into Dennis Publishing's The Week.

=== The Pyjama Game ===
He is the author of The Pyjama Game, A Journey into Judo, published in June 2007 by The Quarto Group, for which he was named as Best New Writer in the 2008 British Sports Book Awards. The book was published in the U.S. under the title Falling Hard: A Journey into The World of Judo. Tn The Sunday Times, Robert Twigger, author of Angry White Pyjamas, referred to The Pyjama Game as "an excellent history of judo combining theory, story-telling and first-hand practice". Taki, of The Spectator, also called it "the greatest judo book ever."

== Personal life ==
Law lives in London.

== See also ==
- Judo in the United Kingdom
