= Judo in the United Kingdom =

- Country: United Kingdom
- Governing body: British Judo Association
- National team: Great Britain Olympics team

International competitions
- IJF World Tour; Summer Olympics; Judo at the Commonwealth Games

Judo in the United Kingdom has a long history; the martial art being first introduced in 1899, and the first dojo, the Budokwai, being the oldest in Europe. The British Judo Association is the United Kingdom's official governing body for judo – in which British citizens have won eighteen Olympic medals.

== History ==
The Japanese martial art judo was introduced to the United Kingdom in 1899, when entrepreneur Edward William Barton-Wright sponsored a visit from a team of Japanese judoka with the intention of establishing a jujutsu school in England. The introduction was not immediately successful, but some members of the team, including Yukio Tani, remained in England and gradually cultivated public interest in judo and other types of jujutsu through demonstrations, instruction and prize fighting. The United Kingdom's first Judo dojo, the Budokwai, is the oldest in Europe and was founded by Gunji Koizumi in 1918 with Yukio Tani as its chief instructor.

== Current organisation ==
British Judo Association (BJA) is the United Kingdom's official governing body for judo and was established in 1948 under the chairmanship of Trevor Leggett. Additionally, the Amateur Judo Association, The All England Judo Federation and the British Judo Council are smaller nationwide judo associations. There also numerous regional bodies, including Judo For All Uk, Merseyside Judo Association and Universal Budo Association.

== Olympic success ==
British citizens have won nineteen Olympic medals in judo since it was added to the Summer Games in 1964. Neil Adams is the United Kingdom's most successful judoka, winning silver in the −71 kg category in 1980, and in the −78 kg category in 1984.

Two members of the United Kingdom's 2012 Olympic team received medals in judo: Gemma Gibbons won silver in the −78 kg women's category, and Karina Bryant won bronze in the +78 kg category. Gibbons' popularity surged after the win, with the number of followers on her Twitter account jumping from 600 to more than 22,600 in 24 hours, and the number of 'likes' on her Facebook page growing by 3000 per cent. A week later, the British Judo Association announced that its website had received thousands of search requests for local clubs since Gibbons' and Bryant's wins.

Simon Jackson MBE is a visually impaired judoka and cyclist from Britain. He has competed in five Paralympic Games winning gold medals in three consecutive Games. Jackson is the only British person to win a Paralympic judo gold medal and the most successful judo competitor from the country. In addition to his Paralympic success he also won three world titles and 16 European gold medals. At the 2012 Paralympics, Ben Quilter won bronze in the −60 kg category, and Sam Ingram won silver in the −90 kg category.

Chelsie Giles won bronze in the Women's 52 kg at the 2020 Summer Olympics in Tokyo in 2020.

== Writing ==
Journalist Mark Law was named 'Best New Writer' in the 2008 British Sports Book Awards for his book The Pyjama Game: A Journey into Judo, which was later published as Falling Hard: A Journey into the World of Judo in the United States. The book is a history of judo in Japan, Britain and other parts of the world, framed by Law's own experience of beginning judo after his fiftieth birthday and working his way up to sho dan (first-degree black belt) at the Budokwai.

== See also ==
- Judo by country
- Suffrajitsu – self-defence practised by suffragettes, based on jujutsu
