= British Judo Association =

Judo association

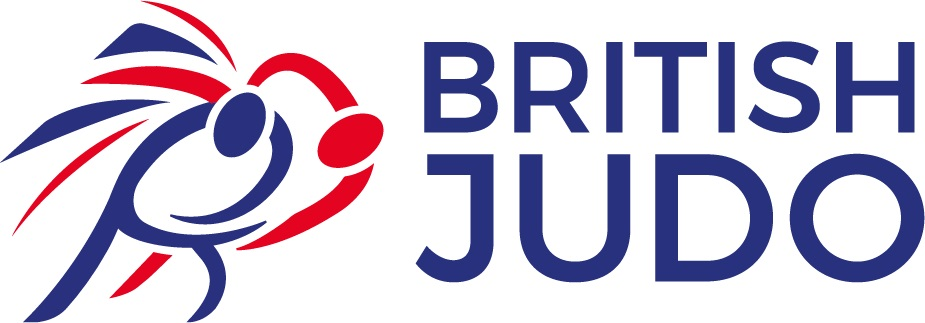
- Sport: Judo
- Abbreviation: BJA
- Founded: 1948
- Affiliation: IJF
- Regional affiliation: EJU
- Headquarters: Walsall, West Midlands
- Chairman: Gerry Gualtieri
- CEO: Andrew Scoular
- Men's coach: Colin Oates
- Women's coach: Jamie Johnson

Official website
- britishjudo.org.uk
- (United Kingdom)

The British Judo Association (BJA) is the governing body for the Olympic sport of judo in the United Kingdom. In 2019 there were 35,000 members.

The BJA represents the United Kingdom internationally and is a member of the International Judo Federation, the European Judo Union, the Judo Confederation of the European Union, the British Olympic Association, the Central Council of Physical Recreation, and the Commonwealth Judo Association. It is recognised by the United Kingdom Sports Council, Sport England, Sport Wales, the Sports Council for Northern Ireland, Sportscotland and the British Olympic Association.

== History ==
On 24 July 1948 the BJA held its first Management Committee Meeting at the Imperial College Union, at which time the BJA was established as the national body representing judo in the United Kingdom.

In 1961 the BJA had more than 300 female members.

== Affiliates ==
The BJA has three home nation subsidiaries: JudoScotland, the Welsh Judo Association and the Northern Ireland Judo Federation.

In addition to these, two independent membership organisations, the British Judo Council (BJC) and the Amateur Judo Association (AJA) affiliated to the BJA in the late 1990s.

== See also ==
- Judo in the United Kingdom
- List of judo organizations
- Judo by country
- Gunji Koizumi
