= Dennis Publishing =

British magazine publisher

Dennis Publishing Ltd.
- Industry: Magazine and internet publishing
- Founded: 1973; 53 years ago
- Founder: Felix Dennis
- Defunct: 2021
- Fate: Broken-up, company and most titles acquired by Future plc; selected assets retained by Exponent under Autovia Limited and Broadleaf Group
- Successor: Autovia Limited (automotive titles); Broadleaf Group (four titles); Future plc (company and most titles)
- Headquarters: London, England, UK

Dennis Publishing Ltd. was a British publisher. It was founded in 1973 as Sportscene Specialist Press by Felix Dennis. Its first publication was a kung-fu magazine. Most of its titles now belong to Future plc.

In the 1980s, it became a leading publisher of computer enthusiast magazines in the United Kingdom. In the 1990s, it expanded to the American market, where it published the lifestyle magazines Maxim, the consumer electronics magazine Stuff, and the music magazine Blender. In 2007, the company sold all its American holdings, with the exception of the U.S. edition of The Week.

Felix Dennis died in 2014, leaving ownership of the company to the charity organization Heart of England Forest. In 2018, the company was sold to Exponent, a British private equity firm.

Future plc acquired the company and its 12 titles in August 2021, absorbing them into Future Publishing.

== History ==
=== Foundation and early development ===
Felix Dennis started in the magazine business in the late 1960s as one of the editors of the counterculture magazine OZ. In 1973, he founded Sportscene Specialist Press, beginning with a kung-fu magazine, Kung Fu Monthly.

Dennis followed this up in the early 1980s by publishing titles in the emerging computer enthusiast sector, including Your Spectrum (later renamed Your Sinclair and sold to Future Publishing). Dennis has since maintained a foothold in the computer magazine business; until Maxim's success in the United States in the late 1990s, computer magazines were the mainstay of Dennis' magazine holdings, second only to Future Publishing in the UK.

In 1987 the company was renamed Dennis Publishing.

Dennis Publishing, Inc. published one of the most successful modern men's lifestyle magazines in America: Maxim (2.5 million rate base) – along with Stuff (1.3 million rate base) and general interest music magazine Blender (800,000 rate base).

=== 2000–2021 ===
On 5 February 2005, Maxim Radio was launched on Sirius Satellite Radio. On 12 November 2008, Sirius and XM merged, and five days later Sirius XM Stars Too debuted on Sirius Satellite Radio on Sirius 108 and XM 139. In May 2011, Stars Too moved to channel 104 on both services.

On 15 February 2007, Dennis Publishing, Inc. announced that it had retained media investment firm Allen & Company as its exclusive financial advisor to explore various strategic alternatives available to the company including a possible sale of the company. In June 2007, all of Dennis's United States holdings – minus the U.S. edition of The Week – were sold to the private equity firm Quadrangle Group. This included the editions of Maxim, Stuff and Blender.

In January 2008, Dennis Publishing acquired the online news site The First Post for an undisclosed sum. In February, Dennis Publishing announced the launch of iGizmo, a free fortnightly interactive digital magazine dedicated to gadgets and consumer technology, launching on 11 March. In November, Dennis Publishing acquired the online games and hardware enthusiast website Bit-Tech for an undisclosed sum.

For 2012, Dennis Publishing, producing more than 50 magazines, increased its group pre-tax profits by 35% year-on-year from £4.1m to £5.5m. Group operating profit climbed almost 12% to £4.9m. Group turnover, excluding share of joint venture revenues, rose slightly year on year to just over £70m. Revenues including joint ventures climbed 3% to £77.7m. Operations in the UK accounted for almost 84% of total revenues.

After Felix Dennis' death in 2014, Dennis Publishing was owned by the Heart of England Forest Charity, a charity set up by Dennis to replant trees.

In 2015, Dennis Publishing invested £3million in the launch of Coach, a free health and fitness magazine for men with a circulation of 300,000. The launch editor was Ed Needham.

In 2017, based on DoG Tech's rapid growth in the United States and other markets, Dennis Publishing entered into a joint venture agreement with DoG Tech LLC.

In July 2017, Dennis Publishing acquired MoneyWeek, UK's best-selling financial magazine.

In July 2018, Dennis Publishing was bought by Exponent, a British private equity firm. The proceeds from the sale went to the Heart of England Forest charity and the speculated figure for the acquisition was £150 million.

In October 2018, Dennis Publishing launched Driving Electric, a website focused on hybrid and electric car reviews, news, features and videos aimed at UK consumers.

In February 2019, Dennis Publishing acquired Kiplinger, an American publisher of personal finance and business publications such as the personal finance magazine Kiplinger's Personal Finance and the weekly business and economic forecasting newsletter The Kiplinger Letter. The company also owns the website Kiplinger.com. The terms of the deal were not disclosed. Later that year, Dennis Publishing divested its share in Den of Geek World Limited to its partner, DoG Tech LLC.

In February 2020, Dennis Publishing announced plans to launch a United States version of The Week Junior, a weekly subscription print magazine aimed at children aged 8 to 14 which was initially published in the UK in 2015.

In March 2021, Exponent separated Dennis Publishing's automotive assets into an independent division within Dennis called Autovia Limited.

=== 2021 sale to Future plc ===
In August 2021, Future plc acquired Dennis Publishing Ltd and its 12 titles (including The Week) while Exponent moved Cyclist, Expert Reviews, Fortean Times, and Viz into a separate holding company called Broadleaf Group. Dennis Publishing's automotive assets were transferred to now-independent Autovia Limited.

== Dennis Digital ==
Dennis Digital, formerly known as MaximNet, which launched in 1999, is the interactive Internet and mobile division of Dennis Publishing, which publishes Maxim, Stuff, and The Week, and previously published (now defunct) Blender.

== Publications ==
Dennis Publishing titles up until Autovia Limited spin-out and Future plc acquisition including:

- Auto Express
- Carbuyer
- Carthrottle
- Channel Pro
- CloudPro
- Coach
- Computeract!ve
- Cyclist
- Driving Electric
- evo
- Fortean Times
- IT Pro
- Kiplinger's Personal Finance
- Minecraft World
- MoneyWeek
- PC Pro
- Predasaurs Magazine
- The Week
- Viz
