= Savate (film) =

1995 American martial arts film

- Savate movie cover
- Directed by: Isaac Florentine
- Written by: Isaac Florentine; Julian Stone
- Starring: Olivier Gruner; James Brolin; R. Lee Ermey (uncredited); Ashley Laurence; Marc Singer; Ian Ziering
- Music by: Kevin Kiner
- Release date: August 24, 1995
- Running time: 88 minutes
- Country: United States
- Language: English

Savate (also known as The Fighter) is a 1995 martial arts Western film directed by Isaac Florentine and starring Olivier Gruner, promoted as the allegedly true story of the world's first kickboxer.

== Plot ==
The year is 1865. Joseph Charlegrand (Olivier Gruner) is a former French soldier whose best friend and comrade was murdered by an officer Ziegfield Von Trotta (Marc Singer) of the French Foreign Legion in Mexico. Looking for the murderer, Charlegrand is heading for a martial arts tournament in the United States because the murderer takes his pride in being a skilled fighter.

On his way from Mexico to Texas some American rogues take him for a Yankee and ambush him. He can fight them off but loses his horse. On foot he runs out of water and eventually breaks down. Two young farmers Mary and Cain Parker (Ashley Laurence and Ian Ziering) save his life.

When the farmers go to town for purchases they are molested and eventually seriously attacked by the roustabouts of a local business man Benedict (R. Lee Ermey) who wants their land very badly. The film's protagonist returns the farmer's favour by applying his savate. Yet, it is obvious they need further support.

Consequently, he stays with them and even instructs Cain how to fight, so that he might win the martial arts tournament and hereby earn the money they need to pay the new taxes. But during one night masked riders burn their barn and one of them loses a precision dice Mitchum (Michael Palance). Cain recognises this object, follows the culprit into town and confronts him. After Cain has been shot dead, all farmers are ready to sell out.

The hero decides he must not let that happen, hence he takes the dead farmer's place in the tournament and tells the farmers to bet all their money on him. In order to prevent him from being successful, his friend's murderer, the German-speaking von Trotta (Marc Singer) is hired.

But the bad guys leave nothing to chance and also take Mary Parker as hostage. Charlegrand manages to cause enough confusion to disappear between two fights, so that he can free Mary and force Colonel Jones (James Brolin) to spill the beans. The alleged new taxes turn out to be a hoax but the farmer's savings are on Charlegrand and so they still need him to win the tournament. Therefore, his final battle with von Trotta mustn't be postponed, even though Charlegrand has been shot in the course of action.

== Cast ==
- Olivier Gruner as Joseph Charlegrand
- Ian Ziering as Cain Parker
- Ashley Laurence as Mary Parker
- Marc Singer as Ziegfield Von Trotta
- James Brolin as Colonel Jones
- Michael Palance as Mitchum
- Rance Howard as Farmer
- Peter Lee as The Master
- R. Lee Ermey as Benedict

== Background ==
The French Foreign Legion had been founded in 1831, one year after the Garde Écossaise had been officially dissolved. Right from the beginning many German-speaking men joined the forces, often hiding behind false names. In 1861 Napoleon III used the Legion for the French intervention in Mexico. It lasted until 1867. At that time Charles Lecour had already created and established French boxing as a blend of savate and English boxing. Hitherto savateurs had used their hands mainly to block kicks or to fence with sticks (canne de combat) at the same time. One of Lecour's students was former army instructor Joseph Charlemont. Against this background it is imaginable a savateur like Joseph Charlegrand could have served in Mexico and that he might have met a German-speaking legionnaire during this time, though the slow speed of communications and travel in 1865 as well as the lack of cross-over in combat sports of the time make the idea of an international martial arts contest in the wilds of the American West highly unlikely.

== Reception ==
J.R. Taylor of Entertainment Weekly gave it a grade C+. TheActionElite.com rated the film 3.5 out of 5 praising action directed by Isaac Florentine.
