= Savate =

French combat sport

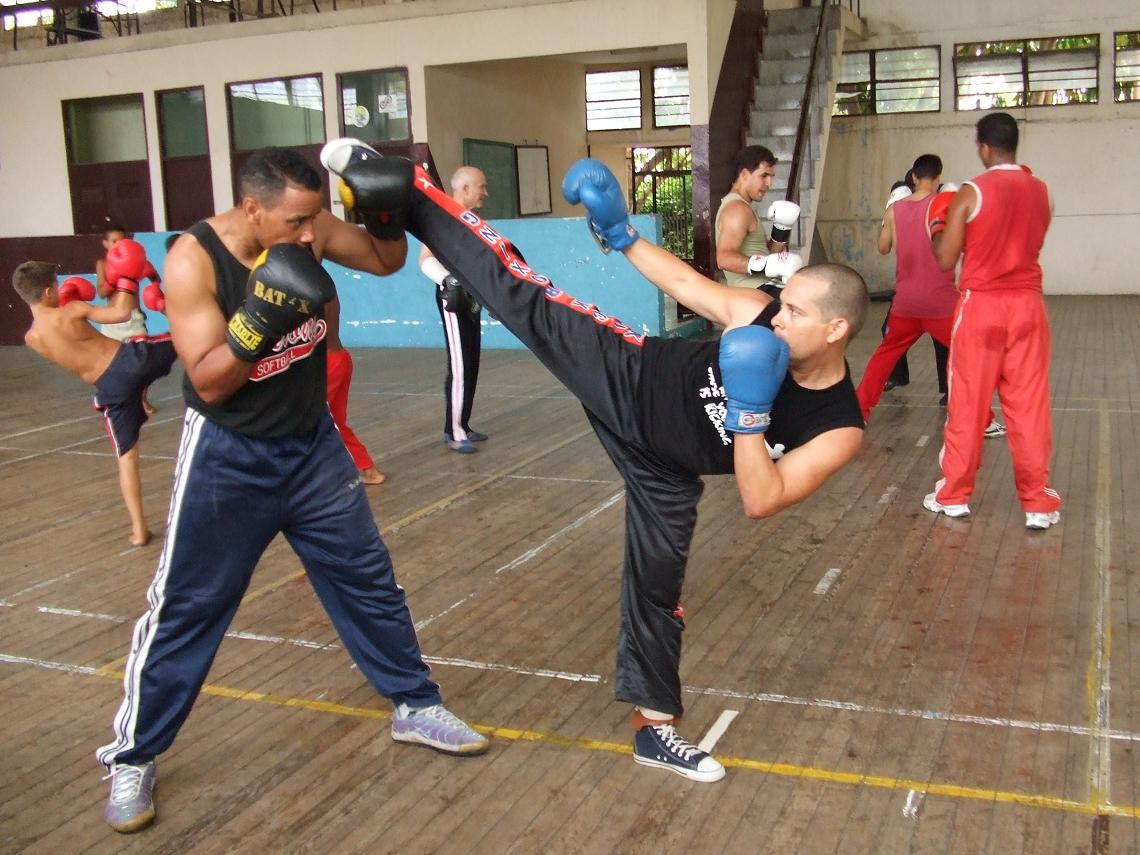
- Also known as: French boxing, French footfighting
- Focus: Kick Federation Internationale de Savate
- Hardness: Full contact
- Country of origin: France
- Creator: Michel Casseux, Charles Lecour
- Famous practitioners: (see notable practitioners)
- Parenthood: Boxing, Ancient footfighting
- Descendant arts: Kickboxing, Jeet Kune Do, Mixed Martial Arts
- Olympic sport: only the 1924 Summer Olympics

Savate (French pronunciation: [savat]), also known as French boxing (French: Boxe Française) or French foot fighting, is a French hybrid martial art and full-contact combat sport that combines principles of western boxing with a wide variety of kicking techniques. Unlike some kickboxing styles which allow knee and/or shin strikes in competitive bouts, savate involves kicking exclusively with one's feet, but participants can nonetheless target any part of the body. The sport is also notable for requiring footwear to be worn by the competitors, as would be expected from individuals fighting in the streets. A male practitioner of savate is called a "tireur" while a female one is a "tireuse".

Savate de rue (lit. 'street savate'), the term used to differentiate the original martial art meant for self-defense from the subsequent combat sport, is an overarching hand-to-hand combat discipline that incorporates knee and elbow strikes as well as joint locks, sweeps, throws, headbutts and takedowns, in addition to punches and kicks.

== Etymology ==
Savate takes its name from the French for "old shoe" or "old boot", referencing heavy footwear (more specifically the boots worn by French sailors at the time the discipline emerged).

== History ==
The modern formalized form is mainly an amalgam of French street fighting techniques from the beginning of the 19th century. Savate was then a type of street fighting common in Paris and northern France.

According to one theory, in the time of Napoleon Bonaparte, his soldiers publicly displayed their "aptitudes" by kicking their prisoners' behinds. The punishment was known as savate, which can be translated as “old shoe”.

=== Origin ===
Savate originated in France in the 17th century and was practiced by some sailors in the southern port of Marseille. According to historians, it was developed and learned by sailors on board the ships during their trips to the countries of the Indian Ocean and China Seas. Subsequently, in every bar fight in French ports, it was common to see savate kicks. Sailors called this type of combat "Chausson", in reference to the slippers normally worn on board.

Contact with African and Brazilian fighting styles also occurred through interaction between French sailors and martial arts practitioners in the country's colonial holdings. French naval ships between 1820 and 1833 travelled from France to ports in Brazil (Capoeira), Martinique (Danmyé) and Madagascar (Moraingy).

=== Early history ===
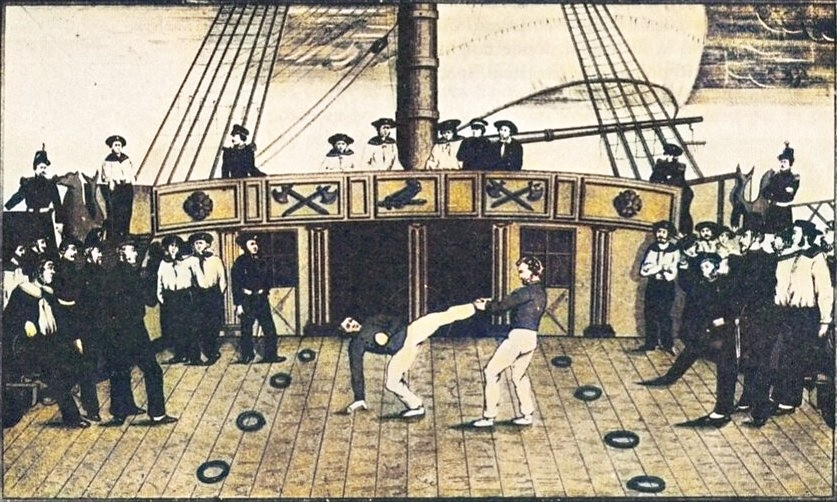
Illustration from 1847 of French sailors practicing savate on a ship.

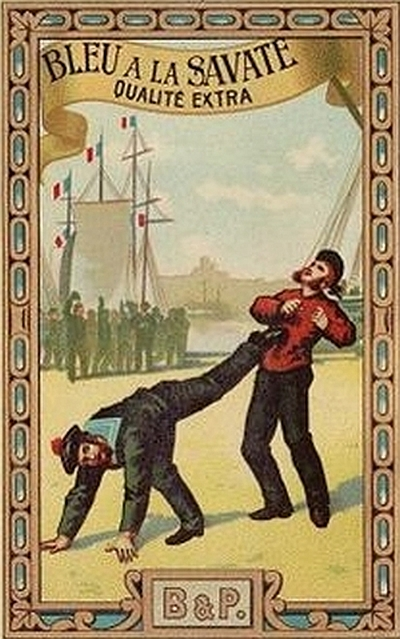
Savate illustration from the 19th century, showing a kick similar to a rabo de arraia in capoeira.

In the south, especially in the port of Marseille, sailors developed a fighting style involving high kicks and open-handed slaps. It is conjectured that this kicking style was developed in this way to allow the fighter to use a hand to hold onto something for balance on a rocking ship's deck, and that the kicks and slaps were used on land to avoid the legal penalties for using a closed fist, which was considered a deadly weapon under the law. It was known as the jeu marseillais (game from Marseille), and was later renamed chausson (slipper, after the type of shoes the sailors wore). In contrast, at this time in England (the home of boxing and the Queensberry rules), kicking was seen as unsportsmanlike.

Traditional savate was a northern French development, especially in Paris' slums, and always used heavy shoes and boots derived from its potential military origins. Street fighting savate, unlike chausson, kept the kicks low, almost never targeted above the groin, and they were delivered with vicious, bone-breaking intent. Parisian savate also featured open hand blows, in thrusting or smashing palm strikes (la baffe) or in stunning slaps targeted to facial nerves. Techniques of savate or chausson were at this time also developed in the ports of northwest Italy and northeastern Spain—hence one savate kick named the "Italian kick" (chassé italien).

=== Reform ===
The two key historical figures in the history of the shift from street fighting to the modern sport of savate are Michel Casseux (also known as le Pisseux) (1794–1869) and Charles Lecour (1808–1894). Casseux opened the first establishment in 1825 for practicing and promoting a regulated version of chausson and savate (disallowing head butting, eye gouging, grappling, etc.).

However, the sport had not shaken its reputation as a street-fighting technique. Lecour created a modern edition of the martial art by 1830. He incorporated boxing techniques with kicking techniques and showed how to use them together. He was the first to see savate as both a sport and self-defense system. Lecour was the first to add English boxing gloves to the martial art, which allowed his students to train their punches without injuring their hands.

Lecour was exposed to the English art of boxing when he witnessed an English boxing match in France between English pugilist Owen Swift and Jack Adams in 1838. Lecour also took part in a friendly sparring match with Swift later in that same year. Lecour felt that he was at a disadvantage, using his hands only to bat his opponent's fists away, rather than to punch. He trained in boxing for a time before combining boxing with chausson and savate to create the sport of savate (or boxe française, as we know it today). At some point la canne and le baton, stick fighting, were added, and some form of stick fencing, such as la canne, is commonly part of savate training. Those who train purely for competition may omit this. Savate was developed professionally by Lecour's student Joseph Charlemont and then his son Charles Charlemont. Charles continued his father's work, and in 1899 fought an English boxer named Jerry Driscoll. He won the match with a round-kick (fouetté median) in the eighth round although the English said that it was a kick to the groin. According to the well known English referee, Bernard John Angle of the National Sporting Club, in his book My Sporting Memories (London, 1925), "Driscoll did not know what he was taking on" when he agreed "to meet the Frenchman at his own game". Angle also said that, "The contest ended in Jerry being counted out to a blow in the groin from the Frenchman's knee." He further alleged that "the timekeeper saved Charlemont several times". After the fight Driscoll bore no grudges, considering the blow to have been "an accident". The French claimed victory for their man by stoppage, following a round-kick to Driscoll's stomach.

=== Codification ===
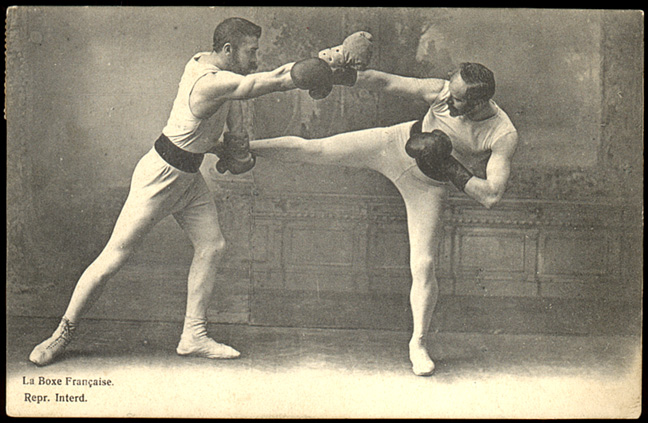
French boxing "tireurs" in 1900

Savate was later codified under a Committee National de Boxe Française under Charles Charlemont's student Count Pierre Baruzy (dit Barozzi). The Count is seen as the father of modern savate and was 11-time Champion of France and its colonies, his first ring combat and title prior to the First World War. Savate de Défense, Défense Savate or Savate de Rue ("street savate") is the name given to those methods of fighting excluded from savate competition. The International Savate Federation (FIS) is the official worldwide ruling body of savate.

Perhaps the ultimate recognition of the respectability of savate came in 1924 when it was included as a demonstration sport in the Olympic Games in Paris. In 2008, savate was recognised by the International University Sports Federation (FISU). This recognition allows savate to hold official University World Championships; the first was held in Nantes, France in 2010. The 25th anniversary of the founding of the International Savate Federation, in March 2010, was celebrated with a visit to Lausanne, to meet with International Olympic Committee President Jacques Rogge. FISav President Gilles Le Duigou was presented with a memento depicting the Olympic Rings. In April 2010, the International Savate Federation was accepted as a member of SportAccord (previously known as AGFIS) – a big step forward on the road to Olympic recognition.

== Modern practice ==
In modern practice, safety practices are integrated into the practice of savate. Savate is practiced in many parts of the world by amateurs, including in Australia, the US, Finland and Britain. Many countries have national federations devoted to promoting savate.

Modern codified savate provides for three levels of competition:

- Assaut requires the competitors to focus on their technique while still making contact; referees assign penalties for the use of excessive force.
- Pre-combat allows for full-strength fighting so long as the fighters wear protective gear such as helmets and shinguards.
- Combat, the most intense level, is the same as pre-combat, but protective gear other than groin protection and mouthguards is prohibited.

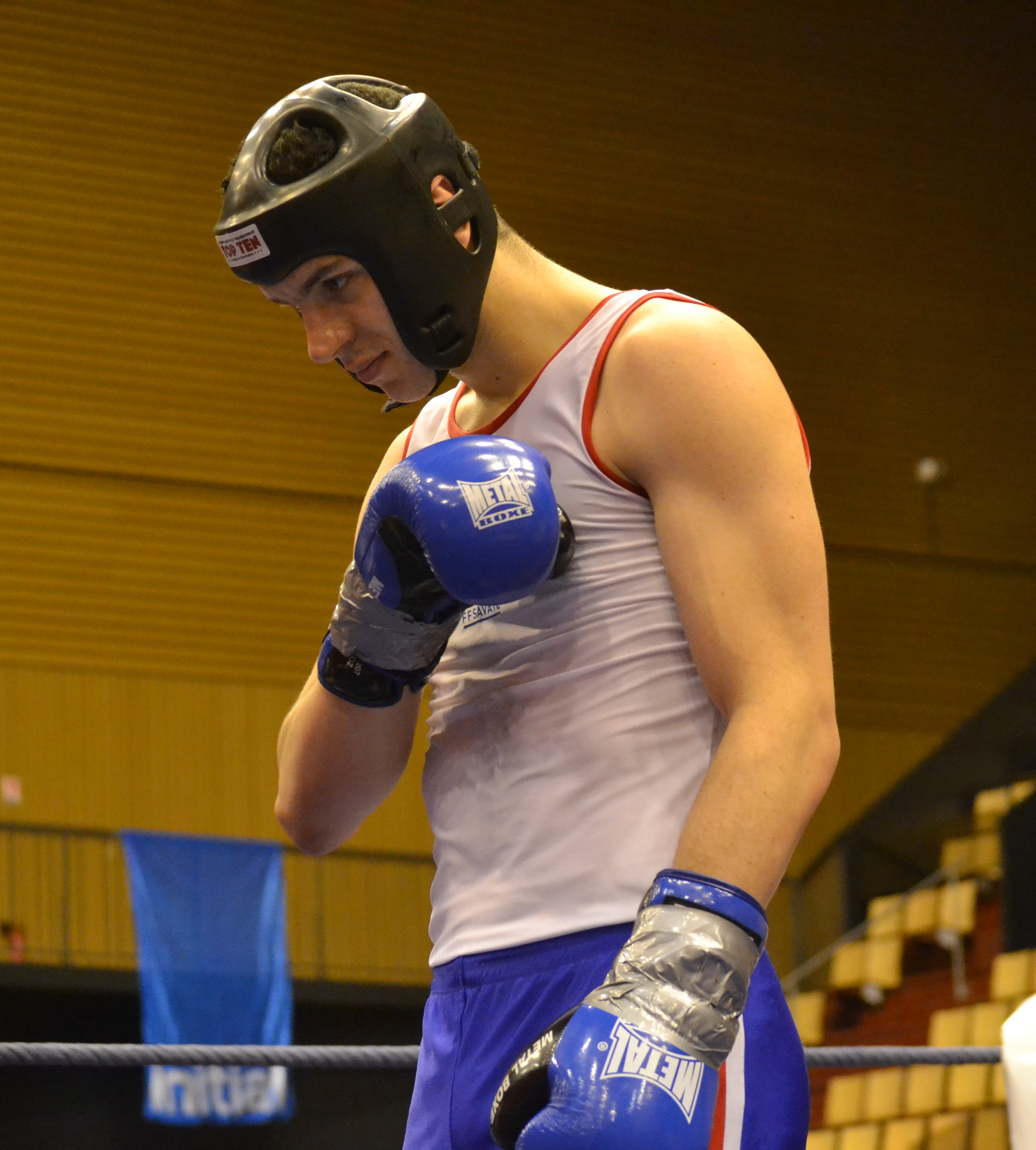
The savate salute

Many martial arts provide ranking systems, such as belt colours. Savate uses glove colours to indicate a fighter's level of proficiency (unlike arts such as many modern styles of karate, which assign new belts at each promotion, moving to a higher colour rank in savate does not necessarily entail a change in the colour of one's actual gloves, and a given fighter may continue using the same pair of gloves through multiple promotions). Novices begin at no colour.

The qualifications for competition vary depending on the association or commission. In the French Federation a yellow glove can compete, and in Belgium a green glove can compete. In the United States, the competition levels start at novice (6 months). In Russia there is no requirement for a specific glove colour in order to compete.

The ranking of savate is divided into three paths:

- Technical road: blue glove, green glove, red glove, white glove, yellow glove, silver glove I, silver glove II and silver glove III (violet glove for those less than 17 years of age). Prior to 1985 silver glove I, II, III did not exist. There was only one technical silver glove Rank (Original GAT) (Combining BF Savate and Canne de combat). After 1985 the silver glove technique (GAT BFS/Canne) was broken into 3 subcategories I, II and III and no longer included Canne de Combat. The "yellow pommel" is the "New GAT (post 1985)" of Canne de Combat.

GAT vs GAT# patches: pre- and post-1985 patches distinction:

- The few remaining pre-1985 Silver Glove Rank (combining GAT1, GAT2, GAT3 and Canne de combat) wear a unique "GAT" rectangular patch rank (without number) on their uniform and are probably over 59 years old. The GAT was required for professorship.
- Post 1985 Silver glove Rank wear a rectangular patch rank with either "GAT1", "GAT2" and "GAT3".

Similarly, the former FFBFSDA Professorship of BF-SAVATE requirements included Canne de Combat. New savate "instructorships" tests do not have these requirements. Both sports have split although still under a same federation. These sports can be used in combinations together.

- Competition road: bronze glove, silver glove I (GAC1), silver glove II (GAC2), silver glove III (GAC3), silver glove IV and silver glove V.
- Teaching ranks: initiateur (instructor level 1), moniteur (instructor level 2/master) and professeur (rarely given). These ranks require additional knowledge than just savate. Examinations includes anatomy, regulations of savate, education training, first aid certification, savate techniques and other.
- Referee ranking: Juge arbitre stagiaire, Juge arbitre

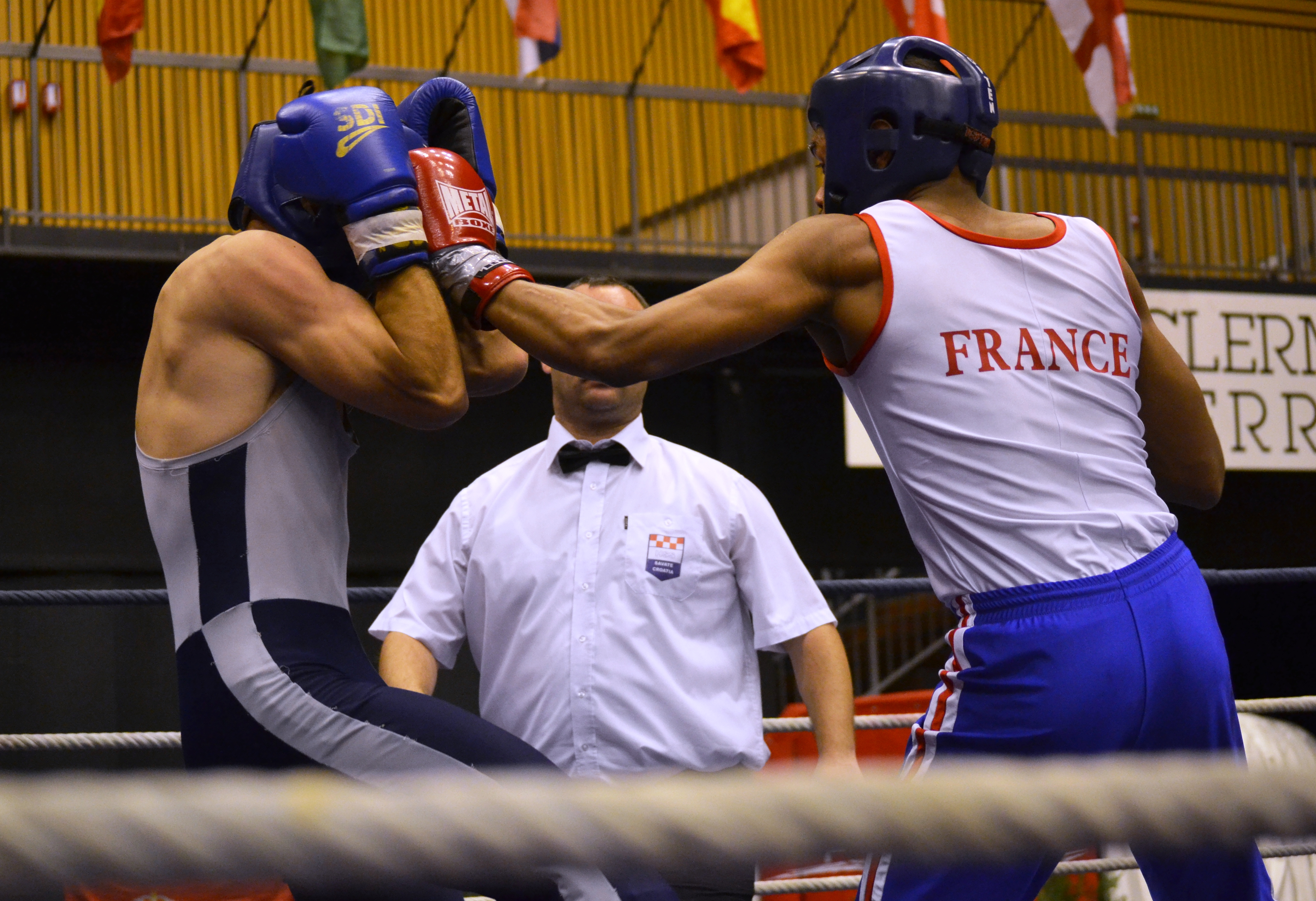
Match at the 2013 World Championship qualifiers

In some clubs there is also a rank of aide-moniteur, while in other associations there is no rank of initiateur. Eight to twelve years of training on average are necessary for a student to reach professeur level; eight years average depending on skills. In France the professional professeur must have a French state certificate of specialized teaching (CQP AS, BEES 1st, 2nd and 3rd degree, 1st de CCB BPJEPS, DEJEPS, DESJEPS). These diplomas are university level education in sports with specialisation in savate (supervised by the French Federation of BF Savate and associated disciplines (Canne, Self Defense, Lutte, baton) (i.e.:FFBFSDA). The international federation (FIS), however, is still allowed to award professeur to non-French nationals without requiring such rigid system of education. French nationals have to submit and succeed to the rigid system of education and prove themselves in competition as well as being respected by peers, in order to have a slight chance to become a DTD (directeur technique départemental). Like any sport federations in France, the French and International Federation of Savate are under the control of France Ministry of Sport and Youth. This makes these two federations extremely powerful federations on the world scene. These two federations have followed a set of national traditions.

Nowadays, savate is just a term meaning Savate-Boxe Française. In the 1970s the term savate was rarely used in France to refer to the formalised sport: people mostly used the term Savate boxe française, Boxe-Française Savate, BF, BFS, SBF or simply boxe française. The term savate remains in use mostly outside France or when speaking a language other than French.

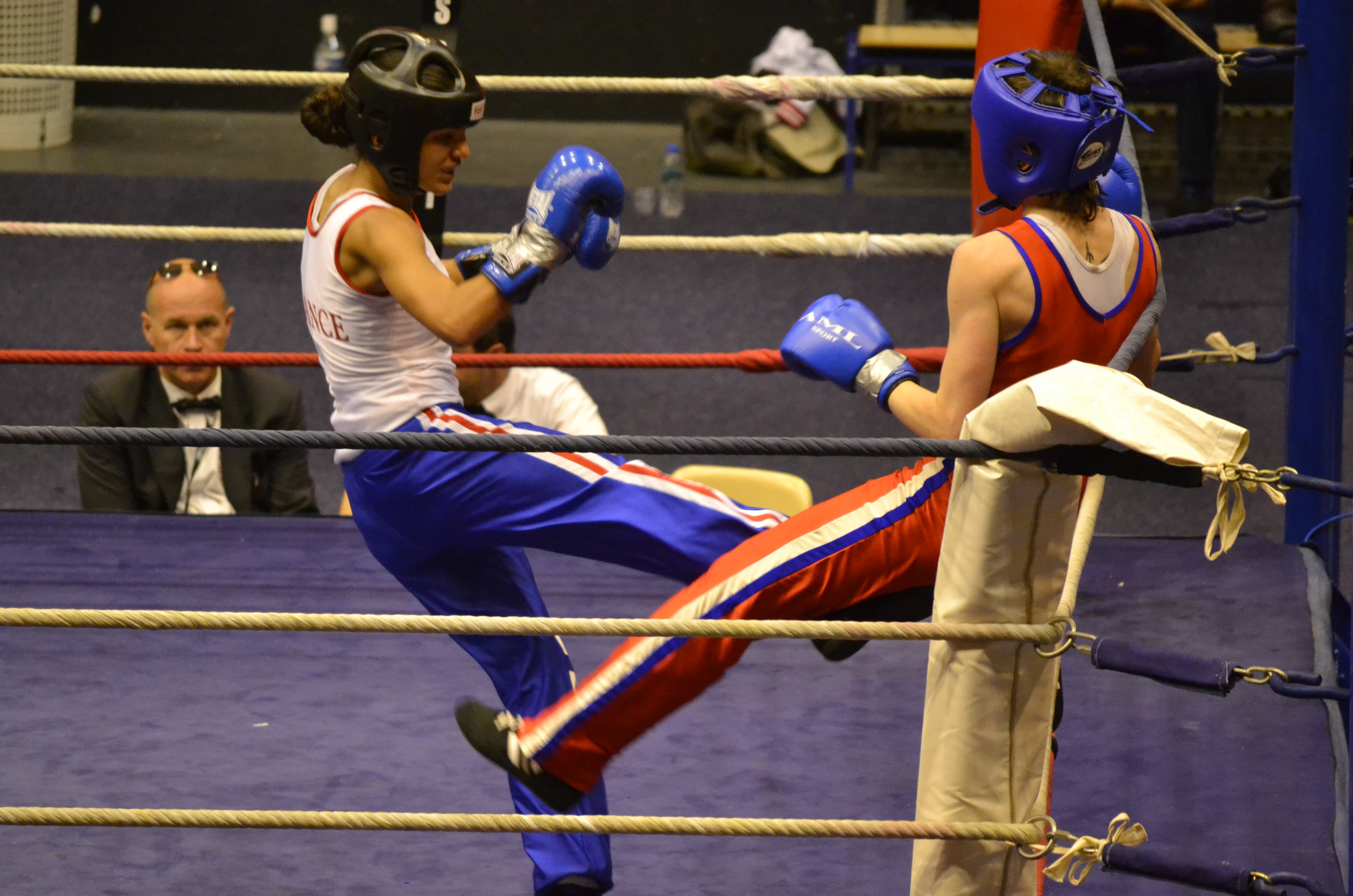
Match between two tireuses (female savate boxers)

The global distribution of schools (salles) today is best explained through their stylistic approaches:

- La Savate-Boxe Française (1980–present): the technical abilities of both savate's major kicking arsenal and English boxing were merged into a definitive sport of combat.
- La Savate Défense (1994–present): was first presented by Professeur Pierre Chainge, then produced into Self-Defense by Eric Quequet in 2000. After the French Federation dismantled Prof. Chainge and placed Michel Leroux in charge of the formations. It is based on La Boxe Française Savate, La Savate of the late 19th century, La Lutte Parisienne and the discipline* of La canne de Combat (stick) *includes also Le Bâton Français (staff), Le Couteau (knife), Le Poignard (dagger), La Chaise (chair) and Le Manteau (overcoat).
- Re-constructed historical savate: some savate has been re-constructed from old textbooks, such as those written in the late 19th or early 20th century. As such, this form of savate would be considered a historical European martial art. Re-construction of these older systems may or may not be performed by practitioners familiar with the modern sport and is not at present likely to be particularly widespread.
- La savate forme (2008): Cardio-kickboxing form of La Boxe Française-Savate.

These are the different stylistic approaches of the French arts of pugilism in the world today.

== In the United States ==
In the United States Jean-Noel Eynard brought Savate Boxe-Francaise & Canne de Combat (FFBFSDA) as a pioneer to the east coast. it is said that Daniel Duby brought Savate (FNBF) to the west coast in Southern California. The first real FFBFSDA/ FIS club of Boxe-Francaise Savate was open in 1983 on the east coast in Philadelphia at St Joseph's University, under Jean-Noel Eynard, FFBFSDA/ FIS Professeur with the assistance of former FFBFSDA/ FIS DTN Bob Alix. Forward thinking, Jean-Noel Eynard registered a series of written worksheets (1983-1999) titled Prof. Eynard's easy guide to savate with the U.S. Copyright Office and Library of Congress as copyrighted text, including the word Savate as a sport rather than something else. In 1988 the US Registry of savate was created on the east coast which became the American Registry of Savate Instructors and Clubs in 1994 (ARSIC-International). Meanwhile, on the west coast savate clubs were spurring from the California Association of Savate. A couple years later, under the collaborative assistance of a steering committee made of Gilles le Duigou (FIS), JN Eynard, ARSIC-International (PA), Armando Basulto (NJ) and Norman Taylor, USSF president(NJ) as well as few other individuals from California, the official name of United States Savate Federation was given to this combined association. The teaching efforts of Dr. Jean-Noel Eynard, Salem Assli and Nicolas Saignac contributed to the further development of Boxe Francaise Savate in the US. Bob Alix and L. Gillot's "pedagogie de la Boxe Francaise" introduced to the world "Contact / Without being touched" mentality (i.e.«être capable de toucher sans être touché»). This teaching methodology was used by the first instructors (Initiateurs, moniteurs) and professors of SAVATE in the US who got certified by FFBFSDA. ARSIC-International has been instrumental at promoting savate in the US.

== Dress ==
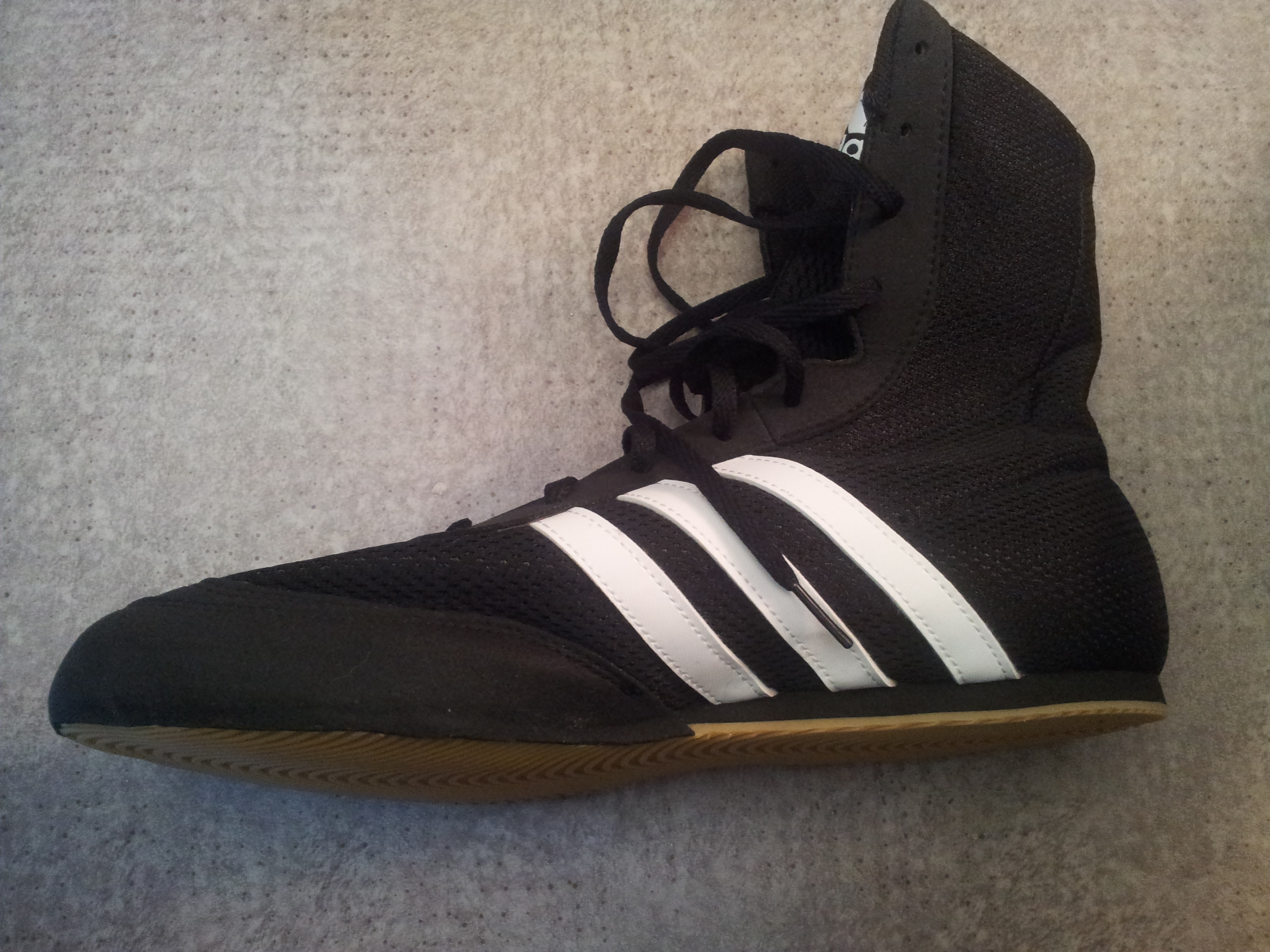
Savate shoes

In official competitions, competitors wear an intégrale or a vest and savate trousers. They wear boxing gloves (with or without padded palms) and savate boots. Savate is the only kickboxing style besides Combat Hopak to use footwear, although some other combat sports such as Shoot Fighting and some forms of MMA sometimes also wear grappling-type shoes/boots. Savate boots can be used to hit with the sole, the top of the foot, the toe, or the heel. Sometimes headgear is worn, e.g. in junior competitions and in the early rounds of combat (full contact) bouts.

== Techniques ==
In competitive or competition savate, which includes Assaut, Pre-Combat, and Combat types, there are only four kinds of kicks allowed along with four kinds of punches allowed:

=== Kicks ===
- fouetté (literally "whip", roundhouse kick making contact with the toe—hard rubber-toed shoes are worn in practice and bouts), high (figure), medium (médian) or low (bas)
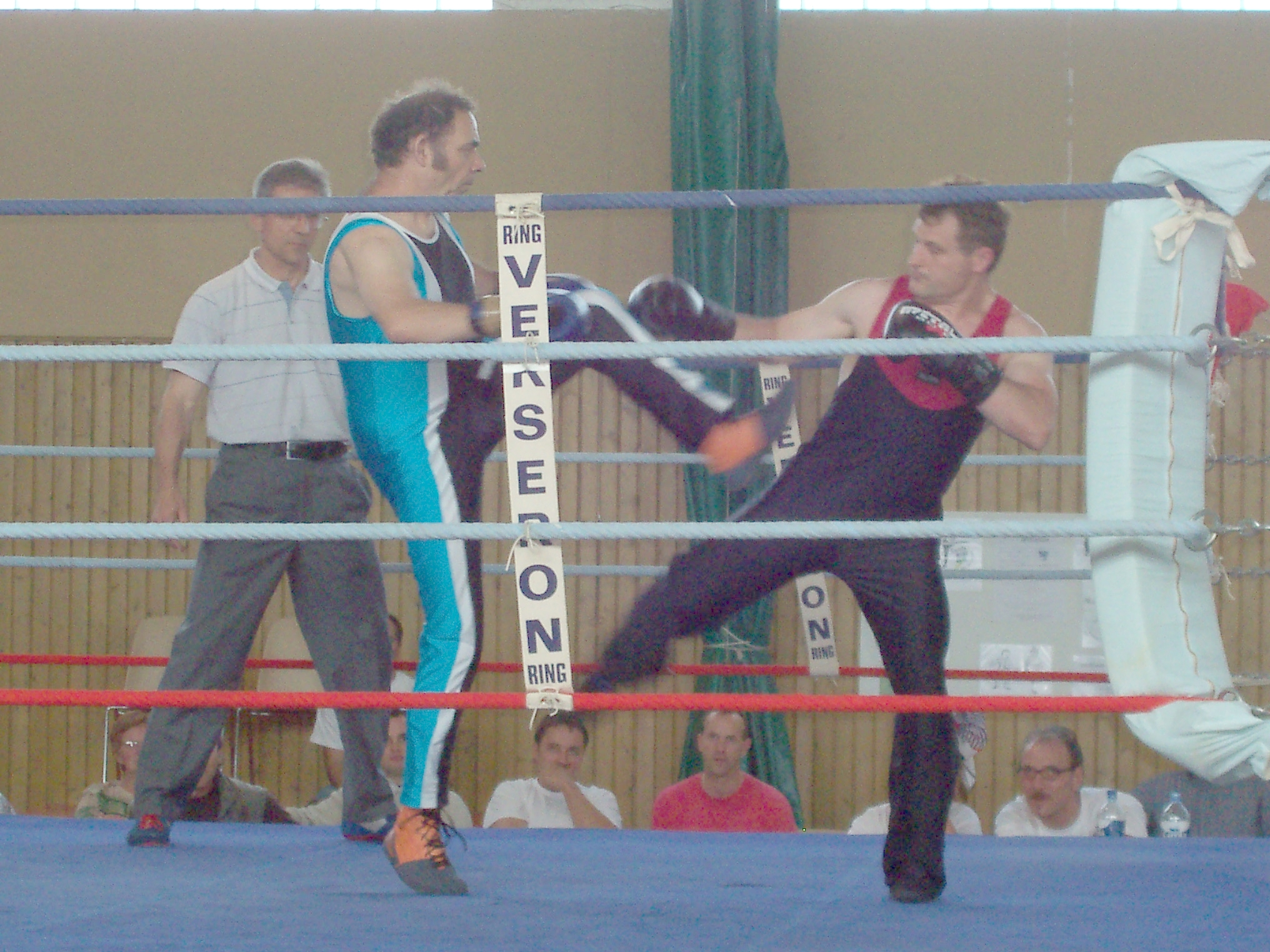
- A chassé frontal (front kick)
  chassé (side ("chassé lateral") or front ("chassé frontal") piston-action kick, high (figure), medium (médian) or low (bas)
- revers, frontal or lateral ("reverse" or hooking kick) making contact with the sole of the shoe, high (figure), medium (médian), or low (bas)
- coup de pied bas ("low kick", a front or sweep kick to the shin making contact with the inner edge of the shoe, performed with a characteristic backwards lean) low only

=== Punches ===
- direct bras avant (jab, lead hand)
- direct bras arrière (cross, rear hand)
- crochet (hook, bent arm with either hand)
- uppercut (either hand)

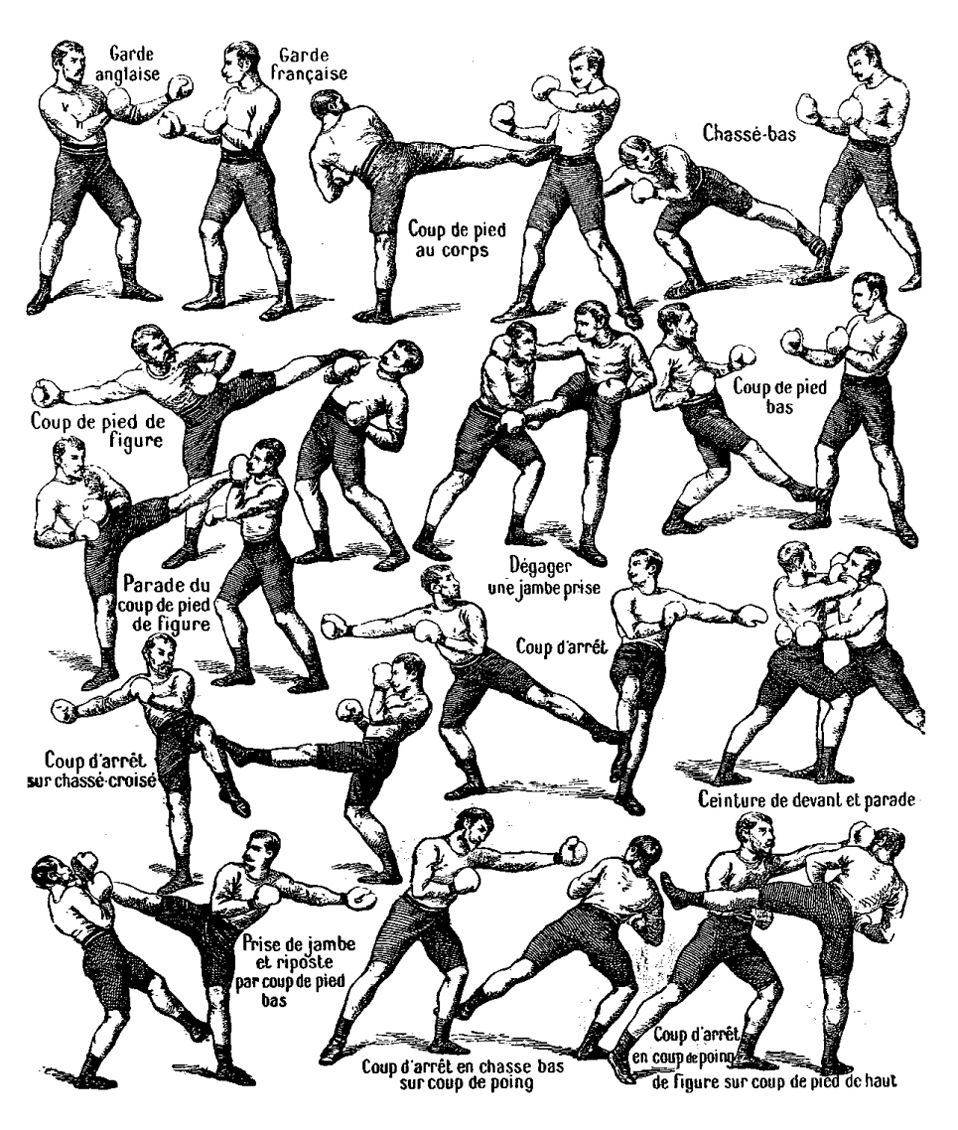
Savate techniques

== Savate de rue ==
Savate did not begin as a sport, but as a martial art for self-defence taught in the streets of Paris and Marseille. This type of savate was known as Savate de Rue (street savate). In addition to kicks and punches, savate de rue incorporates knee and elbow strikes as well as joint locks, sweeps, throws, headbutts and takedowns.

== Events ==
The International Savate Federation (Federation Internationale de Savate) holds World Championships in three disciplines: Savate Assaut, Savate Combat and Canne de combat. World Savate Combat Championships are held for seniors (over 21 years) and juniors (18 to 21 years).

=== World Combat Savate Championships (+21 years) ===
Edition	Year	Host city	Country	Events
4	2007	France	France	
5	2009	Novi Sad	Serbia	
6	2011	Milan	Italy	
7	2013	Clermont Ferrand	France	
8	2015	La Roche-sur-Yon	France	
9	2017	Varaždin	Croatia	
10	2019	Hammamet	Tunisia	
11	2021	Weiz	Austria	
12	2023	Varaždin	Croatia	

=== World Canne de Combat Savate Championships (+18 years) ===
Edition	Year	Host city	Country	Events
1	2003	Reunion Island	France	
European	2006	Strasbourg	France	
2	2008	Frankenberg/Eder	Germany	
European	2010	Cambridge	United Kingdom	
3	2012	Saint-Herblain	France	
4	2014	Budapest	Hungary	
5	2016	Varaždin	Croatia	
6	2018	Plovdiv	Bulgaria	
7	2022	Milan	Italy	

=== World Assaut Savate Championships (+18 years) ===
Edition	Year	Host city	Country	Events
1	2002	France	France	
2	2004	Plovdiv	Bulgaria	
3	2006	Villebon	France	
4	2008	Paris	France	15
5	2010	Paris	France	
6	2012	Plovdiv	Bulgaria	
7	2014	Rome	Italy	
8	2016	Varaždin	Croatia	
9	2018	Plovdiv	Bulgaria	
10	2022	Milan	Italy	

=== World Junior Savate Combat Championships (18 to 21) ===
Edition	Year	Host city	Country	Events
1	2007	France	France	
2	2009	Novi Sad	Serbia	
3	2011	Milan	Italy	
4	2013	Clermont Ferrand	France	
5	2015	La Roche Sur Yon	France	
6	2017	Varaždin	Croatia	
7	2019	Hammamet	Tunisia	
8	2021	Weiz	Austria	
9	2023	Varaždin	Croatia	

=== World Youth Savate Assaut Championships (15 to 17) ===
Edition	Year	Host city	Country	Events
1	2011	Villette-d'Anthon	France	
2	2013	Kladovo	Serbia	
3	2015	Plovdiv	Bulgaria	
4	2017	Varaždin	Croatia	
5	2019	Budapest	Hungary	
6	2021	Ruma	Serbia	
7	2023	Podcetrtek	Slovenia	

== Notable practitioners ==
- Pierre Baruzy
- Michel Casseux
- Joseph Charlemont
- Alexandre Dumas
- William E. Fairbairn
- Gerard Gordeau
- Mickey Hardt
- Jasmine Harman
- Silvia La Notte
- Charles Lecour
- Bruce Lee
- Ludovic Millet
- Vitor Miranda
- Christian M'Pumbu
- Robert Paturel
- Francois Pennacchio
- Cindy Perros
- Patrice Quarteron
- Gioachino Rossini
- Fred Royers
- Fedir Shchus
- Pierre Vigny
- Tom Watson

== Cultural references ==
The 1959 book Starship Troopers mentions the character Captain Frankel practicing savate.

In "Dr. Wells is Missing", a 1974 episode of The Six Million Dollar Man, a savate master named Pierre fights with Steve Austin, using the original kicks-only style of the art.

In Marvel Comics, the criminal mercenary Batroc the Leaper, an adversary of Captain America and mentor of Gwen Poole, is a master of savate, training the latter. The X-Men character Gambit is trained in savate.

In the issue "Flight 714" of The Adventures of Tintin, Professor Calculus states that he used to be proficient in savate in his younger years. However, when attempting a kick, he ends up falling terribly, prompting stunned reactions from the onlookers. Dazed, Calculus remarks that he is out of practice. In "The Black Island", Tintin himself kicks a villain and calls it a savate move.

In the 1967 novel Logan's Run, protagonist Logan 3 often uses savate kicks for self-defense.

In DC Comics, the character Nightwing is a martial arts expert whose many skills include savate.

In the Japanese manga series Medaka Box, Zenkichi Hitoyoshi is a master of savate, and emphasizes its Open Handed Style Techniques with his "Altered God Mode: Model Zenkichi" which makes his hands as sharp as blades.

In the manga series Kengan Omega, Nicholas Le Banner uses a martial art he calls 'Sahate', created by incorporating techniques from Fencing, Savate, and Karate.

In the manga series One Piece, Sanji uses a martial art consisting exclusively of precise kicks using the toe or heel called the "Black Leg" style. While not textually based on savate, individual techniques have names in French, and the character's other interests draw from mainstream French culture (such as cuisine and wine).

Ash Crimson from The King of Fighters fights in a basic savate style that uses his own green flames. Ash himself is portrayed by SNK as a character with an unknown origin, because his lineage as descendant of Saiki (Those from the Past's leader), but it says too that he was raised by the Blanctorche clan, a French family.

Remy from Street Fighter III: 3rd Strike uses savate in a majority of his kick normals, combined with charge command specials reminiscent of Guile and Charlie Nash. His kick normals have a long reach but are slow and punishable, placing him low among competitive 3rd Strike tier lists.

John Crawley from Art of Fighting and The King of Fighters uses savate in his martial arts style.

In the Tekken series, Brazilian character Katarina Alves uses savate as her fighting syle.

In the mid- to late 1980s, WWF commentator Gorilla Monsoon would often refer to the reverse kicks thrown by the French-Canadian Rougeau Brothers as "savate kicks."

Ulrich Stern, occasionally alongside his good friend Yumi Ishiyama, is a practitioner of the French martial art in the 2003-2007 French animated show Code Lyoko.

In early Alone in the Dark series of survival horror games, the main protagonist Edward Carnby used savate as an unarmed combat method.

In the 1984 film Karate Kid, Daniel LaRusso is taken down in the final competition by an opponent who knows savate; even though he had been warned, this happened because the kick came from an unexpected direction, not being a normal karate move.

== Influence on other martial arts ==
Bruce Lee studied savate and included many techniques to his own Jeet Kune Do style. Mixed martial arts also had influence in a similar matter, in UFC 1 world-champion savateur Gerard Gordeau participated, reaching the finals where he lost to Royce Gracie. He supported and trained many future Dutch MMA fighters. Other savateurs have competed in MMA, such as Bellator Light Heavyweight Champion Christian M'Pumbu, Karl Amoussou and Cheick Kongo.

== See also ==
- Federation Internationale de Savate
- Shoot boxing
- Shoot Boxing World Tournament 1995
- Shoot Boxing World Tournament 2010
- Shoot Boxing – S-Cup 1996
- Girls S-Cup
- Bare-knuckle boxing
- Bare Knuckle Fighting Championship
