= Federation Internationale de Savate =

Sport world governing body

- Sport: Savate
- Jurisdiction: International
- Abbreviation: FISav
- Founded: 23 March 1985
- Headquarters: France
- Location: Thiais, France
- President: Julie Gabriel
- Vice president(s): Joel Dhumez; Gilles Le Duigou
- Secretary: Martin O'Malley,

Official website
- fisavate.org

The International Savate Federation (Federation Internationale de Savate) is the world governing body for the sport of Savate. The organization is dedicated to the promotion of the sport of savate and canne de combat. It currently has 63 member countries. The organization holds biannual World and Continental championships, while their member countries hold national competitions.

== History ==
During the 1880s and 1890s Joseph Charlemont and Lois Albert synthesized the various savate methods and moves and created the "academic style" of the sports, but were opposed to adjusting it to fit the modern demands of the sport. By 1944 there were two separate views of the sport of savate: the white collar practitioners who were in favor of full contact ring fighting, and the academically oriented practitioners who opposed this.

In 1965 the "Comité National de Boxe Française" was founded. The two philosophies competed for control of the organization. In 1973 CNBF became the "Fédération Nationale de Boxe Française" under the control of the academic camp. Their opponents founded a new organization, the "Fédération Nationale de Savate-Boxe-Française". In 1976 the French government gave the official teaching rights to the academic camp.

In March 1985 the two camps came together to found the "Fédération Internationale de Boxe Française Savate", which was renamed to Fédération Internationale de Savate in October 1999.

== Structure ==
All 63 member countries affiliated with Federation Internationale de Savate hold voting power in the General Assembly, which is held every two years. An extraordinary meeting of the general assembly may be called by the board of directors or it may be requested by 3/4 of the member countries.

At the meeting of the General Assembly management reports are presented, and discussion is held concerning the financial and legal situation of the organization. The General Assembly is the body that votes the president into power and which chooses its board of directors.

The organization itself if administered by the board of directors, who are a president, one or two vice-presidents, a Secretary General, a Treasurer, and a number of other persons who make up 20 members of the board of directors.

== Rules and techniques ==
In savate only strikes with the fists and foot kicks are allowed, unlike kickboxing or muay thai which allow strikes with knees and shins as well.

English	French
Salute	Salut
Guard	Garde
Jab	Direct
Cross	Crochet
Calf kick	Fouetté
Uppercut	Uppercut
Front kick	Chassé frontal
Side kick	Chassé latéral
Wheel kick	Revers latéral
Shin kick	Coup De Pied Bas
Parry	Parad Bloqué
Kick catch	Parad Chasseé

== Presidents ==
- Jean-Marie Rousseau 1985–1989
- Alain Salomon 1989–1992
- Michel Roger 1992–2001
- Alexandre Walnier 2001–2003
- Jean Houel 2003–2007
- Gilles Le Duigou 2007–2010
- Julie Gabriel 2010–

== World Championships ==
Main: Savate#Events

=== 2019 World Championship ===
The 2019 World Championship qualifications were held in Hammamet, Tunisia. The Championship itself was held in Hammamet, Milan, Vandoeuvre, La Motte-Servolex, Perpignan, Dakar and Tunis. Both the male and female fighters competed across eight different weight categories.

Men	First place	Second place	Third place	Women	First place	Second place	Third place
56 kg	(France) Mathieu Boucher	(Japan) Kenta Funayama	(Croatia) Dario Kontak (Tunisia) Aziz Hamraoui	48 kg	(France) Chloe Nandy	(Tunisia) Ibtissem Smii	(Russia) Karina Tatianchenko (Guinea-Bissau) Catherina Monteiro
60 kg	(Russia) Sergei Shcherbachenko	(Morocco) Rayane Imassoudat	(Romania) Gabriel Cobzaru (France) Miguel Colome	52 kg	(France) Meghane Amouri	(Japan) Mariko Hara	(Belgium) Rebecca Mandefu Mayol (Croatia) Lucija Regwat
65 kg	(France) Amine Feddal	(Russia) Narek Babadzhanian	(Serbia) Radoje Stevanović (China) Yin Wang	56 kg	(Italy) Chiara Vincis	(France) Flora Yang	(Serbia) Kristina Džolić (Ukraine) Alina Anduschenko
70 kg	(France) Damien Fabregas	(Serbia) Jovan Stevanović	(Morocco) Amine Ziani (Azerbaijan) Nurlan Gadimov	60 kg	(France) Audrey Guillaume	(Ukraine) Hanna Kupina	(Italy) Sofia Cavallo (Tunisia) Ghoffane Rezzni
75 kg	(Mali) Mohamed Diaby	(Russia) Iurii Zamirkhora	(Serbia) Ognjen Rauković (Croatia) Ivica Jakopić	65 kg	(France) Sara Surrel	(Tunisia) Amal Abdessalem	(Croatia) Monika Babić
80 kg	(France) Cristopher Brugiroux	(Russia) Nikolai Iarantcev	(China) Meng Ding (Belgium) Leny Krokos	70 kg	(France) Lorna Sincere	(Serbia) Tijana Vuković	(Tunisia) Thoraya Elbouzidi
85 kg	(France) Matteo Luca	(Ukraine) Dmyrov Bulgakov	(Azerbaijan) Tural Bayramov (Russia) Alexey Loginov	75 kg	(Tunisia) Ahlem Grisset	(Iran) Mahnaz Amini	
85+ kg	(France) Romain Falendry	(Serbia) Dragoljub Bovan	(Ukraine) Iurii Sarazhan (Iran) Seyed Mehdi Hoseini	75+ kg	(Tunisia) Molka Ayedi	(France) Melissa Quelfennec	(Mauritius) Sharone Clair (Iran) Elham Abdi

=== 2017 World Championship ===
The 2017 World Championship qualification was held in Varaždin, Croatia. The Championship itself was held in Martinique, Vandoeuvre, La Motte-Servolex, Hangzhou and Toulouse. Male fighters competed across eight weight classes and female fighters competed across seven weight classes.

Men	First place	Second place	Third place	Women	First place	Second place	Third place
56 kg	(China) Yuan Peng	(France) Yanis Goucef	(Japan) Kenta Funayama (Spain) Alberto Mendez Silva	48 kg	(France) Chloe Nandy	(Russia) Karina Tatianchenko	(Belgium) Jennifer Galopin (Italy) Elisa Picollo
60 kg	(Russia) Narek Babadzhanian	(France) Amine Boutchiche	(Belgium) Yoann Collart (Japan) Keisuke Takahashi	52 kg	(France) Margot Bouyjou	(Belgium) Rebecca Mandefu	(Ukraine) Anastasia Konovalchuck (Japan) Mariko Hara
65 kg	(France) Amine Feddal	(Croatia) Luka Lešković	(Mauritius) Brian Francois Fils (Russia) Bekkhan Sadaev	56 kg	(France) Mathilde Magnier	(Italy) Chiara Vincis	(Iran) Saeedeh Fardsanei (China) Junjia Li
70 kg	(Mali) Ibrahim Konate	(France) Charles Denis	(Iran) Hossein Hayani Lichaei (Russia) Ilia Freimanov	60 kg	(France) Maurine Atef	(Serbia) Valentina Keri	(Austria) Ceri Greimel (Iran) Roghieh Soltaninegar
75 kg	(France) Kevin Albertus	(Ukraine) Mykita Radionov	(Russia) Romain Malgin (Croatia) Antun Viličić	65 kg	(France) Cyrielle Girodias	(Croatia) Marijana Kosi	(Iran) Mina Karami (Tunisia) Sabrine Geblewi
80 kg	(France) Cristopher Brugiroux	(China) Leilei Yuan	(Serbia) Goran Sučević (Republic of Ireland) Andrew Griffin	73 kg	(France) Kanelle Leger	(Serbia) Tijana Vuković	(United Kingdom) Morgan Alexander
85 kg	(France) Romain Falendry	(Iran) Jamshid Ashgar Givehchi	(Bulgaria) Duke Nwamerue (Croatia) Marko Gospočić	73+ kg	(Tunisia) Wided Younsi	(Slovenia) Klara Rosić	
85+ kg	(Cameroon) Pharelle Akouan	(Russia) Nikolai Nikitenko	(Tunisia) Ramza Kebir (Iran) Seyed Mehdi Hoseini				

=== 2015 World Championship ===
The World Championship qualifications were held in La Roche-sur-Yon, France. The Championship itself was held in Martinique, Saint Petersburg, Vandoeuvre and Amiens.

Men	First place	Second place	Third place	Women	First place	Second place	Third place
56 kg	(France) Jerry Bart	(China) Yuan Peng	(Croatia) Antonio Horvatić (Mauritius) Geraldo Thomasoo	48 kg	(France) Chloe Nandy	(Italy) Elisa Picollo	(France) Rebecca Mandefu (Romania) Elena Mitrofan
60 kg	(France) Jonathan Bonnet	(Russia) Narek Babadzhanian	(China) Lige Teng (Spain) Manuel Garcia Sanchez	52 kg	(Cuba) Cynthia Gonzalez	(France) Adeline Robin	(Ukraine) Anastasia Konovalchuck (Japan) Mariko Hara
65 kg	(France) Aziz Abdelaoui	(Spain) Adoni Iglesias	(Italy) Ivan Sechi (Russia) Dimitry Prudov	56 kg	(France) Jacqueline Beroud	(Russia) Anna Volobueva	(Serbia) Jovana Milovanović (China) Li Xiaoxiao
70 kg	(France) Ludovic Nassibou	(Ukraine) Artur Zakirko	(Russia) Ivan Muratkin (Serbia) Damjan Marković	60 kg	(France) Marion Montanari	(Russia) Rimma Golubeva	(Italy) Veronica Parisi (Slovenia) Vida Samotorcan
75 kg	(France) Redouane Derras	(Croatia) Antun Viličić	(China) Yong Xu (Morocco) Marouane Aatifi	65 kg	(France) Cyrielle Girodias	(China) Xuetao Yuan	(Serbia) Teodora Manić (Finland) Annukka Volotinen
80 kg	(France) Dylan Colin	(Iran) Ali Reza Jadidi	(China) Bing Liu	70 kg	(France) Kanelle Leger	(Italy) Serena Burgio	(United Kingdom) Morgan Alexander
85 kg	(France) Herbert Danois	(Montenegro) Milos Golić	(Croatia) Silvio Horvat (Belgium) Alain Van De Markt	75 kg	(Croatia) Nives Radić	(Mauritius) Sharone Clair	
85+ kg	(France) Bastien Colin	(Italy) Giuseppe Mongiardino	(Croatia) Nino Vladušić (Serbia) Jovan Ikić	75+ kg	(Tunisia) Wided Younsi	(Mauritius) Karine Sandrine Berry	

=== 2013 World Championship ===
The 2013 Male World Championships were held in Clermont-Ferrand, France, while the Female World Championships were held in both Clermont-Ferrand and Hainan, China. Men competed across eight, and women across seven weight classes.

Men	First place	Second place	Third place	Women	First place	Second place	Third place
56 kg	(France) Ousmane Sarr	(Madagascar) Laurent Johny Rakotondrabe	(Italy) Richard Carbonne (Ukraine) Maksym Fatych	48 kg	(Italy) Elisa Picollo	(Tunisia) Ouided Abdelaziz	(Madagascar) Bernadette Ravaoarisoa (Japan) Mariko Hara
60 kg	(France) Jonathan Bonnet	(Ukraine) Viktor Slavinsky	(Croatia) Predrag Šimunec (China) Yang Ling	52 kg	(France) Margot Bouyjou	(Russia) Evgeniya Siviri	(Canada) Lydia Couture (Italy) Marta Murru
65 kg	(France) Laurent Olivier Crescence	(Republic of the Congo) Boris Essere	(Romania) Alexandru Nita (Russia) Ruslan Abdinov	56 kg	(France) Anissa Meksen	(Belgium) Celine Iglesis	(Russia) Olga Gavrilova (Italy) Elisa Barbini
70 kg	(France) Georgy Fernante	(Ukraine) Dmytro Romanenko	(Serbia) Damjan Marković (Russia) Georgy Shavdatuashvili	60 kg	(France) Cyrielle Giordias	(Russia) Rimma Golubeva	(Croatia) Marija Petrić
75 kg	(France) Tony Ancelin	(Russia) Andrei Studenikov	(Ukraine) Volodymyr Skopovsky (Morocco) Marouane Aatifi	65 kg	(France) Julie Burton	(Finland) Annukka Volotinen	(Morocco) Nizha Sbai (Croatia) Stefica Bubnjarić
80 kg	(Croatia) Damir Plantić	(Russia) Alexander Sidorkin	(Tunisia) Mohamed Seif Khalifa (Turkey) Cihan Akagunduz	70 kg	(France) Blandine Jouard	(Italy) Serena Burgio	(China) Yudan Bao (Russia) Iana Shmidt
85 kg	(Russia) Alexey Sachivko	(Ukraine) Mykyta Chub	(Romania) Romain Falendry (Serbia) Zoran Romac	75 kg	(Croatia) Nives Radić	(Tunisia) Wided Younsi	(Slovenia) Nina Vehar
85+ kg	(France) Fabrice Aurieng	(Croatia) Zvonimir Martić	(Italy) Giuseppe Mongiardino (Ukraine) Viktor Goriachkun				

=== 2011 World Championship ===
The 2011 Male World Championships were held in Milan, Italy, across eight weight classes.

Men	First place	Second place	Third place
56 kg	(France) Dimitri Suire	(Madagascar) Laurent Johny Rakotondrabe	(Italy) Lorenzo Parodi (Mali) Paly Dembele
60 kg	(Croatia) Predrag Šimunec	(France) Ozkan Kuyruk	(Russia) Ruslan Abdimov
65 kg	(Mali) Ibrahim Konate	(France) Gagny Baradji	(Russia) Victor Vezhlivtcev (Italy) Roberto Musso
70 kg	(France) Mohamed Diaby	(Croatia) Goran Borović	(Madagascar) Léopold César Adrianjaka (Serbia) Igor Sivoljicki
75 kg	(France) Tony Ancelin	(Russia) Andrei Studenikov	(Croatia) Anton Viličić (Tunisia) Issam Barhoumi
80 kg	(France) Wendy Faure	(Croatia) Damir Plantić	(Serbia) Ljubomir Cestić (Russia) Alexey Sachivko
85 kg	(France) Nabil Fajjari	(Montenegro) Miloš Golić	(Serbia) Branislav Plavšić (Belgium) Geoffrey Delhez
85+ kg	(France) Frédéric Heini	(Croatia) Agron Preteni	(Italy) Julian Badia

== See also ==
- Savate
- Canne de combat
