= Chiara Vincis =

Italian kickboxer

- Born: 17 June 1995 (age 31); Savona, Italy
- Nickname: Facoch
- Nationality: Italian
- Height: 1.67 m (5 ft 5 1/2 in)
- Weight: 57 kg (126 lb; 9 st 0 lb)
- Division: Bantamweight; Featherweight
- Style: Kickboxing, savate
- Fighting out of: Savona, Italy
- Team: Kickboxing Savate Savona
- Trainer: Andrea Scaramozzino
- Years active: 2015 - present

Kickboxing record
- Total: 101
- Wins: 83
- By knockout: 4
- Losses: 17
- Draws: 1

Mixed martial arts record
- Total: 1
- Losses: 1

Amateur record
- Total: 19
- Wins: 13
- By knockout: 4
- Losses: 3
- Draws: 2
- No contests: 1

Chiara Vincis (born 17 June 1995) is an Italian kickboxer and the current ISKA World Featherweight Freestyle champion.

She is the WKU European 60 kg champion, the 2017 FIS Savate World championship runner up and the 2019 FIS Savate World Champion.

She is the #1 female savate 56 kg fighter in the world, as of February 2020.

== Kickboxing career ==
Chiara Vincis won the ISKA World Kickboxing Freestyle Featherweight Title with a unanimous decision win over Nahed Kharchi.

Vincis dropped a decision against Martine Michieletto during their fight at Iron Fight Vol3: Muay Thai Time.

She captured the WKU European 60 kg title with a decision win over Jessica Marazzi.

During Oktagon S Selection she managed a decision victory over Perla Bragagnolo.

She fought the future Glory champion Anissa Meksen for the ISKA K1 Bantamweight title, losing the fight by a unanimous decision.

During the International Fight Show 2017 she fought the WMO champion Cindy Silvestre. She won the fight by a unanimous decision.

Participating in the 2018 Italian Championship, she netted a win against Melissa Landini and Sara Falchetti to win the tournament.

During PRAETORIA FIGHT NIGHT Vincis participated in a four women tournament. In the semi-finals she defeated Perla Bragagnolo, and in the finals she defeated Vittoria Di Mauro.

In June 2019 she challenged for the ISKA European title against Emma Gongora. She lost the fight by a unanimous decision.

At the end of 2019 Vincis fought Flora Yanga for the Savate World Championship. She won the title by a unanimous decision.

During the Ultimate Muay Thai event, Vincis faced the former Enfusion champion Aurore Dos Santos. She won the fight by a unanimous decision. Vincis faced Sveva Melillo during the Petrosyanmania event in early 2020. Melillo would win the fight by a unanimous decision.

== Championships and accomplishments ==
- World Association of Kickboxing Organizations
  - WAKO Pro K-1 Italy -59 kg Championship
- International Sports Karate Association
  - ISKA World Featherweight Kickboxing Freestyle Championship
- World Kickboxing and Karate Union
  - WKU European 60 kg Championship
- Fight1
  - Fight1 Italian K1 Tournament Winner
- Federation Internationale de Savate
  - (silver) 2017 FIS 56 kg World Championship Runner-up
  - (gold) 2019 FIS 56 kg World Championship Winner
  - (gold) 2023 FIS 60 kg World Championship Winner

== Kickboxing record ==
Kickboxing record
58 wins, 27 losses, 1 draw
Date	Result	Opponent	Event	Location	Method	Round	Time
3 Oct 2025	Loss	(Croatia) Katarina Klarić	Golden Fight 10	Split, Croatia	Decision (Split)	4	2:00
For the Savate World -60kg title.
7 Jun 2025	Win	(Italy) Linda Segni	Road to Fight Clubbing Battaglia sotto la Lanterna II	Genoa, Italy	Decision (Unanimous)	4	3:00
Defends the WAKO Pro K-1 Italy -59kg title.
10 Nov 2024	Loss	(Tunisia) Ghofrane Abdellaoui	ONE Night PRO - Road to Fight Clubbing	Casalecchio di Reno, Italy	Decision	3	3:00
10 Nov 2024	Win	(France) Morgane Pech	Savate European Championships Final	Longwy, France	Decision	4	2:00
Wins the Savate European -60kg title.
15 Jun 2024	Win	(Italy) Anna Lia Moretti	Battaglia sotto la Lanterna	Genoa, Italy	Decision (Unanimous)	5	3:00
Wins the WAKO Pro K-1 Italy -59kg title.
9 Dec 2023	Win	(Romania) Alexandra Gaburel	International Fight Show	Loano, Italy	Decision (Unanimous)	3	3:00
7 Oct 2023	Win	(France) Samira Bounhar	S1 pro	Paris, France	Decision (Majority)	4	2:00
Wins the FISAV Savate World -60kg title.
10 Jun 2023	Loss	(France) Aurore Llorens	La Nuit du Kick	Bastia, France	Decision (Unanimous)	3	3:00
22 Apr 2023	Win	(Romania) Alexandra Gaburel	Ringmania	Sanremo, Italy	Decision (Unanimous)	3	3:00
19 Mar 2022	Loss	(England) Lucy Payne	SKS Empire Fight Night II	England	Decision	5	3:00
7 Aug 2021	Loss	(England) Niamh Kinehan	Yokkao 50	London, United Kingdom	Decision	5	3:00
10 Jul 2021	Win	(Italy) Ludovica Ciarpaglini	Antares FIght Night	Italy	Decision	3	3:00
1 Feb 2020	Loss	(Italy) Sveva Melillo	Petrosyanmania Gold Edition	Milan, Italy	Decision (Unanimous)	3	3:00
30 Nov 2019	Win	(France) Aurore Dos Santos	Ultimate Muay Thai	Strasbourg, France	Decision (Unanimous)	5	2:00
26 Oct 2019	Win	(Italy) Flora Yanga	Petrosyanmania	Milan, Italy	Decision (Unanimous)	5	2:00
FIS Savate 56 kg World Championship.
15 Sep 2018	Win	(China) Yang Yang	Glory of Heroes 34: Tongling	Anhui, China	Decision (Split)	3	3:00
Jun 2018	Loss	(France) Emma Gongora	ISKA Title Fight	Milan, Italy	Decision (Unanimous)	5	2:00
For the European ISKA title.
May 2018	Win	(Italy) Vittoria Di Mauro	PRAETORIA FIGHT NIGHT	Aosta, Italy	Decision (Unanimous)	3	3:00
PFN Tournament finals.
May 2018	Win	(France) Perla Bragagnolo	PRAETORIA FIGHT NIGHT	Aosta, Italy	Decision (Unanimous)	3	3:00
PFN Tournament semi finals.
Apr 2018	Win	(Italy) Melissa Landini	Italian Championship	Rome, Italy	Decision (Unanimous)	3	3:00
Italian tournament finals.
Apr 2018	Win	(Italy) Sara Falchetti	Italian Championship	Rome, Italy	Decision (Unanimous)	3	3:00
Italian tournament semi finals.
24 Mar 2018	Win	(Italy) Jessica Marazzi	Petrosyanmania Gold Edition	Switzerland	Decision	5	3:00
Wins WKU K-1 European title.
Dec 2017	Loss	(France) Mathilde Migner	Final World Championship	France	Decision (Unanimous)	3	3:00
30 Sep 2017	Win	(France) Cindy Silvestre	International Fight Show 2017	Loano, Italy	Decision (Unanimous)	3	3:00
21 Apr 2017	Win	(France) Sarah Surrel	SB 13	Marseille, France	Decision (Unanimous)	3	3:00
8 Apr 2017	Loss	(France) Anissa Meksen	Victory World Series: Oktagon Torino	Turin, Italy	Decision (Unanimous)	5	3:00
For the ISKA K1 Bantamweight title.
11 Mar 2017	Win	(France) Perla Bragagnolo	Oktagon S Selection	Alassio, Italy	Decision (Unanimous)	3	3:00
25 Feb 2017	Draw	(Romania) Alina Niță	La Notte Dei Gladiatori 5	Lecce, Italy	Decision (Unanimous)	3	3:00
3 Dec 2016	Win	(Italy) Donatella Panu	Fight Code	Loano, Italy	Decision (Unanimous)	3	3:00
5 Nov 2016	Win	(Italy) Chiara Laurora	The Destroyers 2	Milan, Italy	Decision (Unanimous)	3	3:00
23 Oct 2017	Loss	(France) Jacqueline Berroud	?	Savona, Italy	Decision (Unanimous)	5	3:00
For the FIS Savate European 56 kg title.
8 Oct 2016	Win	(Cuba) Cynthia González	?	Lorient, France	Decision (Unanimous)	3	3:00
18 Sep 2016	Win	(Italy) Jessica Marazzi	?	Biel/Bienne, Switzerland	Decision (Unanimous)	5	3:00
For the WKU European 60 kg title.
7 Jul 2016	Win	(Italy) Michela Socci	Seconds Out	Parma, Italy	Decision (Unanimous)	3	3:00
13 Mar 2016	Loss	(Italy) Martine Michieletto	Iron Fight Vol3: Muay Thai Time	Cogoleto, Italy	Decision (Unanimous)	3	3:00
20 Feb 2016	Win	(France) Nahed Kharchi	ISKA World Kickboxing title	Nice, France	Decision (Unanimous)	5	3:00
Wins the ISKA World Kickboxing Freestyle Featherweight Title.
19 Dec 2015	Win	(Italy) Chiara Sammicheli	?	Savona, Italy	Decision (Unanimous)	5	3:00
Wins the Fight1 Italian K1 Title.
29 Nov 2016	Loss	(Italy) Veronica Vernocchi	Fight Code	Loano, Italy	Decision (Unanimous)	3	3:00
Legend: Win Loss Draw/No contest Notes

== See also ==
- List of female kickboxers
- FIS Savate World Championships
