= Bernard Friery =

American killer (1844–1866)

- Born: February 17, 1844; New York City, New York, U.S.
- Died: August 17, 1866 (aged 22); New York City, New York, U.S.
- Cause of death: Hanging
- Other name: Barney Friary
- Occupation: Saloon keeper
- Known for: New York criminal and underworld figure who murdered Harry Lazarus in 1865.

Bernard "Barney" Friery (February 17, 1844 – August 17, 1866) was a New York City criminal and independent gang leader during the 1850s and 1860s.

== Early life ==
Bernard "Barney" Friery was born on February 17, 1844, in New York City to Irish parents. At a young age, he worked at a butcher on 18th street and 3rd avenue for some years. He also worked as an electioneer to help local ward candidates. He invested his money in a saloon called "10-40 Loan" on East Houston Street and worked there as a barkeep. He was Catholic.

== Murder ==
Along five or six others, including James Clark, James MacDonald and John "California Jack" Gallen, Friery entered the "X 10 U 8" (read: extenuate) saloon, adjacent to Friery's saloon on East Houston Street between 3 and 4 A.M. on January 3, 1865. The saloon was owned by boxer Henry "Harry" Lazarus. One of the men, California Jack, offered a wager of $100 challenging anyone in the bar to a fight with one of the gang members. When no one responded to their offer, California Jack offered $10 to any man who could take the owner Henry Lazarus's pistol away from him. Having no pistol on him, Lazarus declined their offer.

Reportedly "beastly drunk", Friery then walked toward Lazarus offering to shake his hand and, when he refused, stabbed the saloon owner in the throat with a dirk, killing him instantly. He was arrested hours later at another saloon.

== Trial and execution ==
Friery was arraigned in the Court of General Sessions before Recorder of New York City John T. Hoffman and Judge Abraham Russell. His lawyers were John McKeon, John Sedgwick, and former judge Sidney H. Stuart. He was convicted of first degree murder and sentenced to death on February 17, 1865. He was executed by hanging at The Tombs on August 17, 1866.

== See also ==
- Capital punishment in New York (state)
- Capital punishment in the United States
- List of people executed in New York
