= Harry Lazarus =

New York saloon keeper, thief and underworld figure murdered by Barney Friery

- Born: 1839; England
- Died: January 2, 1865 (aged 26); Manhattan, New York, US
- Cause of death: Murdered
- Occupation: Saloon keeper
- Known for: English-born saloon keeper, thief and underworld figure in New York City during the 1850s and early 1860s; his murder by Barney Friery was one of the highly publicized trials in the city prior to the end of the American Civil War.
- Parent: Israel "London Izzy" Lazarus
- Relatives: John Lazarus; Israel Lazarus, Jr.

Harry Lazarus (1839 – January 2, 1865) was an English-born American pugilist, saloon keeper, thief and underworld figure in New York City during the 1850s and early 1860s. He is sometimes confused with his father, famed pugilist Israel "London Izzy" Lazarus, and was one of his three sons along with John and Izzy Lazarus, Jr. His murder by Barney Friery, and subsequent trial, in 1865 was one of the most notorious crimes in the city's history prior to the end of the American Civil War.

== Biography ==
Lazarus came to the US with his father and two brothers when Izzy Lazarus, Sr. fought Owen Swift in 1850. He would briefly follow in his father's footsteps, fighting a prizefight in Canada during 1857, but instead left that career to go into business in New York City. It was alleged that around this time that he had killed a man in California, arrested then fled the state while on bail. Lazarus was enlisted in Colonel Elmer E. Ellsworth's Fire Zouaves for a time during the American Civil War, but returned to New York where he opened a saloon, the "X 10 U. 8" (phonetically spelled "extenuate"), on East Houston Street. He lived for a time in Washoe Valley, Nevada Territory. He was shot twice by Epitacis A. Maldonado and injured two fingers on his right hand on September 23, 1863.

Traditional accounts, such as those of Herbert Asbury in Gangs of New York (1928), claimed Lazarus became involved with thieves and confidence men soon after his arrival in New York. One of these acquaintances, Barney Friery, stabbed and killed him during an argument at Lazarus' saloon in the early morning hours of January 6, 1865. According to Asbury, the incident had originated from "a dispute over a plug hat full of jewelry, which London Izzy had stolen from a jewelry store after smashing the store window with a brick".

The trial was held the following month, lasting three-days, and involved Assistant District Attorney Gunning J. Bedford, Jr. and Judge John T. Hoffman, as well as Lazarus' father Israel who testified for the prosecution. Harry Lazarus' bartender, Henry Connell served as one of the prosecution's star witnesses. Connell testified that on the night of the murder, while tending bar, Lazarus entered the saloon with five or six other men from his place of business next door. One of Friery's companions, California Jack, offered a challenge to the room betting $100 "that I've got a man here that will lick any man in the room". When no one responded, Jack turned to the owner and said "I'll bet $10 that I've got a man that will take that pistol away from you, Harry."

Lazarus answered "No you haven't, because I have no pistol" and opened both his coats to show he was indeed unarmed. A customer then ordered some cigars and Connell left to fetch them. As the bartender turned around however, he heard Friery say "You are a good little man, Harry" and saw him "drawing a knife out of Harry's neck". Connell rushed over and put a towel around his neck to stop the bleeding, but Lazarus died almost immediately. He later identified Friery, California Jack and two other men, James McDonald and James Clark, but recognized none of the others. Connell elaborated that Friery had threatened Lazarus several days earlier. On one of these occasions, Friery had attacked one of his dogs, a black Newfoundland, and used an ice pick to break out some of its teeth. The previous morning of the murder, Friery entered had taken a knife and stuck it into the counter of Lazarus' bar and said "that knife would be the death of someone around here". This would be substantiated by an additional witnesses.

Connell, who had fallen ill, was taken to New York Hospital following his testimony and did not participate further in the trial. Assistant District Attorney Bedford called additional witnesses however, including Christopher Richards who also saw the murder and went for a police officer with John Riley. Richard Birmingham, a local coach driver, testified that he had driven the sleigh which took two of the men involved, McDonald and Clark, to Lazarus' place and then took all three away from the saloon after the murder. He also testified that these men were very intoxicated, especially McDonald and Clark, and that he overheard one of the men say "He is dead now, the son of a bitch!".

Lazarus' other bartenders, Dennis Kerwan and Thomas R. Walton, both stated that Friery had been to the saloon on previous occasions. Walton recalled an incident when Friery, admittedly drunk, broke a mustard pot after throwing it against the wall. The arresting officer, Patrolman John Dwyer, testified that he pursued the sleigh driven by Richard Birmingham and followed Friery into a saloon on 118th Street. Upon confronting the suspect inside, Dwyer claimed, Friery admitted to the killing telling him "Yes, I have killed him and I will dance at his wake". This and other evidence would result in Friery's conviction of first-degree manslaughter on February 18, 1865. He was sentenced to death on March 31, but a writ of error delayed his execution pending his appeal in June, and Friery was hanged in a public execution at The Tombs on the morning of August 17, 1866.
