= Michel Casseux =

- Born: 1794
- Died: 1869 (aged 74–75)
- Nationality: French
- Style: Savate

Other information
- Notable students: Charles Lecour

Michel Casseux, also known as "Pisseux" (1794–1869) was a Savate instructor. He is widely considered one of the pioneers of the sport, and is even credited as its inventor.

== Life ==
Based on streetfighting techniques he developed around 1820 "L'art de la savate". He banned certain street-fighting manners and developed a regulated system for self-defense and competition. Due to his efforts the new sport even became attractive to members of the French upper class who consequently attended his Savate gym. Casseux elaborated the first training system for Savate and his gym (or "salle") was the first official Savate academy ever.

== Legacy ==
It was his student and successor Charles Lecour who eventually added boxing techniques to Savate and made it what is nowadays established as French Boxing.
