= Francois Pennacchio =

French professional kickboxer

- Born: Francois Pennacchio; 24 June 1965 (age 61)
- Height: 1.73 m (5 ft 8 in)
- Weight: 67 kg (148 lb; 10 st 8 lb)
- Division: Featherweight; Lightweight
- Style: Savate
- Team: Camp Mondiale Di Savate

Kickboxing record
- Total: 100
- Wins: 93
- Losses: 7

Francois Pennacchio (born June 24, 1965) is a French kickboxer who became WAKO champion in 1993 and 1998, and the ISKA champion in 1997. Known for his use of savate against other kickboxing styles such as muay thai, karate, and Dutch kickboxing, Pennacchio fought a total of 100 bouts against many famous kickboxers at that time, and helped popularized the use of savate in mainstream professional combat sports. Nowadays, he is considered to be one of the greatest savate fighters of all time.

== Biography ==
Francois Pennacchio was born in France in the year 1965. At an early age, he trained in the French martial art savate or French boxing, even becoming a savate champion in both 1991 and 1992. He later transitioned into mainstream kickboxing and was most active in the late 1990s to early 2000s. He fought for the World Association of Kickboxing Organizations, becoming their champion in 1993 and 1998, and the International Sport Kickboxing Association, becoming their champion in 1997.

In modern times, however, Pennacchio became known for his bouts against many legendary kickboxers during his time, many of whom were trained under different disciplines and styles of kickboxing. His specialty in the use of savate against other kickboxing styles made him a unique fighter during his career. Sascha Matuszak of Vice considers him to be one of the greatest savate fighters of all time.

=== Famous bouts ===
One of his most famous fights was his 1997 bout against muay thai fighter David Hergault. Both kickboxers were of French origin and the bout was fought under the ISKA promotion. Muay thai was a martial art that was well known in kickboxing tournaments for its powerful roundhouse kicks using shins. But Pennachio managed to win against Hergault through precise long range blows that knocked down the nak muay multiple times.

However, Pennachio's most famous fight was his match-up against Dutch kickboxer, Ramon Dekkers, in 1996. Dekkers is a legend in kickboxing and was one of the pioneers of the so-called Dutch kickboxing, a style that combines Western boxing with traditional Thai boxing. Expectation of the fight was that Pennacchio would not last more than a few minutes, but their fight lasted the whole bout. Pennacchio managed to keep his distance and score points through his savate sidekicks and sweeps. The fight ended in a unanimous decision for Pennacchio.

== Awards ==
Year	Title	Award
1991	Champion du monde de boxe française	Winner
1992	Champion du monde de boxe française	Winner
1993	WAKO Kickboxing Champion	Winner
1997	ISKA Kickboxing Champion	Winner
1998	WAKO Kickboxing Champion	Winner

== In other media ==
Pennacchio became the subject of, or was mentioned, in several books about martial arts, such as Osate la Savate: La nobles art de combat by Stefano Gennaccari and Artiste martial: Mon Tao de Bruce Lee au Mma by David Bertrand. In both books, his exploits and famous battles with many legendary kickboxers were detailed.
