= Charles Lecour =

French boxer

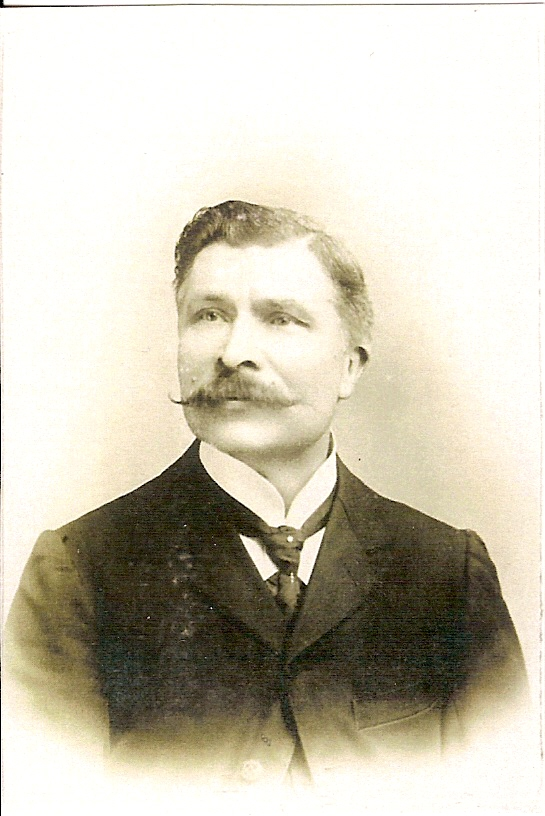
- Born: 1802
- Died: 1894 (aged 91–92)
- Nationality: French
- Style: Savate
- Teacher(s): Michel Casseux

Charles Lecour (1808 – 1894) was a French boxer. He began his studies of Savate at an early age and was a student of Michel Casseux, who merged Savate and English boxing to a fighting style he eventually called French Boxing.

== Life ==
While still in France Charles Lecour watched English boxing on a high level when he was a spectator of an official match Owen Swift vs. Jack Adams in 1838.

It has been reported that Lecour would have sparred with Owen Swift although Charles Lecour as a savateur was not used to exchanging fist blows. Due to Savate's roots in street fighting, Savateurs even held their guard low. In order to establish Savate as a fair sport Michel Casseux had dropped a number of fighting techniques that henceforth had been considered unsporting. Subsequently, fighting a boxer at very close range (infight), especially someone who had cause the deaths of two English boxers was difficult for him because the use of elbows or knees was no part of the sport version of Savate. Charles Lecour would mainly have to score with techniques that in English boxing should have led to his disqualification, and the fight result fueled Lecour to learn English boxing too.

Even so, Charles Lecour discovered that the previous evolution of Savate justified the addition of fistfight techniques. Moreover, he realised the compatibility of Savate and English boxing. Pursuing a synthesis of both kinds of fighting he trained English boxing with Jack Adams. Therefore, his new eclectic style could also be described as Anglo-French kickboxing.
Following his boxing training he returned to France where he opened his own gym in Montmartre and introduced boxing gloves which now have a unique meaning in Savate since they display (instead of belts as in many Asian fighting systems) the ranks and hereby symbolize that participation in competition is mandatory for a Savate student who wants to advance beyond beginner's degrees.

He and his brother Hubert Lecour (1820–1871) also organised public demonstrations of French Boxing and their schools were prosperous. Like Michel Casseux they also had particularly wealthy gentlemen among their students.

== Legacy ==
Charles Lecour's open-minded and pragmatic approach to martial arts and his according integration of boxing techniques into his inherited fighting style made him an early predecessor of Bruce Lee. But he was already succeeded during his lifetime by his student Joseph Charlemont who along with his son Charles Charlemont developed the French Boxing (respectively Anglo-French Boxing) as it is exercised up to this day.
