= Pierre Baruzy =

French boxer and manager

- Born: May 19, 1897; Amiens, France
- Died: 19 December 1994 (aged 97); Paris, France
- Known for: President of Fédération nationale de boxe française
- Spouse: Simone Maria-Sube (m. 1921)
- Relatives: House of Barozzi

Count Pierre Baruzy (Amiens, 19 May 1897 – Paris, 17 December 1994) was a manager and French boxing champion.

== Biography ==
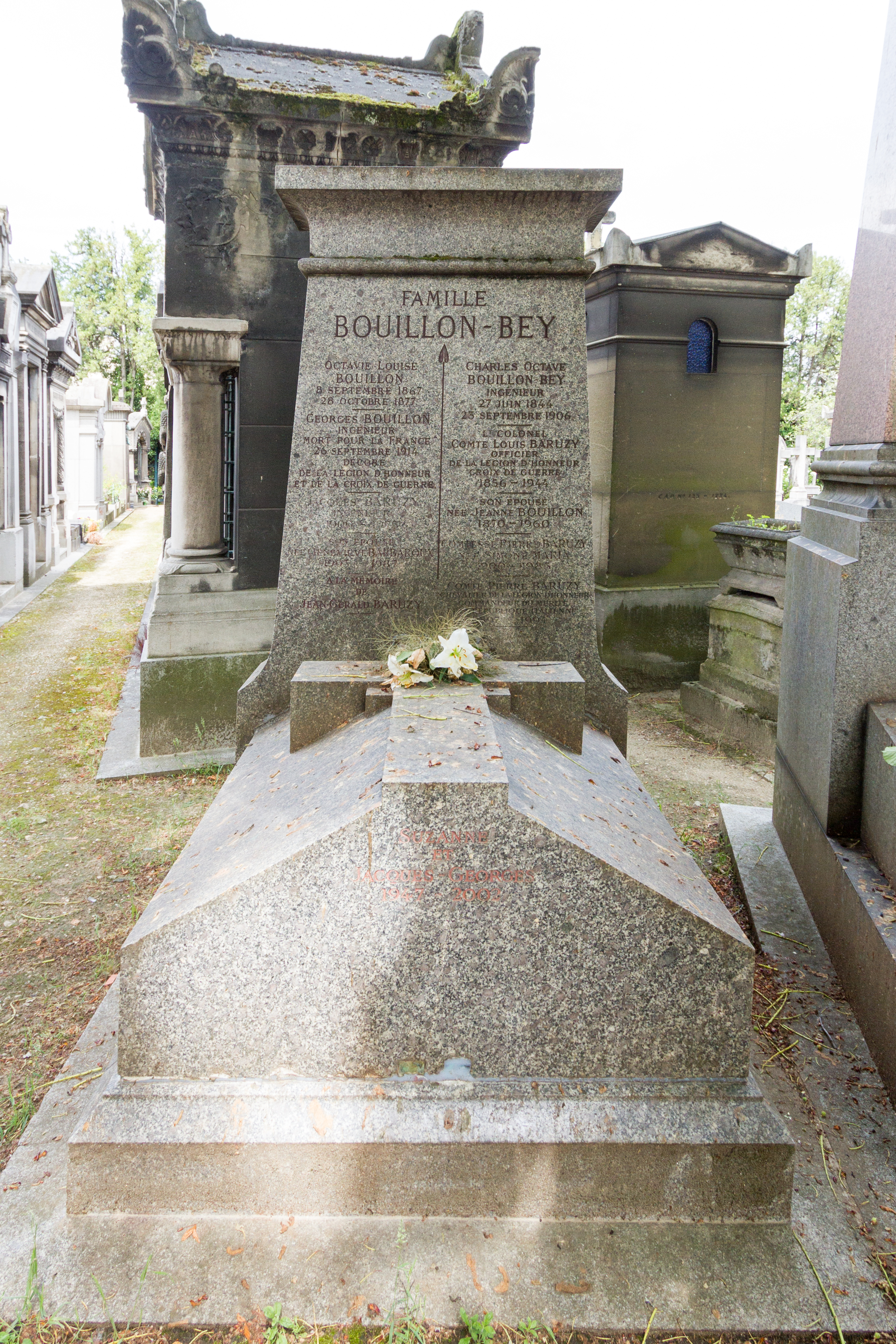
Burial at Passy Cemetery.

Of Italian origin, a descendant of a noble Venetian family, Pierre Barozzi (in French spelled Baruzy), entered the French boxing academy at the age of thirteen, where he was a pupil of Charles Charlemont and was named eleven times French champion of the weightlifting.

He participated in the 1924 Summer Olympics, the first Olympics to include a demonstration of French boxing (Savate). In 1930 he became president of the Académie de Boxe Française and in 1937 the last French Championship was held (until its rebirth in 1966) during which he obtained the title of Champion in all categories, beating middle-weight boxer and heavy. Between 1922 and 1935 he obtained eleven championship titles.

Pierre Baruzy joined the Resistance during the Second World War. He chaired the "JP workers commission"; Under the Occupation, Baruzy was appointed municipal councilor of Paris in December 1941 by the Minister of the Interior Pierre Pucheu, and became secretary of the municipal council in 1943. He was president of the Steering Committee of Timken (France) and Chancellor of the CIOS International Academy. As an industrialist he was president of the Compagnie des ASTD and member of the Board for Meules Norton.

He was arrested in August 1944 but was awarded the Resistance Medal. He claims in 1972 to have been in contact with General Revers, head of the Army Resistance Organization (ORA) and to have been a member since 1942 of the Buckmaster network. Baruzy claims to have rescued 11 airmen from the Allied forces whose planes were shot down by the German army. His resistance activities earned him the Medal of Freedom from General Eisenhower in 1945, as well as a Presidential Medal of Freedom from Ronald Reagan in 1984, making him the only Frenchman to have received medals from two American presidents.

He was active since 1945 in the National Committee of the French Organization (CNOF), which he chaired from 1952 to 1957, after having been its general secretary. He gave new impetus to the sport in the postwar period; in 1965 he became the founding president of the French National Boxing Committee which would be replaced in 1975 by the French Boxing Federation Savate (FFBFS e DA).

Baruzy received numerous civil and military awards throughout his career. He is buried in the tomb of the Bouillon-Bey family.

== Honors ==
- Croix de guerre 1914–1918 (France)
- Resistance Medal (1944)
- Medal of Freedom (1945)
- Presidential Medal of Freedom (1984)
- Knight of the Legion of Honour
- Commander of the Order of Merit of the Italian Republic
