= Shoot Boxing World Tournament 1995 =

- Promotion: Shoot Boxing
- Date: 31 January 1995
- Venue: Osaka Prefectural Gymnasium
- City: Osaka, Japan

Event chronology
Shoot Boxing World Tournament 1995	Shoot Boxing - S-Cup 1996

Shoot Boxing World Tournament 1995 or S-Cup 1995 was a shoot boxing event promoted by Caesar Takeshi. It was the inaugural (70kg/154lbs weight class) Shoot Boxing World Tournament, featuring an eight single elimination format, fought under Shoot Boxing Rules. In total there were eight fighters at the event, representing five countries. The tournament winner was Hiromu Yoshitaka who defeated Ron Belliveau in the final. The event was held at the Osaka Prefectural Gymnasium on Wednesday, 31 January 1995.

== Shoot Boxing World Tournament 1995 ==
Quarter Finals
(Japan) Makoto Ohe
(Netherlands) Dylan Gravenberg	WIN
(Japan) Takashi Abe (boxing)
(United States) Ron Belliveau	WIN
(Thailand) Bovi Chorwaikan	DEC
(Suriname) Rayen Simson
(Netherlands) Stuart Ballentine
(Japan) Hiromu Yoshitaka	WIN

Semi Finals
(Netherlands) Dylan Gravenberg
(United States) Ron Belliveau	WIN
(Thailand) Bovi Chorwaikan
(Japan) Hiromu Yoshitaka	WIN

Final
(United States) Ron Belliveau
(Japan) Hiromu Yoshitaka	WIN

== Results ==
Shoot Boxing World Tournament 1997 Results
S-Cup '95 Quarter Finals: Shoot Boxing Rules / 3Min. 3R Ext.2R
(Netherlands) Dylan Gravenberg def. Makoto Ohe (Japan)
Gravenberg defeated Ohe.
(United States) Ron Belliveau def. Takashi Abe (boxing) (Japan)
Belliveau defeated Abe.
(Thailand) Bovi Chorwaikan def. Rayen Simson (Suriname)
Chorwaikan defeated Simson by 2nd Extra Round Decision.
(Japan) Hiromu Yoshitaka def. Stuart Ballentine (Netherlands)
Yoshitaka defeated Ballentine.
S-Cup '95 Semi Finals: Shoot Boxing Rules / 3Min. 3R Ext.2R
(United States) Ron Belliveau def. Dylan Gravenberg (Netherlands)
Bm defeated Gravenberg.
(Japan) Hiromu Yoshitaka def. Bovi Chorwaikan (Thailand)
Yoshitaka defeated Chorwaikan.
S-Cup '95 Final: Shoot Boxing Rules / 3Min. 3R Ext.2R
(Japan) Hiromu Yoshitaka def. Ron Belliveau (United States)
Yoshitaka defeated Belliveau

== See also ==
- List of male kickboxers
