= Shoot Boxing – S-Cup 1996 =

Shoot Boxing - S-Cup 1996
- Promotion: Shoot Boxing
- Date: July 14, 1996
- Venue: Yoyogi National Gymnasium
- City: Tokyo, Japan

Event chronology
Shoot Boxing World Tournament 1995	Shoot Boxing - S-Cup 1996	Shoot Boxing World Tournament 1997

Shoot Boxing – S-Cup 1996 was a shoot boxing event promoted by Caesar Takeshi. It was a qualifier for the Shoot Boxing World Tournament 1997, featuring four elimination fights with all bouts fought under Shoot Boxing Rules (70kg/154lbs weight class) involving eight fighters from across the world. The eight finalists were a mixture of invitees or had been involved in the 1995 tournament (for more information on these finalists, see the bulleted list below).

As well as competition bouts there were also five 'Super Fights', three fought under Shoot Boxing Rules (various weight classes), two fought under MMA Rules, and a 'Special Fight' fought under Kyokushin Karate Rules (75kg/165lbs weight class). In total there were twenty fighters at the event, representing eleven countries.

The four elimination fight winners would qualify for the semi-final stage of the Shoot Boxing World Tournament 1997 - to be held the following year. Defeated elimination fighter Dany Bill would also be invited to take part in a 'Super Fight' against up and coming shoot boxer Kenichi Ogata. The event was held at the Yoyogi National Gymnasium in Tokyo, Japan on Sunday, 14 July 1996.

S-Cup 1997 Finalists

- (France) Dany Bill - Invitee, WMTC World Champion
- (Morocco) Hassan Kassrioui - Invitee
- (Japan) Taro Minato - Invitee, MAJKF Champion
- (Morocco) Mohamed Ouali - WPKL World Champion
- (Thailand) Rainbow Sor.Prantalay - Invitee, WMTC World Champion
- (United States) Roni Lewis - S Cup 95 Runner-up
- (Suriname) Rayen Simson - S Cup 95 Quarter-finalist, WPKL European Champion
- (Japan) Hiromu Yoshitaka - S Cup 95 Champion

== Results ==
Shoot Boxing S Cup 1996 Results

Special Fight -75 kg: Kyokushin Karate Rules / 3Min. 3R
(Australia) Garry O'Neill def. Norihisa Horiike (Japan)
O'Neill defeated Horiike by 3rd round Split Decision 2-1 (29-27, 29-28, 28-29).
Super Fights: MMA Rules / 10Min. 2R
(Germany) Kimo Leopoldo def. Kazushi Sakuraba (Japan)
Leopoldo defeated Sakuraba by Submission (Arm-Triangle Choke) at 4:19 of the 1st round.
(Russia) Mikhail Illoukhine def. Mestre Hulk (Brazil)
Illoukhine defeated Hulk by Submission (Chin in the Eye) at 6:59 of the 1st round.
Super Fight -58 kg: Shoot Boxing Rules / 3Min. 3R Ext.2R
(Japan) Takehiro Murahama def. Charley Jeremie (France)
Murahama defeated Jeremie by TKO (Corner Stoppage) at 3:00 of the 2nd round.
Super Fight -70 kg: Shoot Boxing Rules / 3Min. 3R Ext.2R
(Japan) Kenichi Ogata def. Marcelo Aguiar (Brazil)
Ogata defeated Aguiar by 3rd round Unanimous Decision (29-28.5, 30-29, 30-29).
Super Fight -78 kg: Shoot Boxing Rules / 3Min. 3R Ext.2R
(United States) Manson Gibson draw. Yarsin Loogklongtan (Thailand)
Match resulted in a 2nd Extra Round Decision Draw 1-1 (10-9, 10-10, 9-10).
S-Cup '96 Elimination Fights: Shoot Boxing Rules / 3Min. 3R Ext.2R
(Japan) Hiromu Yoshitaka def. Rainbow Sor.Prantalay (Thailand)
Yoshitaka defeated Sor.Prantalay by 3rd round Majority Decision 2-0 (29-28, 29-29, 30-29).
(Suriname) Rayen Simson def. Roni Lewis (United States)
Simson defeated Lewis by 3rd round Unanimous Decision 3-0 (30-27, 30-26, 30-26).
(Morocco) Hassan Kassrioui def. Dany Bill (France)
Kassrioui defeated Bill by Extra Round Unanimous Decision 3-0 (10-9, 10-9, 10-9).
(Morocco) Mohamed Ouali def. Taro Minato (Japan)
Ouali defeated Minato by KO (Right Hook) at 0:25 of the 2nd round.
