= Owen Swift =

British bare-knuckle prize fighter (1814–1879)

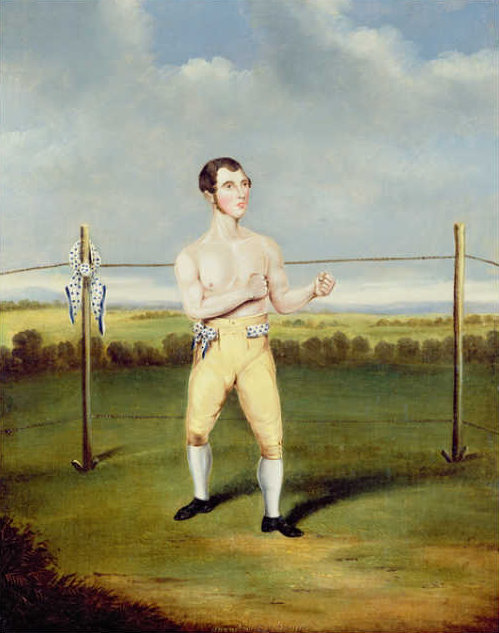
Owen Swift "The Wonder", A. Clark, 19th century. Oil on canvas, private collection.

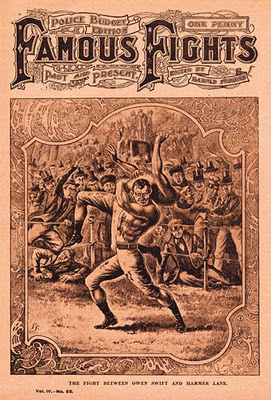
The Fight between Hammer Lane and Owen Swift (1834) as imagined by Famous Fights: Past and Present, No. 52, published circa 1903.

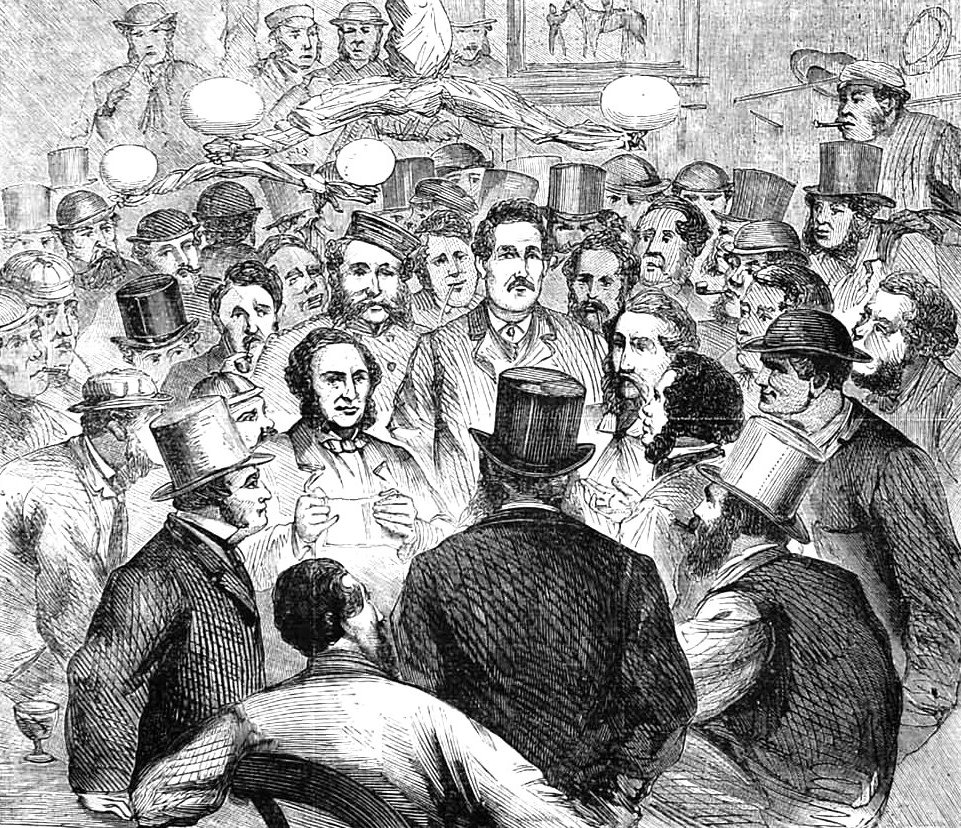
Arranging a fight at Owen Swift's, Illustrated Sporting News and Theatrical and Musical Review, 1863.

Owen Swift (1814 – 9 June 1879) was a British bare-knuckle prize fighter, who killed three men in boxing bouts. The death of "Brighton Bill" in one particularly savage 85-round bout in 1838, and Swift's subsequent conviction for manslaughter, led to the adoption of the London Prize Ring Rules.

== Career ==
His 1 June 1837 fight with Israel "London Izzy" Lazarus (the father of Harry Lazarus) is recounted in detail in Frank Lewis Dowling's 1855 book, Fights for the Championship; and Celebrated Prize Battles; Or Accounts of All the Prize Battles for the Championship &c. Swift was the outsider, and at odds of 6 to 4, bet on himself to win. Swift was much the lighter man, at no more than nine stone (57 kg; 130 lb) in weight, with "not an ounce of superfluous flesh on his ribs". The odds on both fighters changed many times, and each was "within an ace of losing". The fight lasted 113 rounds, two hours and fifteen minutes, and Lazarus was "dreadfully punished", and it was his last ever fight.

After one of his fights in 1838, which lasted 85 rounds and 95 minutes, Swift's opponent, William Phelps, known as "Brighton Bill", died. The fight took place at Melbourne Heath, Essex, in front of a crowd of about 3,000. Phelps — who had already killed a man — became the third man Swift killed. Bets were taken that neither man would survive for long after the fight; Swift was very badly beaten, making his eventual recovery doubtful.

After the coroner's inquest, Swift was tried and found guilty of manslaughter, as were three of the organisers. In 1839, The Annual Register described the fight as "one of the most savage 'pieces of sport' that has disgraced the country for several years".

This event led to the rules of boxing being rewritten. The London Prize Ring Rules were introduced by the Pugilists's Protective Association and replaced Broughton's rules of 1743. There were 29 rules, built on Broughton's rules, but with more depth and detail. These rules more clearly defined the range of fouls and introduced certain safety measures.

Swift's last two fights were both with Jack Adams, on 5 June and 5 September 1838, both in France. Swift won both fights. Afterwards, Swift became a tavern owner, running the Horse Shoe in Tichborne Street (now Glasshouse Street), Soho, London.

In 1840, Swift published The Hand-book to Boxing, which was a defence of the sport, a history of boxing, a guide for spectators, and advice on how to train and fight.

== Death ==
Swift died in 1879. He is buried at Kensal Green Cemetery. In 2025 he was inducted to International Boxing Hall of Fame as a pioneer inductee.

== Homonym ==
Another professional boxer active in 1931–1932, Forest Hall, also used the name Owen Swift.

== Publications ==
- Swift, Owen (1830). The modern English boxer,: Or, Scientific art and practice of attack & self defence explained in an easy manner that any person may comprehend this useful ... descriptions of correct pugilistic attitudes. H. Hewitt. ASIN B0008BDZSK.
- Swift, Owen (1840). The Hand-Book to Boxing; Being a Complete Instructor in the Art of Self-Defence, with a Complete Chronology of the Ring From the Days of Fig and Broughton to November 1840 (PDF). London: Nicholson.
- Swift, Owen (1885). Owen Swift's boxing without a master, or, The art of self defence Owen Swift. New York: Henry J. Wehman. OCLC 54240360.

== See also ==
- Simon Byrne
- Charles Lecour
