= Charles Charlemont =

French boxer (b. 1862, d. 1942)

Charles Charlemont (born Louis Charles Pilet; 21 November 1862, in Paris – 31 May 1942, in Saint-Germain-en-Laye) was a French boxing master and trainer. He is the son of Joseph Charlemont, became one of the greatest savateur.

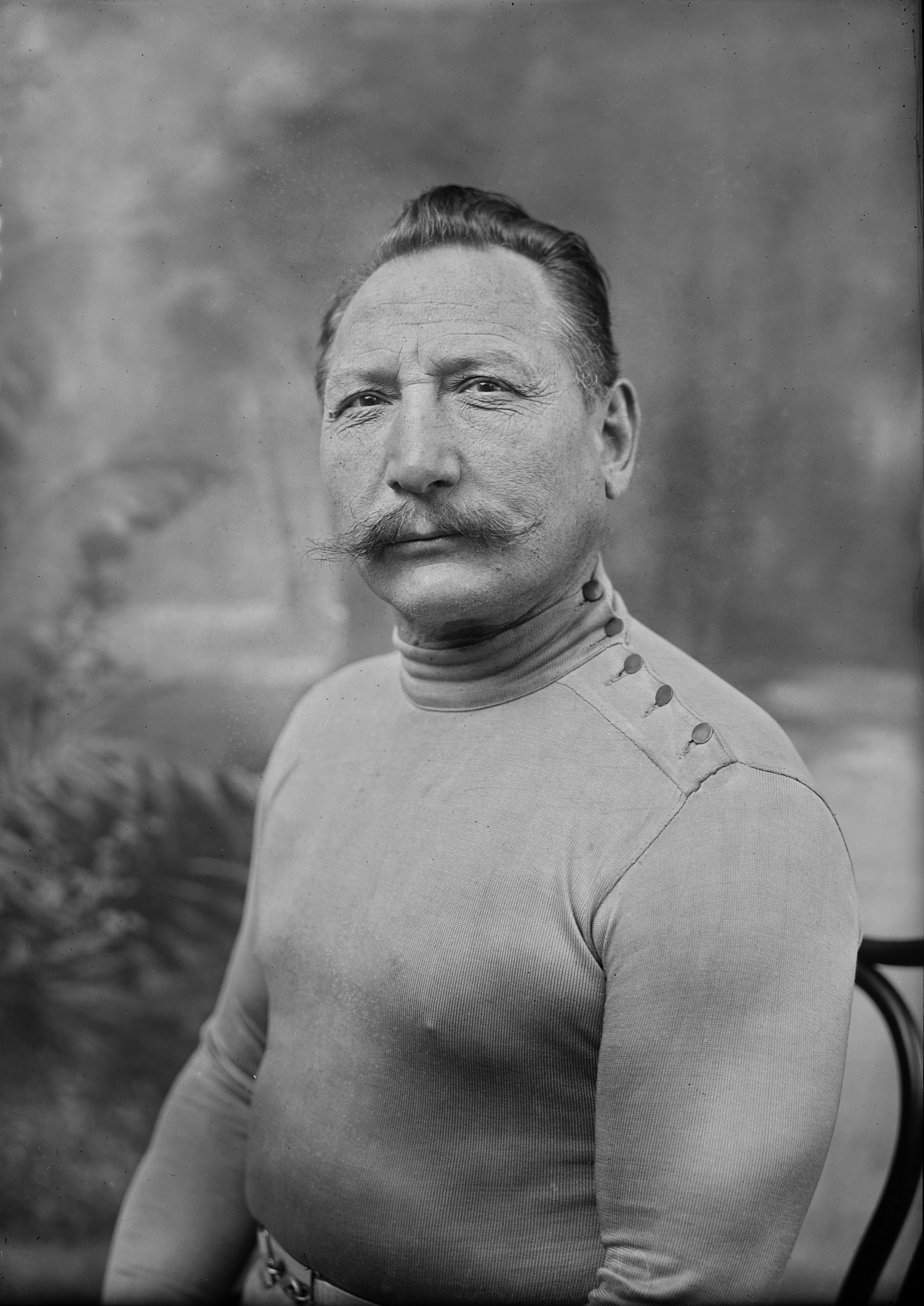

Charles Charlemont defeated the Joe Driscoll in the Fight of the Century in 1899. Following this match, savate was exported to the United States and the United Kingdom where it was taught to the armed forces as Automatic Defense. One of Charlemont's senior students was Comte Pierre Baruzy
