= Joseph Charlemont =

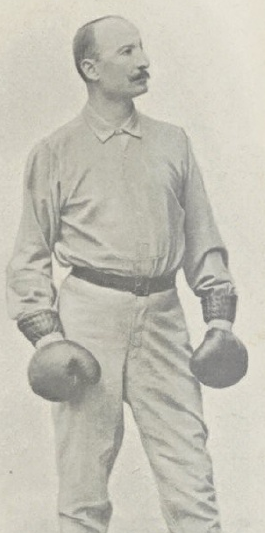
- Born: 1839; Lesdain, France
- Died: 1918 (aged 78–79)
- Occupation: Instructor
- Known for: Savate
- Children: Charles Charlemont

Joseph Charlemont (born 1839 in Lesdain, France - died 1918) was a French savate and Canne de combat teacher. His son Charles Charlemont (1862 - 1944) was also a noted savateur.

== Life ==
Although Charlemont has often been described as a student of Charles Lecour, he was instructed by Louis Vigneron. After he had fought Hubert Lecour (who was Charles Lecour's brother and a savate instructor himself), Joseph was considered one of the best competitors within French boxing. He gained recognition by taking on representatives of other schools and different styles. His fighting style and own teachings and developments were built on the modern version of savate as promoted by Charles Lecour. His detailed update of Lecour's French Boxing established Charlemont's reputation. He described his system in two books, where he described a system built around four ranges of combat (i. e. striking distances,) where striking and grappling were to be used in conjunction with one another.

== Legacy ==
His books established a new standard where system forms the technical syllabus which modern sport of savate is based on. Moreover, he founded an association for French boxing, the Society of French Boxers (Société des Boxeurs Français).

== Selected publications ==
- L'Art de la Boxe Française Et de la Canne: Nouveau Traité Pratique Et Théorique (1899)
