= Mestre (title) =

In the Brazilian martial art capoeira, the title mestre designates the master practitioner. Manuel dos Reis Machado, also known as Mestre Bimba, is credited with transforming capoeira from a street activity to a sport.

== Notable capoeira mestres ==
- Mestre Acordeon
- Mestre Bimba
- Mestre Braga
- Mestre Canjiquinha
- Mestre Cobra Mansa
- Mestre Cobrinha Verde
- Mestre Gato Preto
- Mestre João Grande
- Mestre João Pequeno
- Mestre Moraes
- Mestre Pastinha
- Mestre Sinhozinho
- Mestre Waldemar
- Mestre Zuma
- Mestre Leopoldina
- Mestre Curió

== Sources ==
- Assunção, Matthias Röhrig (2005) [2002]. Capoeira: The History of an Afro-Brazilian Martial Art. Routledge. ISBN 978-0-7146-8086-6.
