= Mestre Waldemar =

Brazilian capoeira master

Waldemar Rodrigues da Paixão
- Mestre Waldemar, Liberdade, 1953, by Alice Brill
- Born: February 22, 1916; Salvador, Bahia
- Died: 1990
- Other name: Mestre Waldemar
- Known for: Capoeira mestre

Waldemar Rodrigues da Paixão (February 22, 1916 – 1990), known as Mestre Waldemar (Valdemar, Waldemar da Liberdade, Waldemar do Pero Vaz), was a Brazilian capoeira mestre and musician from the state of Bahia. He is considered one of the most artistic and skillful capoeira Angola players of his time.

Waldemar lived in the Corta-Braço slum, a poor neighborhood in Salvador, later known as Liberdade. He held capoeira rodas in his backyard shed (barracão) every Sunday. He kept his rodas open to all capoeiristas, regardless of their style. Mestre Waldemar's roda became one of the most important meeting points for Bahian capoeiristas.

== Biography ==
Waldemar Rodrigues da Paixão was born in 1916 on Ilha de Maré. He started learning capoeira in 1936 at the age of 20. His learned from teachers such as Canário Pardo, Peripiri, Talabi, Siri-de-Mangue, and Ricardo of Ilha de Maré.

=== Barracão of Mestre Waldemar ===
I always wanted to stay out of brawls, out of trouble. Everyone appreciates me, everyone likes me. If you go here and there, you won’t find anyone who speaks badly of me, in any subject. I know how to treat everyone well, I don’t mistreat anyone.

In the 1940s, Waldemar established a practice venue in the Corta-Braço, which would later become the Liberdade neighborhood of Salvador. He held capoeira sessions there every Sunday and also taught in the lower city. His practice encompassed a variety of capoeira styles, ranging from the slower to the more combative. In Waldemar's roda, there was a referee with a whistle to control the games. Capoeiristas often arrived at the roda armed, but their respect for Mestre Waldemar showed as they handed over their weapons to the bartender while they engaged in the game.

When there was a disobedient student, I got the rest of the group together and told them to beat him up, lightly.

In that time, Mestre Bimba created a new capoeira Regional style, and made attempts to persuade other capoeira mestres to embrace his innovations. He went as far as organizing a gathering that included renowned angoleiros like Pastinha and Waldemar. However, they politely declined his proposal, choosing to remain loyal to traditional capoeira.

During the 1950s, his capoeira in Liberdade attracted academics, artists, and journalists. Ethnologists like Anthony Leeds in 1950 and Simone Dreyfus in 1955 recorded the sounds of the berimbaus. Sculptor Mário Cravo and painter Carybé, who were also capoeiristas, frequented his training space. Later on, the majority of renowned capoeiristas claimed that Waldemar had a significant influence on their own capoeira, including Mestre Cobrinha Verde from the Nordeste de Amaralina neighborhood and Mestre Bimba.

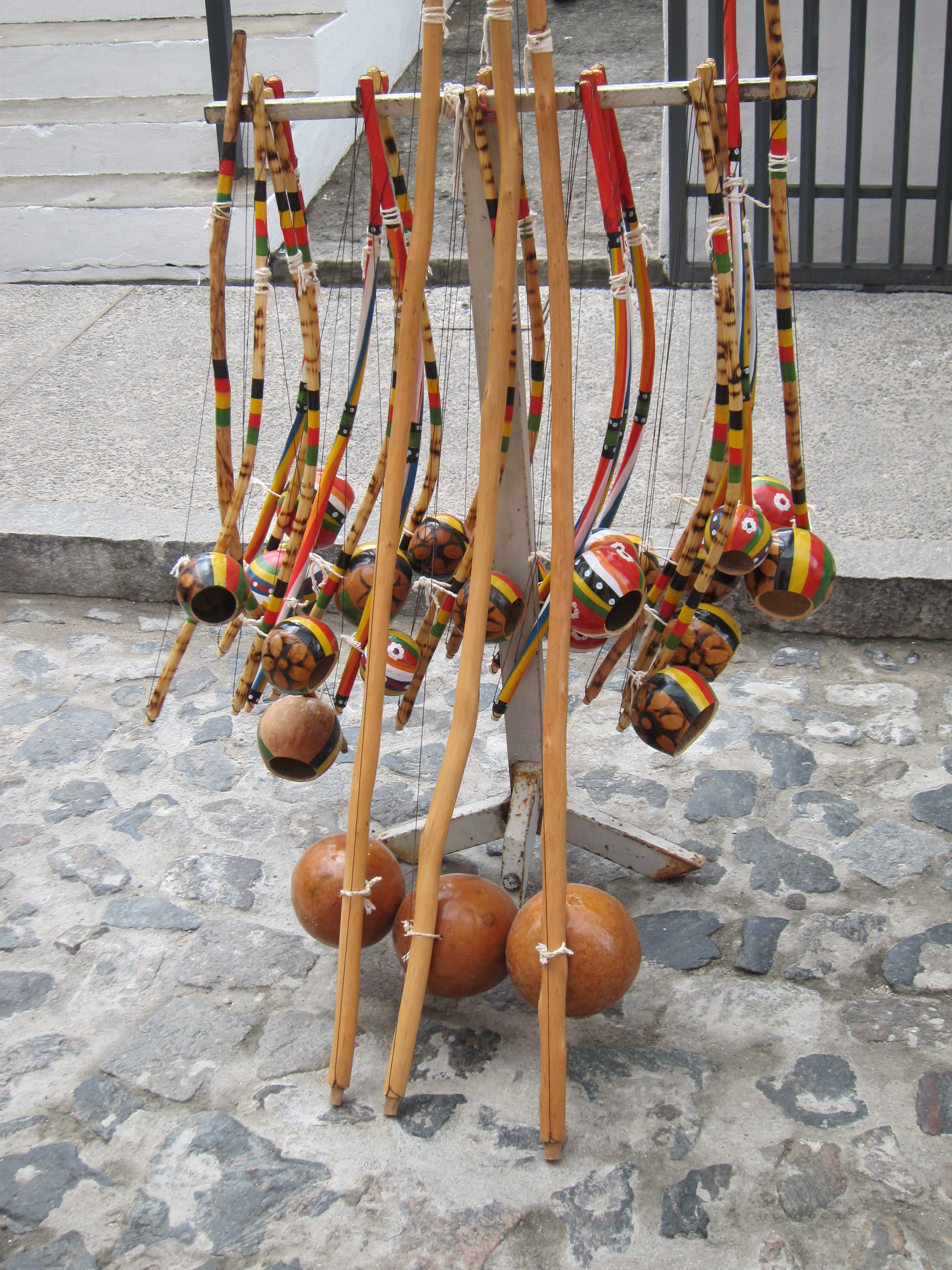
Waldemar started the practice of painting the berimbau. Crafting and selling berimbaus to tourists became a source of his income.

According to Albano Marinho de Oliveira (1956), the Liberdade group began singing long solos before capoeira games (now called ladainhas). Waldemar himself claimed, in an interview with Kay Shaffer, to have been the one to introduce the practice of painting the berimbau. Crafting and selling berimbaus to tourists became a source of his income.

=== Illness and death ===
Despite growing old and being unable to play capoeira or play the berimbau due to Parkinson's, Waldemar still participated somewhat in the movement to revive traditions in the 1980s. He sang on various occasions and recorded an album with Mestre Canjiquinha in 1984.

Mestre Waldemar died in 1990 and is remembered as one of the greatest mestres of capoeira.

=== Waldemar's capoeira ===
Mestre Waldemar has its secret mortal blow called Dentinho de Angola (little tooth of Angola):

The Dentinho de Angola can kill, yes ma’am. The movement involves curving the body and lifting the heel of your shoe to the opponent’s Adam’s apple. It’s my pulo de gato. [cat’s leap, an expression referring to a professional secret, a trick of the trade]

His learning method did not involve repetitive sequences:

I taught in the roda, but there were also training days. They would play and I would make a signal to do tesoura, I would make a signal to do chibata. I would make a signal for the other player to duck.

== Recordings ==
Music:

- Leeds, Anthony, Sound recordings of Afro-Bahians, collected by A. Leeds, 1951–52. Archive of Traditional Music, Indiana University. Audio recordings and brief notes.
- Dreyfus, Simone, Bahia, Brazil capoeira, October 31, 1955. Paris, CNRS/Musée de l'Homme. Edited in the LP Brésil n.2 Bahia, Paris: Musée de L'Homme MH16, 1956.
- Paixão, Waldemar da, & Silva, Washington Bruno da, Mestre Waldemar e Mestre Canjiquinha, record; 1986.

Videos:

- Robatto Filho, Alexandre, Vadiação, film, 1954.
- Queiroz, Mércia; Ottoni, Ricardo, Em cena: Capoeira, IRDEB, 1986. Video.
- Chagas, Raimundo & Silva, Wanda, Berimbau, Salvador:IRDEB, 1989; O Som dos Instrumentos program; video.

== Heritage ==
In Bahia, there is a neighborhood and a street named after him.

== Literature ==
- Carybé, Hector Barnabó Paribe, a.k.a., Jogo da capoeira, Salvador: Livraria Turista, 1951; Col. Recôncavo, nº3, p. 8.
- Abreu, Frederico, O Barracão de mestre Waldemar, Salvador: Zarabatana, 2003.
- Rego, Waldeloir, Capoeira Angola, ensaio socio-ethnográfico, Salvador: Itapoã, 1968, pp. 61, 279;
- Shaffer, Kay, O Berimbau-de-barriga e seus toques, Rio de Janeiro: MEC, 1977 Monografias folclóricas 2, pp. 21–22, 26–27, 29, 35–37, 41, 47–48, 50, 52, 55.
- Tavares, Odorico, Bahia Imagens da Terra e do Povo, illustrated by Carybé (Heitor Barnabo Paribe); Rio de Janeiro: Civilização Brasileira, 3rd ed. 1961 4th ed. 1964, pp. 177–178;
- Assunção, Matthias Röhrig (2002). Capoeira: The History of an Afro-Brazilian Martial Art. Routledge. ISBN 978-0-7146-8086-6.
- Varela, Sergio González (2017). Power in Practice: The Pragmatic Anthropology of Afro-Brazilian Capoeira. Berghahn Books. ISBN 9781785336355.

== See also ==
- Mestre Pastinha
- Capoeira Angola
