= Camafeu de Oxóssi =

- Born: October 4, 1915; Salvador
- Died: April 10, 1994 (aged 78); Salvador
- Other name: Ápio da Conceição
- Occupations: Musician, capoeira mestre
- Known for: Cuisine, capoeira, music
- Parents: Faustino José do Patrocínio (father); Maria Firmina da Conceição (mother)

Ápio Patrocínio da Conceição, known as Camafeu de Oxóssi (Salvador, October 4, 1915 – March 26, 1994), was a capoeira mestre, president of the Filhos de Gandhi, Obá de Xangô in candomblé, owner of the famous restaurant in the Mercado Modelo (which still bears his name today), musician, composer, and an iconic figure in the capital of Bahia, mentioned in books and songs.

== Biography ==
He was born on October 4, 1915, in Nazaré neighborhood of Salvador, Bahia. Camafeu was the son of Faustino José do Patrocínio and Maria Firmina da Conceição. His father died when he was young, and his mother was a baiana do acarajé (a traditional Bahian street food vendor). He spent his childhood on the streets of Pelourinho, working as a shoe shiner, newspaper seller, and lace seller.

He studied at the School of Apprentice Artisans and worked in a foundry. He worked as a stevedore before becoming a merchant in the Mercado Modelo. In 1945, he acquired his first stall there. He owned the "Barraca São Jorge," where he sold items related to candomblé and berimbaus. He was well-versed in capoeira and was a skilled berimbau player, composing various songs, chulas, and sambas.

When the Ilê Axé Opô Afonjá was led by Mãe Senhora, he received the title of Obá de Xangô, along with other cultural luminaries like Carybé, Dorival Caymmi, and Gilberto Gil.

In 1961, he was one of the first students in the Yoruba language course at the Federal University of Bahia. In 1966, mestre Pastinha participated with the Brazilian delegation of the "First International Festival de Artes Negras" in Dakar, Senegal, bringing with him João Grande, Gato Preto, Gildo Alfinete, Roberto Satanás and Camafeu de Oxossi.

Camafeu de Oxóssi released his first record in 1967. In 1972, he opened the "Camafeu de Oxóssi" restaurant in the Mercado Modelo, together with his wife Toninha. The restaurant became a landmark for Bahian cuisine.

He served as the president of the Filhos de Gandhi group, which was founded by stevedores like him in 1949, the year of the death of Indian leader Mahatma Gandhi. The institution faced a crisis from 1973 to 1976, during which it did not parade in the Carnival of Salvador. Under Camafeu's leadership, which lasted until 1982, the Afoxé group was able to recover and grow again.

Camafeu succumbed to cancer and died in 1994. His funeral was attended by a large crowd, as well as prominent figures from politics and culture. He was buried in the Cemetery of the Third Order of São Franscisco.

== Discography ==
- Berimbaus da Bahia – by Camafeu de Oxóssi 1967, Continental, with a text on the back cover by Jorge Amado.
- Camafeu de Oxóssi, 1968, Philips (LP)

== Literature ==
- Assunção, Matthias Röhrig (2002). Capoeira: The History of an Afro-Brazilian Martial Art. Routledge. ISBN 978-0-7146-8086-6.
