= Vicente Ferreira Pastinha =

Brazilian martial artist (1889–1981)

- Mestre Pastinha playing the berimbau. Photo by Pierre Verger, 1946–1947.
- Born: April 5, 1889; Salvador, Bahia, Brazil
- Died: November 13, 1981 (aged 92)
- Other name: "110"
- Education: Na Escola de Aprendiz Marinheiro da Bahia (Navy); Liceu de Artes e Ofício school Centro Esportivo de Capoeira Angola (CECA)
- Occupations: shoeshiner, tailor, gold prospector, security guard
- Known for: Mestre Capoeira

Vicente Ferreira Pastinha (April 5, 1889, Salvador, Bahia, Brazil – November 13, 1981), known as Mestre Pastinha, was a mestre of the Afro-Brazilian martial art capoeira and a codifier of the traditional capoeira Angola style.

Mestre Pastinha was a capoeirista whose game was characterized by agility, quickness and intelligence. He demonstrated that even in his seventies, he could engage in acrobatics and outperform much younger capoeiristas.

He choose not to introduce new kicks in order to preserve the original art. He wanted his students to improve the principal techniques (ginga, cotovelada, joelhada, negativa, cabeçada, rasteira, rabo de arraia, chapa de costa, chapa empurrando, meia lua, meia lua de costa, cutilada de mão/hand strikes, corta capim, tesoura, and aú with rolê), that allow a proper jogo de dentro (inner game) or ''jogo de fora'' (outside game) to develop.

Pastinha was known as the "philosopher of capoeira" because of his use of many aphorisms. He made it his mission to clearly separate capoeira Angola from violence.

Two of Pastinha's principal disciples were mestres João Pequeno and João Grande.

== Life ==
Pastinha was born on April 5, 1889, in Salvador. Little is documented about his family background, except that his mother, Maria Eugenia Ferreira, was a woman from Bahia, and his father, José Pastiña, was a Spanish peddler.

Pastinha's introduction to capoeira arose from a need for self-defense. As a ten-year-old, he faced bullying from a larger boy in his neighborhood Rua da Laranjeira. Witnessing his predicament, an elderly African neighbor named Benedito, native of Angola, offered to teach him capoeira. After several months of training with him, Pastinha beat the bully.

He continued his training with Benedito for two more years. Pastinha's teacher did not use a berimbau, but only a drum, which seems to be common in Bahian capoeira at that time.

=== Navy School ===
At the age of 12, Pastinha began his apprenticeship at the Navy School in Salvador.

During his time in the Navy, Pastinha received instruction in fencing, jack-knife techniques, and Swedish gymnastics. His musical talents also flourished under the guidance of the renowned musician Anacleto Vidal da Cunha. It is likely that he played, perhaps the horn, in the Navy orchestra. Pastinha's own accounts suggest that he even shared his knowledge of capoeira with some of his fellow sailors.

He left the Navy at the age of 20 in 1910.

=== Capoeira instructor ===
Capoeira is for men, women and children.

— Mestre Pastinha

Pastinha made a living through various jobs, including shoe cleaning, newspaper sales, carpentry, and working as a casino bouncer. According to his interview, Pastinha wanted to live through the sale of his oil paintings, though this endeavor did not entirely materialize.

He established his first capoeira school in a bicycle workshop located on the Campo da Pólvora. After 1910, he began teaching capoeira to artisans and students residing in shared accommodations (repúblicas) in the surrounding neighborhood, although scant details are available about his early students.

In street rodas, Pastinha was always ready for any unforeseen circumstances. He frequently recalled that he carried a small sickle that could be affixed to the berimbau, effectively turning the instrument into a formidable weapon should a street fight arise. However, despite his initial acclaim, Pastinha completely withdrew from the practice of capoeira in the following years. According to his own writings, he withdrew from 1912 until 1941.

=== Capoeira Angola center ===
Centro Esportivo de Capoeira Angola
- colors
- Also known as: CECA
- Date founded: 1941
- Country of origin: Brazil
- Founder: Vicente Pastinha
- Arts taught: capoeira Angola
- Ancestor arts: engolo
- Ancestor schools: Centro de Capoeira Angola
- Practitioners: João Pequeno; João Grande

Well, there is one thing that nobody doubts: the ones to teach capoeira to us were the negro slaves that were brought from Angola.

— Mestre Pastinha

During the 1930s, traditional Bahian capoeira became known as capoeira de Angola, opposing Bimba's capoeira Regional. A group of old mestres held regular rodas in Gengibirra area, in black neighbourhood Liberdade, to preserve traditional style. Rodas was led by Mestre Amorzinho, a civil guard who offered protection from police harassment. According to Mestre Noronha, it was the first center for Capoeira Angola, founded by 22 mestres.

According to Pastinha's account, one of his top students, Aberrê, visited Gengibirra and impressed the mestres there with skills, so they ask him for teacher. Pastinha eventually visited them on 23 February 1941:

To my surprise, Mr. Amorzinho, the owner of that capoeira, extended his hand to me and remarked, "I've wanted to pass on this capoeira for you to teach for quite some time." I attempted to decline with an apology, but Mr. Antonio Maré intervened, asserting, "There's no escaping it, Pastinha, you are the one who will be in charge of this."

In his memoirs, Noronha offered a slightly different version of the episode, suggesting that it was only after Amorzinho's death that the other mestres decided to pass the leadership to Pastinha. However, in 1941 Pastinha founded the Centro Esportivo de Capoeira Angola, located at the Pelourinho.

Like Bimba, Pastinha formalized capoeira practice by establishing structured classes within a dedicated "academy". Students were required to wear uniforms during both training sessions and exhibitions. The uniform designs evolved over time, drawing clear inspiration from sports jerseys. From about 1950, Pastinha adopted the colors of his favorite soccer club, Ypiranga, yellow and black, which became the hallmarks of the Angola style he taught. His goal of imparting knowledge to the 'next generation' of mestres also led to the establishment of hierarchical structures within capoeira.

I practice the true capoeira Angola and in my school they learn to be sincere and just. That is the Angola law. I inherited it from my grandfather. It is the law of loyalty. The capoeira Angola that I learned - I did not change it here in my school… When my students go on they go on to know about everything. They know; this is fight, this is cunning. We must be calm. It is not an offensive fight. capoeira waits (…). The good capoeirista must know how to sing, play capoeira and the instruments of capoeira.

Pastinha participated with the Brazilian delegation of the "First International Festival de Artes Negras" in Dakar, Senegal (1966), bringing with him João Grande, Gato Preto, Gildo Alfinete, Roberto Satanás and Camafeu de Oxossi.

=== Twilight years ===
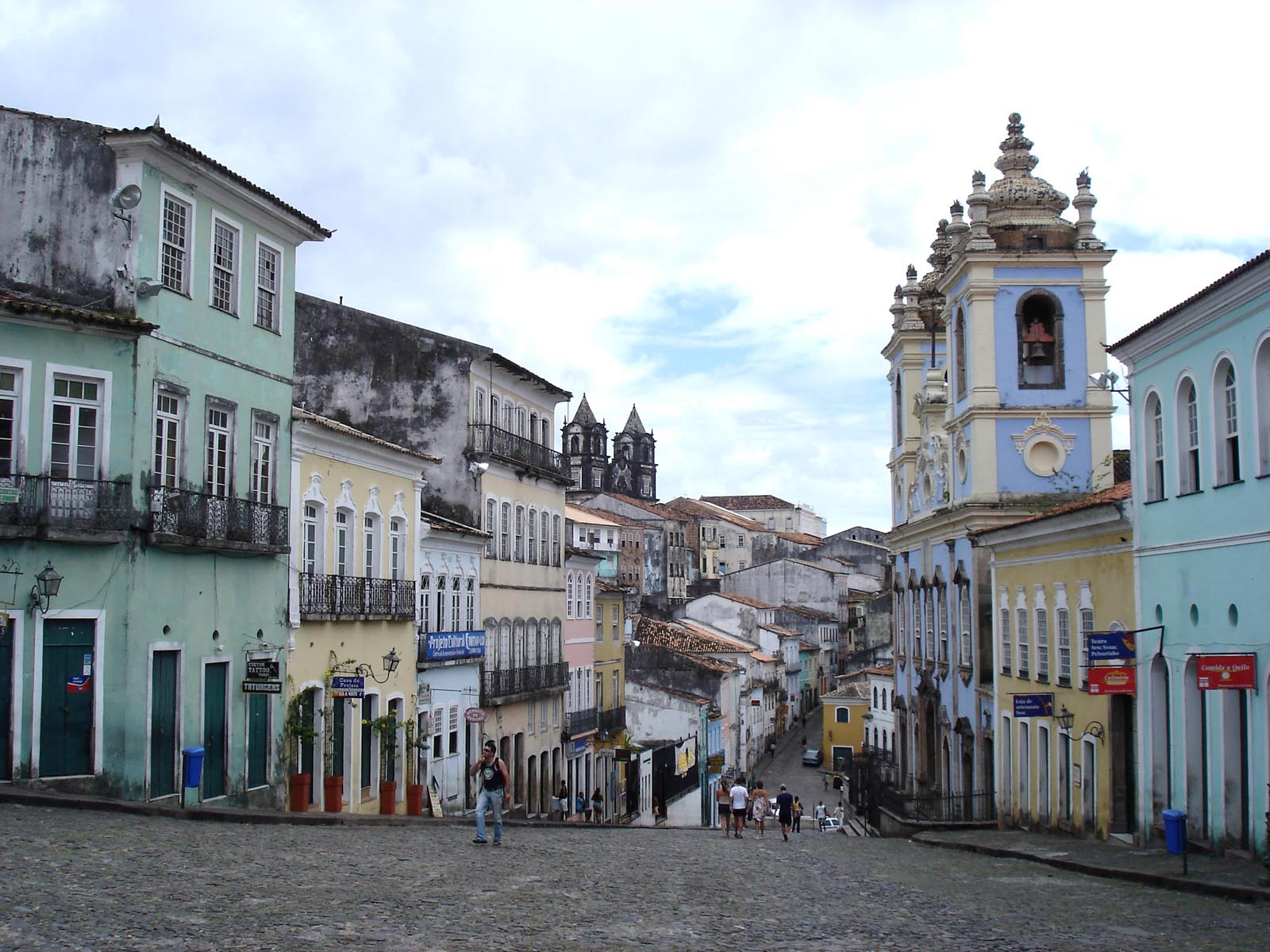
Pelourinho, a historic neighborhood in Salvador, Bahia

Pastinha worked as shoeshiner, tailor, gold prospector, security guard at a gambling house and construction worker at the Porto de Salvador to support himself financially so that he could do what he loved the most, to be an Angoleiro.

Eventually Pastinha's academy fell on hard times. Pastinha, old, sick and almost totally blind, was asked by the government to vacate his academy for renovations, but the space was never returned to him. Instead it became a restaurant and entertainment outlet. Pastinha was left abandoned in a city shelter (abrigo D. Pedro II - Salvador).

Pastinha played his last game of capoeira on April 12, 1981. He died at the age of 92 on November 13, 1981.

Two of his most learned students, João Grande and João Pequeno, continued to share capoeira Angola with the world.

== On capoeira ==
Pastinha believed, good mestre should watch the game not to become violent and not to lose rhythm:

When in the past it was violent, many mestres, and others, drew our attention when out of rhythm. They explained decently and gave us the education within the sport of capoeira. This is the reason all those who come from the past possess body game and have rhythm.

For him, capoeira Angola is not a fight for victory over an "opponent". Pastinha appealed to participants "not to aspire to fight our comrades (companions)". Capoeiristas should play:

Without ambitions, without ill will, without disappointments, without pushing to the front to play before your turn.

Pastinha stressed that a good capoeirista should always remain calm and decent:

The good capoeirista never gets exalted, always tries to remain calm to be able to reflect with precision and rightness. He does not quarrel with his comrades or pupils, he does not play without it being his turn, in order not to anger his companions and create squabbles.

He emphasized, in particular, the role of capoeira music and singing:

Capoeira is only beautiful when playing and singing and only loses its beauty when people don’t sing. It is the duty of all capoeiristas. It is not a failing not to know how to sing, but it is a failing not to know how to reply, at least to the chorus.

For Pastinha, capoeira Angola is more than a simple sport but a philosophy and a sacred legacy he ardently aimed to protect. His insistence on loving capoeira Angola mirrored a deep devotion akin to religious faith. As his friend, sculptor Mário Cravo, noted, "Pastinha was a mystic because he lived capoeira with intensity and made his own interpretation of the mystic universe."

== Lineage ==
In Capoeira Angola, lineage represents the chain of teachers (mestres) and students that define one's role in the community and shape a school's teachings. Styles evolve uniquely through various teachers who pass them on to their students. Pastinha's school in Pelourinho was influential in shaping Capoeira Angola. Many mestres in this tradition trace their lineage back to him.

Pastinha
João Pequeno	Gildo Alfinete	João Grande	Boca Rica	Aberrê	Curió	Pessoa Bababá
Barba Branca	Jogo de Dentro	Pé de Chumbo	Moraes	Canjiquinha	Bola Sete
Cobra Mansa	Jurandir	Braga	Neco	Lua
Valmir	Silvinho

== Literature ==
- Assunção, Matthias Röhrig (2002). Capoeira: The History of an Afro-Brazilian Martial Art. Routledge. ISBN 978-0-7146-8086-6.
- Capoeira, Nestor (2007). The Little Capoeira Book. Blue Snake Books. ISBN 9781583941980.

== See also ==
- Capoeira Angola
- Mestre Bimba
- Mestre Waldemar
- João Grande
- João Pequeno
