= Capoeira music =

Musical accompaniment to the Brazilian martial art

Coordinates: 17°37′55″S 41°44′16″W

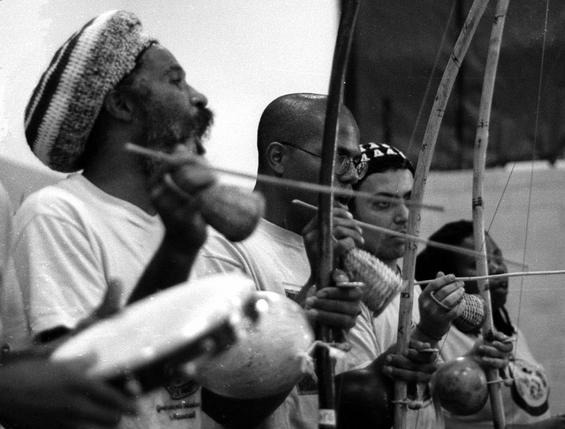
- A capoeira bateria led by Mestre Cobra Mansa featuring three berimbaus and a pandeiro.
- Other names: Música de Capoeira
- Stylistic origins: African music; Samba; Candomblé; Batuque
- Cultural origins: Brazil
- Typical instruments: berimbau; pandeiro; atabaque; agogô; reco-reco

Capoeira music is the traditional musical accompaniment used in Afro-Brazilian art capoeira, featuring instruments like berimbau, pandeiro, atabaque, agogô, and reco-reco. The music plays a crucial role in capoeira roda, setting the style the energy of a game.

Music in the context of capoeira is used to create a sacred space through both the physical act of forming a circle (roda) and an aural space that is believed to connect to the spirit world. This deeper religious significance exists more as a social memory to most capoeira groups, but is generally understood as evidenced in the use of ngoma drums (the atabaques of candomblé), and the berimbau whose earlier forms were used in African rituals to speak with the ancestors.

== History ==
In early days, capoeira was accompanied only by the big drum (known as ngoma, conga or atabaque), hand-clapping and singing. Until the mid-nineteenth century, drums were a prominent musical instrument in capoeira. In the early to mid-nineteenth century Rio, capoeira was described by travelers as a war dance with drumbeats or hand clapping. In 1818, João Angola was arrested for possessing a small drum at a capoeira gathering. Playing a drum could lead to severe punishment, like on 5 December 1820, when Mathias Benguela, a slave, received 200 lashes for it. Despite punishment, drumming continued. An illustration from 1824 by Rugendas shows a participant in roda playing a drum.

In 1833, the playing of African drums in Rio de Janeiro was prohibited by law. Due to the drum's size, it couldn't be concealed, leading to clandestine drumming in remote locations at night. To evade arrest, slaves used makeshift percussion instruments like clay or metal pieces, shells, and stones.

In 1859, French journalist Charles Ribeyrolls described the Afro-Brazilian dances on plantations in Rio de Janeiro province, linking the conga drum to capoeira, and the berimbau to batuque:

Here, Capoeira is a type of war dance, accompanied by the powerful, militant rhythm of the Congo drum. Then there is the Batuque with its sensual movements, with the Urucungo intensifying or slowing down the rhythm.

Gerhard Kubik, a 20th century music ethnologist, saw capoeira as a discipline where the drum not only accompanies but also guides and controls the players' actions. The berimbau belongs to the candomblé tradition. It was not used in capoeira until the 20th century, and first appeared as an instrument accompanying capoeira in the early 20th century in Bahia. The transition may have been influenced not only by musical preferences but also by the berimbau's dual role as a weapon.

Mestre Pastinha formalized the inclusion of instruments into the capoeira Angola orchestra. He experimented with various instruments, occasionally incorporating guitars (viola de corda) and even introducing Spanish castanets into the roda at one point. The current standardized configuration of three berimbaus, two pandeiros, one agogô, one reco-reco, and one atabaque likely did not become established until the 1960s.

== Instruments ==
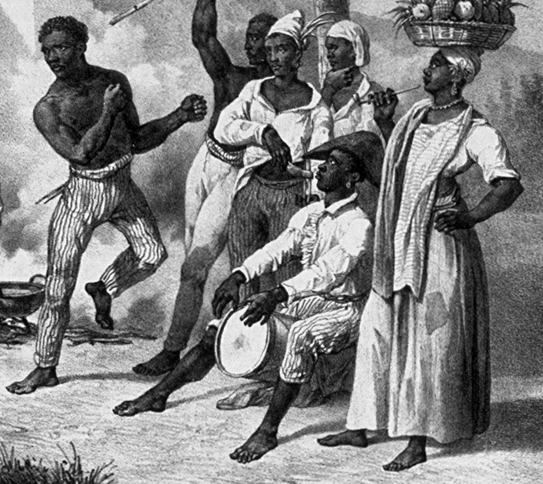
Playing capoeira to the sound of ngoma drum, c. 1823.

The berimbau, pandeiro, atabaque and chanting open a door to a large creative universe: music.

— Mestre Nestor Capoeira

The standard instruments in nowadays capoeira are:

- up to 3 berimbaus
- up to 2 pandeiros
- 1 agogô
- 1 reco-reco (notched wooden tube similar to a guiro)
- 1 atabaque or conga

Not every roda will contain all these instruments. Mestre Bimba, for instance, preferred only one berimbau and two pandeiros in his rodas, but there will always be at least one berimbau in any roda.

The berimbaus preside over the roda, their rhythmic combinations suggesting variations in movement style between the two players in the roda. Some capoeira groups insist that among the three berimbaus, the lowest-toned (called a gunga or berraboi) is the lead instrument, while other groups follow the lead of the middle (medio or viola) berimbau. The roda begins and ends at the discretion of the lead berimbau player, who may determine who plays next, can stop games, set the tempo of the music, and calm the players if they get too rough. There appears to be agreement that the treble-most berimbau (viola or violinha) is an accompaniment instrument, freely improvising based on rhythms of the middle instrument.

== Songs in capoeira ==
In its traditional setting, there are three main styles of song that weave together the structure of the capoeira roda.

Understanding songs in capoeira is a good way to grasp and put into some historical context early Brazilian life and history. If one can identify with the music on a personal level, it goes a long way in adopting the heritage vital in the maintenance of capoeira as a cultural force. The songs of capoeira partly play the role of cultural guide and teacher.

The songs, whether ladainha, corrido, or quadra, can be placed in many categories for comparison. The following list is not exhaustive

What	Examples	Song examples
Folk lessons		
Acknowledging folkway		the corridos Bate Dendê, Marinheiro Sou
Acknowledging Slavery		the corridos Návio Negreiro, a Manteiga Derramou, the interjections iaia and ioio (daughter and son of the slave master respectively)
Acknowledging symbolic aspects of capoeira	vadiação, mandinga/mandingueiro, malandro/malandragem	
Acknowledging roots through place	Angola, Aruanda, Bahia, Pelourinho, Maranhão, Recife	
Acknowledging Religion/Spirituality/Religious Syncretism	references to Catholic saints, God(s), orixás, Candomblé, Nganga, etc...	
Biographical, Autobiographical, Mythological	references to Mestre Bimba, Mestre Pastinha, Mestre Waldemar, Besouro Mangangá, Zumbi	
Songs that comment on the game metaphorically		the corridos a Bananeira Caiu, a Onça Morreu
Songs that comment on the game directly		the corridos Devagar, Donalice Não Me Pegue Não
Greeting and Farewell songs (Despedidas)		the corridos Camungerê, Boa Viagem
Songs that welcome women into the roda to play		the corridos Dona Maria do Camboatá, Sai, Sai, Catarina, and the song Quem foi te disse Capoeira é só pra homem
Meta-Capoeira songs, that is, those that directly reference/invoke Capoeira by name		

Many songs can be considered cross categorizational, as well.

=== Ladainha ===
The roda commences with the ladainha (litany), a solo often sung by the most senior member present, usually the one playing lead berimbau. These songs may be improvised on the spot, but are most often chosen from a canon of extant ladainhas. The ladainha varies in from as little as two lines, to 20 or more. Topics for this song type include moral lessons, stories, history, mythology, can be topical for a particular occasion as well as pure poetry, and almost always metaphorical. The song is loosely strophic and the melody is pretty much the same throughout the entire ladainha repertoire, with some variations here and there. The ladainha uses quatrain form as a template, with the first line almost always repeated.

Portuguese

Iê...ê
Eu já vivo enjoado
Eu já vivo enjoado
de viver aqui na terra
amanhã eu vou pra lua
falei com minha mulher
ela então me respondeu
que nos vamos se deus quiser
Vamos fazer um ranchinho
todo feito de sapé
amanhã as sete horas
nos vamos tomar café
e o que eu nunca acreditei,
o que não posso me conformar
que a lua vem à terra
e a terra vem à lua
todo isso é conversa
pra comer sem trabalhar
o senhor, amigo meu, colega velho
escute bem ao meu cantar
quem é dono não ciuma
e quem não é vai ciumar
camaradinho

English translation

Ieeeee
I am sick
I am sick
of living here on Earth
Tomorrow I'll go to the Moon
I said to my wife
And she responded
Then we'll go, God willing
We'll have a little ranch
All made of straw
Tomorrow morning at seven
We'll have some coffee
What I never believed
Nor could I ever confirm
The moon would come to Earth
And the Earth to the Moon
This is just talk
to eat without working
Sir, good friend, old colleague
Listen well to my song
He who is the master of his land doesn't envy
And he who isn't certainly will
Camaradinho

An interpretation of this song could be: Nothing comes easy without hard work. The person who sings the ladainha cries out "Ieeeeeeee" (pronounced YaaaaaaaaY) to call to order the attendees of the roda, that the roda is starting. The ladainha ends with "Camará", "Camaradinho" (fits better rhythmically), or conversely, "É hora, hora" (It's the hour). This tagline marks the end of the ladainha and the beginning of the chula, or more properly louvação (praise).

=== Louvação ===
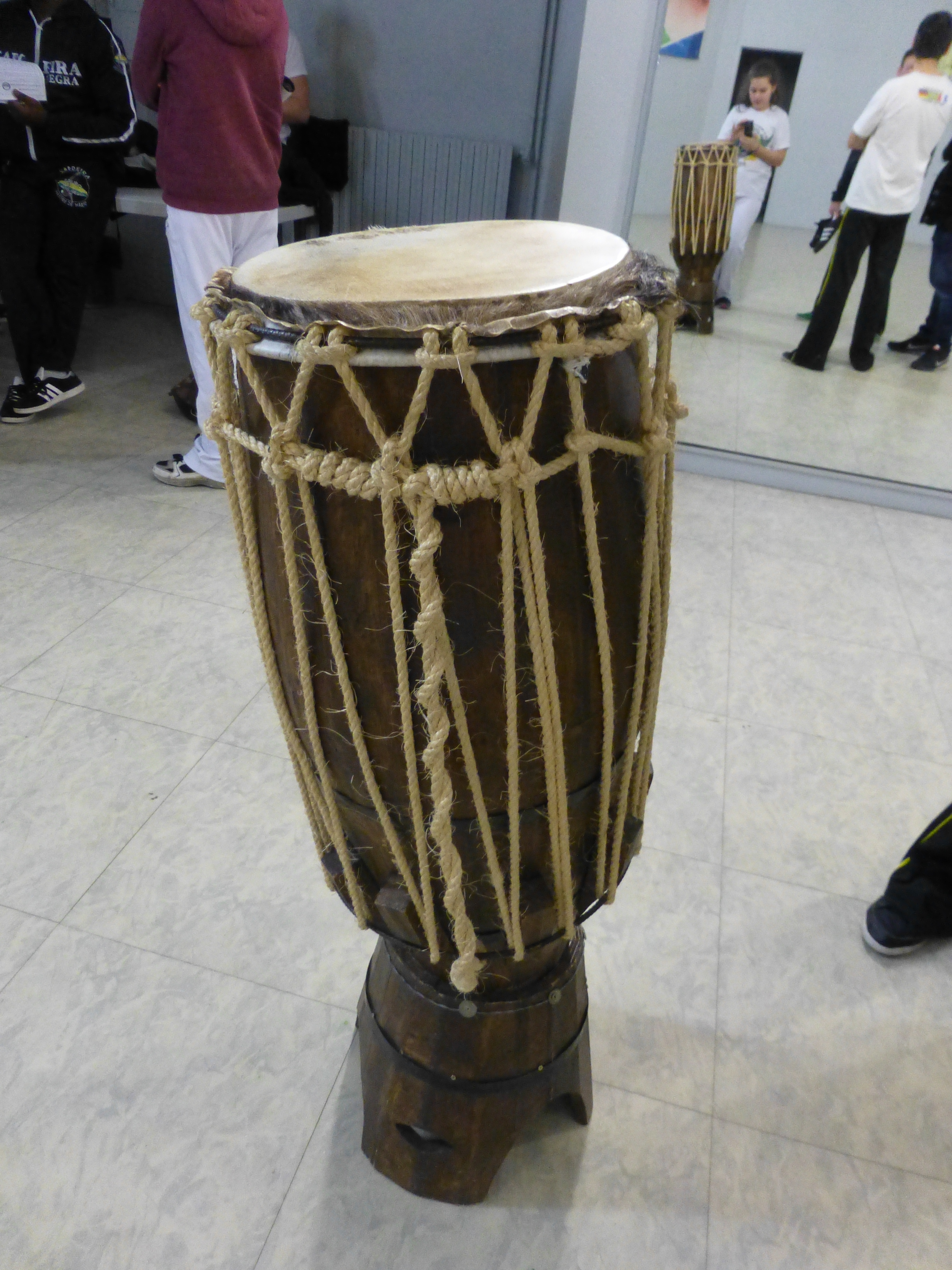
Capoeira African drum.

The louvação begins the call and response section of the roda. The louvação invokes God, Mestres, capoeira, and gives thanks. This section are also called chulas (Italicized line is the response).

Portuguese

Iê, Viva meu Deus
Iê, Viva meu Deus, camará
Iê, Viva meu Mestre
Iê, Viva meu Mestre, camará
Iê, quem me ensinou
Iê, quem me ensinou, camará
Iê, a capoeira
Iê, a capoeira, camará
É Água de beber
Iê, Água de beber, camará
É ferro de bater
Iê, ferro de bater, camará
É ngoma de ngoma
Iê, ngoma de ngoma, camará

English translation

Long live my God
Long live my God, comrade
Long live my Teacher
Long live my Teacher, comrade
Who taught me
Who taught me, comrade
Capoeira
Capoeira, comrade
It is water for drinking
It is water for drinking, comrade
It is Iron for striking
It is Iron for striking, comrade
It is from the sacred drums
It is from the sacred drums, comrade

The content of the louvação can be improvised as well, so having a good ear is critical to singing the chorus. The louvação, just as the ladainha, is strophic, but there is no variation in the melody from one louvação to another. However while it is most often sung in a major tonality, sometimes it can be heard in minor if the ladainha is also minor. The chorus is sung in unison, though an occasional harmonization, usually a third above, is sometimes used as a punctuation by one of the singers.

The two players/jogadores having sat at the pé-de-berimbau, or foot of the berimbau, during the ladainha, begin the game at the start of the corridos.

=== Corrido ===
The corridos are overlapping call and response typical of African singing, and influenced by, and borrowing from the Sambas de Roda of Bahia. Unlike the Mexican Corrido which is a form of folk ballad, the Bahian corrido is a short song with a usually static response. The chorus is often indicated by being used as the first line in the song:

Portuguese

Ai, ai, Aidê
oiá Joga bonito que eu quero ver
Ai, ai, aidê
oiá Joga bonito que eu quero aprender
Ai, ai, aidê
oiá nossa senhora quem vai me protejer

English translation

Ai, ai, Aidê (a girl's name)
Play beautifully so I can see
Ai, ai, Aidê
Play beautifully so I can learn
Ai, ai, Aidê
Our Lady will protect me

The corrido communicates with the action in the roda (though without the level of interaction in a traditional samba de roda) to inspire the players, to comment directly on the action, invokes, praises, warns, tells stories, and teaches moral values. There is a corrido for welcoming the roda, for closing the roda, asking for the players to play less aggressively, more aggressively, to not grab the other person, and the list continues. Corridos can also be challenges (desafios). The lead will sing a corrido then after some time sing one very similar, requiring the chorus (everyone else save the two playing in the roda) to be paying close attention to sing the correct response or two singers can switch corridos on a certain subject. This use of the corrido in a roda is more rare, requiring a bit more expertise on the part of the singers than normal. The desafio/challenge can be used with ladainhas as well. The corridos have the broadest melodic variation from one to the next, though many corridos share the same melodies. Thus a vast repertoire of corridos can be learned and improvisation within corridos becomes a less daunting prospect. Like the louvação, the corrido response is sung in unison, and like the louvação an occasional harmonization, usually a third above, is used as a punction by one of the singers.

=== Quadra ===
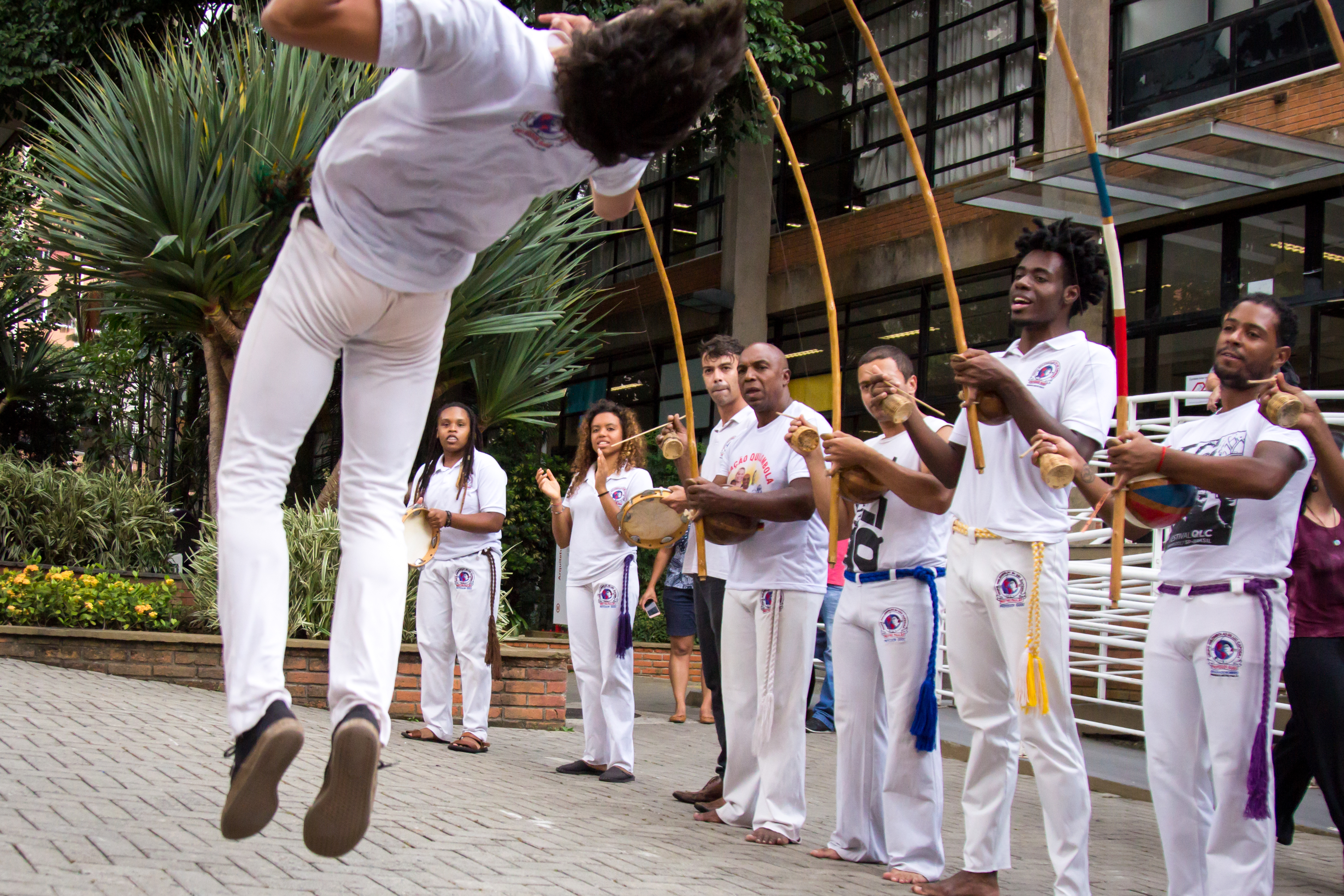
Street capoeira music with acrobatics

An innovation of Mestre Bimba, quadras take the place of the ladainha in some Regional and Contemporânea capoeira schools. They are four, eight, twelve (...) verse songs sung solo followed by the louvação. The main difference between the ladainha and quadra is that the quadra, like the corrido, doesn't have a standard melodic model and exhibits a greater variety melody. Quadras also exist as a special type of corrido with four line solo verses followed by the choral response, such as the following:

Capenga ontem teve aqui
Capenga ontem teve aqui
Deu dois mil réis a papai
Três mil réis a mamãe

Café e açúcar a vovó
Deu dois vintém a mim
Sim senhor, meu camará
Quando eu entrar, você entra
Quando eu sair, você sai

Passar bem, passar mal
Mas tudo no mundo é passar
Ha ha ha
Água de beber

=== Chula ===
The term chula is often given to the call and response louvação immediately following the ladainha. By comparison, traditionally in Bahia the chula is the free form song text of the Samba de Roda sung between the dances (as in the samba parada) and defines the structures of the various other "styles" of samba de roda, while the samba corrido lasts as long as the singer feels like singing it before moving on to another. The chula is a poetic form based on the quadra (quatrain) form (which may have influenced Mestre Bimba's replacement of ladainhas with quadras) with its roots in Iberia. The word chula comes from the word chulo meaning "vulgar", common, rustic (similarly the Spanish word chulo/chulito is used for peasant Indians in the Americas), being often pastoral and sentimental.

How the term chula came to refer to the louvação isn't currently known. But its similarity to the ladainha and the use of corrido songs from the samba de roda tradition probably played a large role.

== Melody and Rhythm ==
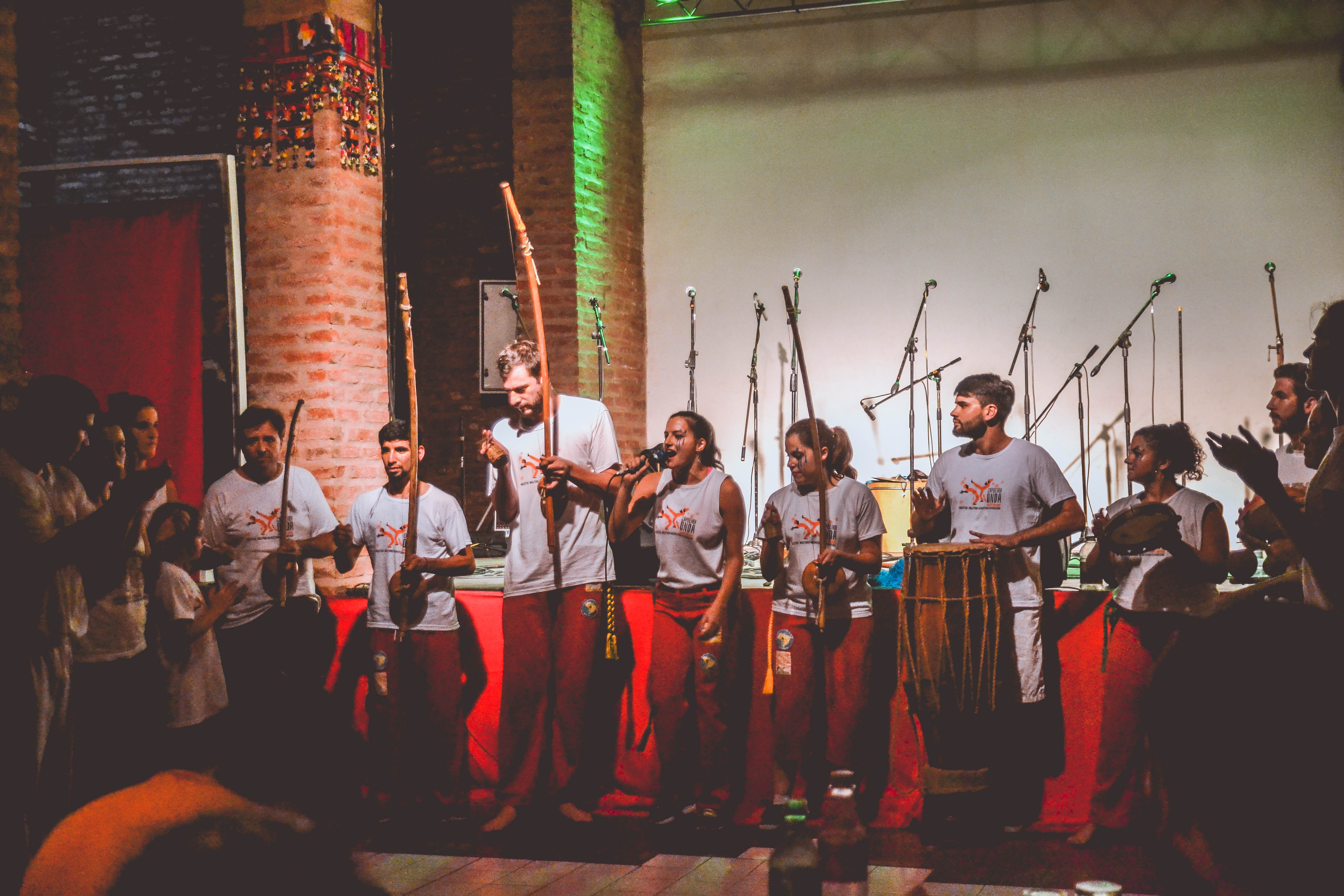
Capoeira music on festival

The melodies range from a fifth above (sometimes up to a sixth) and a third below the tonic: A (B) C D E (F) G (A), where C is tonic, the leading tone (B), fourth (f) and the sixth (A) are generally avoided. See Degree (music). The ladainha may include the fourth below the tonic at the cadence as a tagline with "camaradinho" to signal the beginning of the louvação. Rather than a tonic-dominant relationship, the ladainhas exhibit a tonic-supertonic progression (incidentally bossa nova exhibits a similar tendency for unrelated reasons) where harmonic tension is always on the 2nd scale degree, D in the key of C.

- NB. The berimbaus have a harmonic potential, but are not necessarily tuned to the singers' voices. If they are, then it will be generally the high note of the gunga as that is where the ladainha begins and as such doesn't create a dissonant 2nd interval between the two. That's not a strict rule in that many examples can be found where the singer tunes his or her voice to the low note instead. This has the effect of categorizing the music as mixolydian, a common feature of Brazilian music in the Northeast of Brazil. Whether or not one hears it in mixolydian or major is debatable. The beginning yell of Iê is commonly a fifth above the tonic and this sets the key.

Rhythmically, the music is in 4/4 time, common for music in the Angolan region of Africa, where the rhythms of both Brazilian samba and Cuban guaguancó have their origins. The singing is in Portuguese with some Kikongo and Yoruba words and phrases. The lyrics align themselves with the rhythm of the music, sometimes coming in on the strong beats, sometimes on the weak beats and pickups, depending on the vagaries of the song. It is theorized that the rhythms of capoeira are indeed from Angola, however, the introduction of the berimbau to capoeira was relatively recent (at least since the late 19th century) and the original songs, instrumentation, and rhythms are now lost. Capoeira in its earlier form was accompanied by omar in kikongo, hand clapping, and percussion accompaniment on a transverse hand drum. Since then, a number of instruments, including whistles, castanets, and violas (small Brazilian guitars), and likely any instrument available, have been used into the early 20th century.

The berimbau itself has been a folk instrument for solo song accompaniment and worship and became a mainstay of the roda when metal wire was widely available for use as a string. Before then, berimbaus were strung with plant fibers and thus could not project as loudly as with metal (nowadays, the wire is culled from used car and bicycle tires). Brass wire was observed being used on berimbaus, though, as early as 1824 in Rio. The caxixi's inclusion with the berimbau is another recent innovation that gives the berimbau an extra bit of punch. A theory goes that berimbaus were fitted with metal blades at the top which made them a defensive weapon when playing capoeira openly (which was essentially outlawed until the 1930s) was a dangerous affair.

=== Minor Tonality Ladainhas ===
The minor tonality ladainhas are rarer but have precedence. Mestre Traira demonstrates their use in his CD, Mestre Traira: Capoeira da Bahia. He uses a minor pentatonic scale:

(G) A C D E G (tonic at A)

This produces an interesting variation on the more common Ladainha melody. The Louvação is in the same pentatonic with the correspónding corridos reworked in the pentatonic as well.

=== Syncopation ===
Unlike the majority of Brazilian music, the syncopation in this music is a bit more subtle, relying on the interplay between the rhythm of the lyrics and the weak and strong beats of the isorhythmic cells played by the instruments, shifting the feeling of the downbeat from corrido to corrido, and interlocking/overlapping call and response driving the music forward. Below are two musical bars separated by the bar line |. The downbeats are defined as 1 and 3, the upbeats as 2 and 4, and the anticipation, or pick up, lies between 4 and 1.

1.2.3.4.|1.2.3.4.

The Angola and São Bento Pequeno rhythms for which capoeira Angola is known for, create a syncopation through silence on 3, and stressing 4 with two short buzzed notes (see berimbau). The São Bento Grande rhythm stresses both downbeats on the berimbaus which has the effect of a driving march (played in a quick double time tempo). The atabaque serves as the heart beat of the music, providing a steady pulse on 1 and 3 with open tones, often with an anticipation to 1, and a muted bass on 2.:

O.B.O..O|O.B.O..O, O = open tone, B = bass.

The agogô, a double bell tuned to an open fourth or fifth, plays:

L.H.L...|L.H.L..., L = low bell strike, H = high

Reco-reco, likewise

X.X.X...|X.X.X..., X = scrape

The pandeiro, has a bit more freedom than the other instruments

O.S.O.xx|O.S.O.xx, O = open tone, S = slap, xx = shake.

Another version provides

O.S.Otpt|O.S.Otpt, where t = strike with ring, middle, and index finger near the rim, and p = palm

The final t can be replaced with an open tone using the middle finger a little further away from the rim.
The effect of the supporting instruments together, is to build tension from an anticipation just before 1 (the third open note played by the atabaque) to 2, and resolution on 3, which then pushes the cell forward with the anticipation at the pick up to 1. As the berimbaus play with and against this framework along with the song verses, a surprising amount of syncopation results, despite the simple nature of the patterns. There is very little room allowed for improvisation in these supporting instruments. To allow otherwise would tend to distract too much from the content of the songs and the action inside the roda, as well as compete for attention with the berimbaus. There is still room, however, for occasional variations on the basic rhythms by the supporting instruments, especially when the overall energy of the roda is fairly high.

The berimbau toques follow the pattern of the supporting instruments, but with a broad arena for improvising. The above on syncopation also follows with the berimbau. In the case of the Angola toque (the half notes below in this case represent unmuted quarter notes):

The silence at 3 gives a lilt to the feeling of resolution, while the São Bento Grande toque

contrasts with a greater sense of finality at 3.

The viola berimbau, the highest pitched of the three, adds a layer of rhythmic improvisation, similar to the role of the quinto (drum) in Cuban rumba, though without the layer of rhythmic possibilities allowed for in rumba (which uses at least nine subdivisions of the bar). The following illustrates the possible subdivisions for improvisation in capoeira music in a single four beat bar:

0_______0_______0_______ 1/2 time triplets
0_____0_____0_____0_____ Melodic Pace (0 represents 1, 2, 3, and 4 respectively)
0___0___0___0___0___0___ Triplets
0__0__0__0__0__0__0__0__ Basic subdivision
0_0_0_0_0_0_0_0_0_0_0_0_ Double time triplets (used in calls by the Gunga, tempo permitting)

- N.B. The performance of the supporting instruments, and indeed the berimbaus and songs themselves can and have changed over the years, becoming highly codified, while exact performance standards can still vary from group to group. Mario de Andrade's Missão de Pesquisas Folcóricas recorded in 1938 show an interpretation of the music that is slightly different, with two atabaques with a more active role in one example. For better or for worse, one is not likely to see two atabaques in one roda.

== Importance of music ==
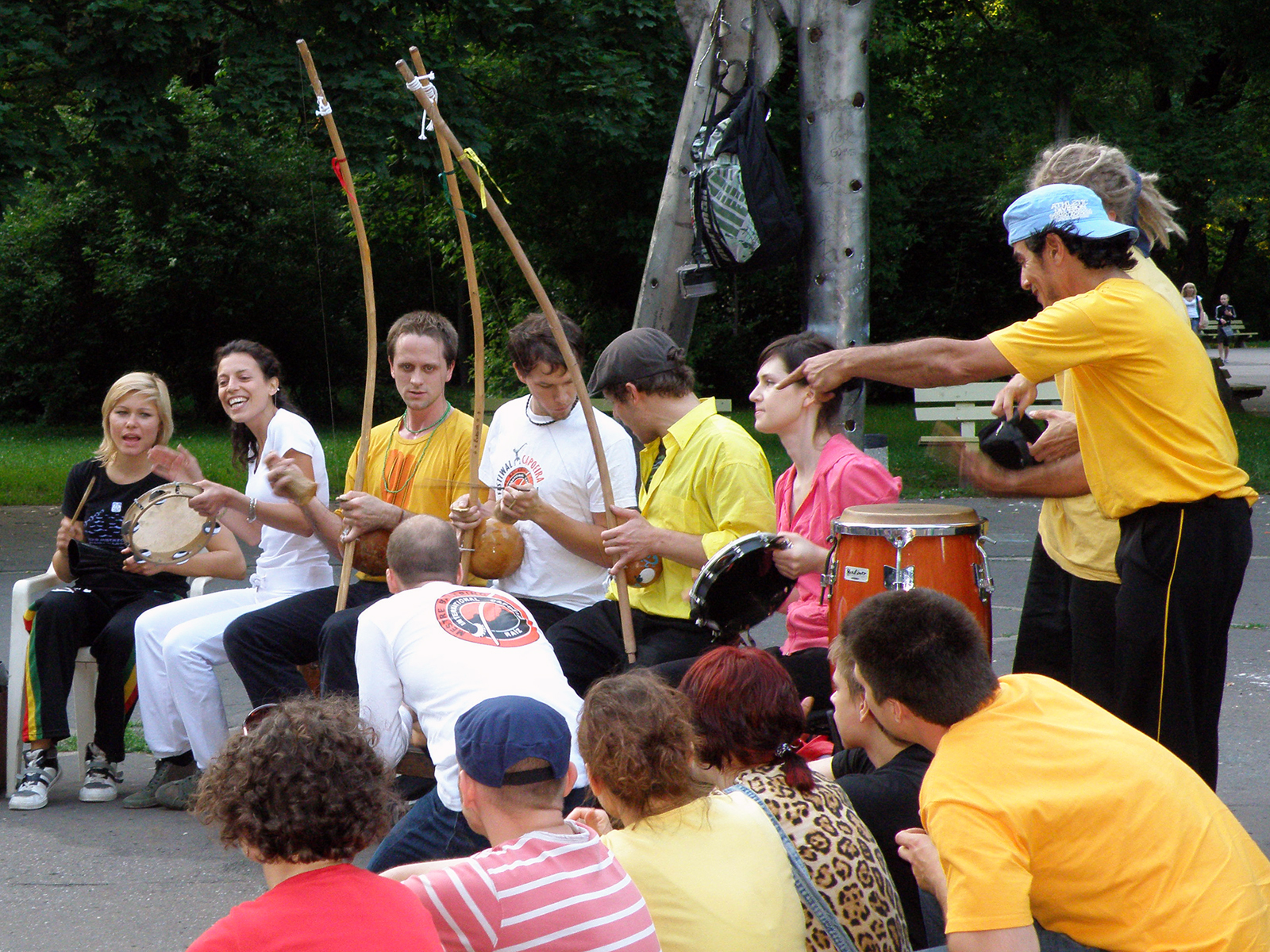
Capoeira music in Warszawa, Park Praski, 2010.

The Bantu peoples, among whom capoeira originated, believe that music can communicate between the various spheres and penetrate to the other world. In the Congo, big conga drum, known as ngoma, is of great importance. They transmitted messages to warriors, in a language that was familiar to them.

Mestre Pastinha always emphasized the role of music and singing in capoeira game:

Capoeira is only beautiful when playing and singing and only loses its beauty when people don't sing. It is the duty of all capoeiristas. It is not a failing not to know how to sing, but it is a failing not to know how to reply, at least to the chorus.

In today's capoeira outside Brazil, students who aren't proficient in Portuguese encounter challenges in singing and comprehending the lyrics. Their unfamiliarity with Afro-Brazilian rhythms makes it more difficult for them to seamlessly integrate capoeira toques into their ginga. Consequently, novice and even intermediate students may be hesitant to engage in singing and playing instruments, instead favoring flashy movements. This, in turn, perpetuates the disconnection between music and movements, resulting in a less rhythmic ginga that capoeira instructors struggle so hard to improve.

== Literature ==
- Balfour, Henry (1976) [1899]. The Natural History of the Musical Bow; a Chapter in the Developmental History of Stringed Instruments of Music: Primitive Types. Portland, Me.: Longwood Press. OCLC 1819773.
- Capoeira, Nestor (2002). Capoeira: Roots of the Dance-Fight-Game. Blue Snake Books. ISBN 978-1-58394-637-4.
- Assunção, Matthias Röhrig (2002). Capoeira: The History of an Afro-Brazilian Martial Art. Routledge. ISBN 978-0-7146-8086-6.
- Capoeira, Nestor (2007). The Little Capoeira Book. Blue Snake Books. ISBN 9781583941980.
- Talmon-Chvaicer, Maya (2008). The Hidden History of Capoeira: A Collision of Cultures in the Brazilian Battle Dance. University of Texas Press. ISBN 978-0-292-71723-7.
- Desch-Obi, M. Thomas J. (2008). Fighting for Honor: The History of African Martial Art Traditions in the Atlantic World. Columbia: University of South Carolina Press. ISBN 978-1-57003-718-4.
