= Pé de Chumbo =

Capoeira mestre

Mestre Pe de Chumbo
- Born: Gidalto Pereira Dias; December 8, 1964 (age 61)
- Origin: Floresta Azul, Bahia, Brazil
- Genres: Capoeira; Brazilian Folklore
- Occupations: Capoeira Angola Mestre, Musician, Educator
- Instruments: Berimbau, Atabaque, Pandeiro, Agogo, Reco-Reco
- Years active: 1974–present
- Label: CECA
- Website: [www.mestrepedechumbo.hpg.ig.com.br/mpedechumbo.htm]
- Lineage: Mestre Joao Pequeno de Pastinha

Pé de Chumbo is a master of Capoeira Angola, an Afro-Brazilian martial art, and a student of João Pequeno's. This mestre is one of the few capoeira angola mestres who carry on the Centro Esportivo de Capoeira Angola (CECA) school created by Mestre Pastinha. He has academies in Brazil and in Europe - including several academies in Sweden, Portugal, Mexico City, Germany and the United States. Mestre Pé de Chumbo (literally Master Foot of Lead) was one of the first capoeira angola masters to take the Bahian art form to São Paulo and is known in capoeira circles for his low ground movements, dedication to his master and focus on the traditional aspects of the capoeira game.

== Biography ==
Mestre Pé de Chumbo was born December 8, 1964, in Floresta Azul, a small town in the interior of Bahia. He began the practice of capoeira at the age of 10 in his small Bahian town. At the age of 16, Pé de Chumbo traveled to the southern state of São Paulo Brazil in search of employment and brought capoeira with him. Settling in Indiatuba, São Paulo he began balancing his full-time job with his practice and teaching of capoeira. During this time he had the opportunity to meet various notable mestres such as Mestre Suassuna, Miguel Machado, Silvestre, Belisco, Mestre Brazilia, and Mestre Gato Preto among others. The young capoeira teacher was especially inspired by Mestre Paulo dos Anjos and began to develop a passion for the traditional form of capoeira angola.

By 1981, Pé de Chumbo had become intrigued by the Angolan style of capoeira and decided to travel to Salvador to meet Mestre Pastinha, the grandfather of capoeira angola. But Pastinha's death occurred a few days prior to Pe de Chumbo's arrival, so he began training with Pastinha's lead students, Mestre Joao Pequeno and Mestre Joao Grande instead. During the following years, Pe de Chumbo would travel between work and capoeira, constantly bringing new knowledge from Mestre Joao Pequeno to his students in São Paulo.

Starting in 1987, Mestre Pé de Chumbo began bringing such renowned Mestres as João Gande, João Pequeno and Boca Rica to São Paulo during large capoeira events, and in 1991 he brought Mestre Jogo de Dentro to the city. It was during this time that the capoeira mestre moved to Sao Carlos to begin another capoeira group. It was also during this time that Mestre Pé de Chumbo was graduated as a mestre under João Pequeno, who encouraged Pé de Chumbo to use the CECA school name and uniform.

Mestre Pé de Chumbo began taking capoeira out of the country in 1990s with his mestre's blessing. He established schools throughout Europe in the late 1990s and early 2000s. As of 2006, Mestre Pé de Chumbo has established schools throughout Brazil and in Sweden, Denmark, Portugal, Mexico City and the United States.

Currently, Mestre Pé de Chumbo is establishing a new capoeira academy in Germany where he currently lives and teaches.

== Lineage of Pé de Chumbo ==
Pastinha
João Pequeno
Barba Branca	Jogo de Dentro	Ciro	Pé de Chumbo	Eletricista	Faisca	Pintor
