= João =

- Pronunciation: English: /ʒuˈaʊn/ zhoo-OWN; Portuguese: [ʒuˈɐ̃w]
- Gender: Male

Origin
- Origin: Hebrew, via Portuguese
- Meaning: "YHWH has been gracious", "graced by YHWH" (Yohanan)

Other names
- Related names: John, Jean, Evan, Giovanni, Hannes, Hans, Juan, Hovhannes, Ian, Iain, Ioan, Ioane, Ivan, Iven, Ifan, Jack, Jackson, Jan, Jane, Janez, Jhon, Joan, Johan/Johann, Johanan, Johannes, Jonne, Jovan, Juhani, Seán, Eoin, Shane, Siôn, Xoán, Yahya, Yohannes

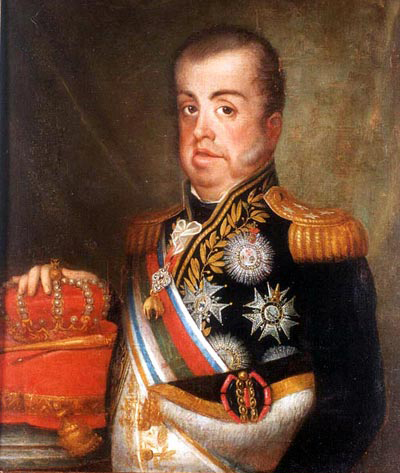
João VI of Portugal

João is a given name of Portuguese and Hebrew origin. It is equivalent to the given name John. The diminutive is Joãozinho and the feminine is Joana. It is widespread in Portuguese-speaking countries. Notable people with the name are enumerated in the sections below.

== Kings ==
- João I of Portugal
- João II of Portugal
- João III of Portugal
- João IV of Portugal
- João V of Portugal
- João VI of Portugal
- João I of Kongo, ruled 1470–1509
- João II of Lemba or João Manuel II of Kongo, ruled 1680–1716
- Dom João Dharmapala Peria Bandara, last King of the Kingdom of Kotte, reigned 1551–1597

== Princes ==
- João Manuel, Prince of Portugal (1537–1554), son of John III
- Infante João, Duke of Beja (1842–1861)

== Arts and literature ==
- João Borsch, Portuguese musician
- João Bosco, Brazilian musician
- João Canijo (1957–2026), Portuguese film director
- Joao Constancia, Filipino singer, actor and dancer
- João de Deus de Nogueira Ramos, Portuguese poet
- João Donato, Brazilian musician
- João Gilberto, Brazilian musician
- João Simões Lopes Neto, Brazilian writer
- João Frederico Ludovice, German-born Portuguese architect and goldsmith
- João Abel Manta, Portuguese architect, painter, illustrator and cartoonist
- João Cabral de Melo Neto, Brazilian poet and diplomat
- João Miguel (actor), Brazilian actor
- João César Monteiro, Portuguese film director
- João Nogueira, Brazilian musician
- João Vasco Paiva, Portuguese artist
- Maria João Pires, Portuguese pianist
- João Ubaldo Ribeiro, Brazilian writer, journalist, and professor
- João do Rio, Brazilian writer
- João Pedro Rodrigues, Portuguese film director
- João Guimarães Rosa, Brazilian novelist, short story writer, and diplomat

== Sportspeople ==
=== Footballers ===
- João Félix, Portuguese footballer
- João Neves, Portuguese footballer
- João Moutinho, Portuguese footballer
- João Mário (footballer, born January 1993), Portuguese footballer
- João Pereira (disambiguation), several Portuguese footballers
- João Pinto, Portuguese footballer
- João Cancelo, Portuguese footballer
- João Tomás, Portuguese footballer
- Lucas João, Portuguese/Angolan footballer
- Joãozinho (footballer, born 1988), Brazilian footballer
- João Pedro (footballer, born 2001), Brazilian footballer
- João Paulo (footballer, born 1991), Brazilian footballer

=== Other sportspeople ===
- João Almeida (cyclist), Portuguese road cyclist
- João Barbosa, Portuguese racing driver
- João Brenha, Portuguese beach volleyball player
- João Matos Cunha, Brazilian para athlete
- João Cunha e Silva, Portuguese tennis player
- João Fonseca (tennis), Brazilian tennis player
- João Havelange, Brazilian president of FIFA from 1974 to 1998
- João José, Portuguese volleyball player
- João Moreira, jockey currently based in Hong Kong
- João José Pereira, Portuguese triathlete
- João Sousa, Portuguese tennis player
- João Souza, Brazilian tennis player
- João Souza (fencer), Brazilian fencer

== Other people ==
- João Amoêdo, Brazilian engineer and company administrator
- João Biehl, Brazilian anthropologist
- João Cravinho (1936–2025), Portuguese politician
- João Gomes Cravinho (born 1964), Portuguese diplomat and politician, son of João Cravinho
- João Dias (born 1973), Portuguese politician
- João Doria, Brazilian politician
- João Teixeira de Faria, Brazilian faith healer
- João Armando Gonçalves, head of the World Organization of the Scout Movement
- João Goulart, 27th president of Brazil
- João Lourenço, current President of Angola and previous Minister of Defence
- João Magueijo, Portuguese cosmologist
- João Marinho Neto (born 1912), Brazilian supercentenarian, current world's oldest living man
- João da Nova, 15th-century Portuguese explorer
- João Ramalho (1493–1582), Portuguese explorer and adventurer, attributed as the first bandeirante
- João Rodrigues Cabrilho, 16th-century Portuguese explorer
- João de Trasto, 15th-century Portuguese explorer
- João Gonçalves Zarco, Portuguese navigator, co-discoverer of the Madeira islands
- John of God or João de Deus, Iberian saint

== Fictional characters ==
- João, a non-playable Mii opponent in the Wii series

== See also ==
- São João (disambiguation), Portuguese for Saint John
- João and the Knife, a 1972 Dutch-Brazilian film by George Sluizer
- John of Portugal (disambiguation), multiple people
