= Mestre Curió =

Mestre Curió is a capoeira Angola mestre from Salvador, Brazil, known for his deceptive fighting style. He was a disciple of mestre Pastinha.

Curió has been known to feign injuries, call women from the audience into the roda for protection, and threaten opponents with hidden weapons. He also uses a variety of facial expressions, shouts, and pauses to distract his opponents. Many capoeira players consider Curió to be the most dangerous mestre because of his unpredictable and creative fighting style.

== See also ==
- Capoeira Angola

== Works cited ==
- Varela, Sergio González (2017). Power in Practice: The Pragmatic Anthropology of Afro-Brazilian Capoeira. Berghahn Books. ISBN 9781785336355.
