= Xoana =

Xoana is a Galician feminine given name. It can be a variant of Jane/Joanna or the female form of Xoán.

Notable people with the name include:

- Xoana Iacoi (born 1992), Argentine handball player
- Xoana González, contestant of Soñando por Bailar 2011

== See also ==
- Alternate forms for the name John
