= International Capoeira Angola Foundation =

The logo of the Fundação Internacional de Capoeira Angola (FICA) features a zebra coming out of the African continent and meeting a Brazilian capoerista.

ICAF (International Capoeira Angola Foundation) or FICA (Fundaçao Internacional de Capoeira de Angola) is the name of a capoeira angola group. FICA is the group's name in Brazil, which is an acronym for Fundacao International de Capoeira de Angola, while it is ICAF in English, which stands for the International Capoeira Angola Foundation. The English name is a literal translation of the words which make up the acronym FICA.

The word "fica" in Portuguese means "you stay" (second person declarative) which is not necessarily significant, but because it has a meaning it is slightly more catchy in Portuguese than ICAF is in English. FICA/ICAF is the largest Capoeira Angola organization in the world, consisting of many local chapters incorporated as not-for-profits in the United States which charge nominal annual membership fees, as well as having locations in many other countries.

The three founders of FICA are Mestre Cobra Mansa, Mestre Jurandir, and Mestre Valmir. As of 2020, there are 12 Mestres of FICA: The three founders, Mestre Silvinho, Mestre Leninho Sa, Mestre Gunter, Mestre Fabio, Mestre Beto, Mestre Kamau, Mestre Kojo, Mestre Skher, and Mestre Santemu. Former leaders of FICA include Mestra Gege and Mestre Rogerinho.

== See also ==
- Capoeira Angola
- Cobra Mansa
