= Pedro Moraes Trindade =

Capoeira master

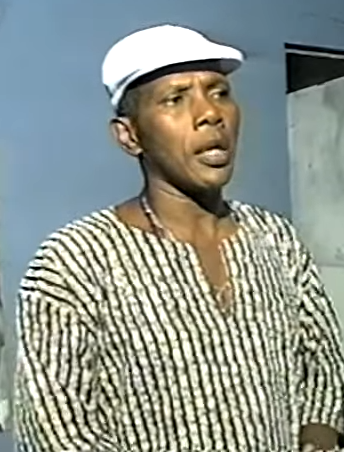
Mestre Moraes in 1997

Pedro Moraes Trindade, commonly known as Mestre Moraes, (born February 9, 1950, in Ilha de Maré in Salvador, Brazil) is a master of capoeira.

He lives in Salvador, Bahia, teaching at a public school and overseeing GCAP, which serves as a cultural outreach project, training both older visiting students and children who lack direction for channeling their energies.

Meste Moraes was student of João Grande and the teacher of Cobra Mansa.

== Biography ==
Moraes was born on the island of Maré in the Bay of All The Saints, one of the legendary locations celebrated in capoeira songs, and was raised in Salvador.

His father was also a practitioner of capoeira Angola, the traditional style of Bahia.

=== In Pastinha's academy ===
At the age of eight, he started to train at the academy of Mestre Pastinha. By that time Pastinha was blind with and no longer taught classes, so academy was run by his students João Grande and João Pequeno. He states that he is truly the student of João Grande due to the impression made on the young Moraes by the inspiring way that João Grande played capoeira.

=== Rio years ===
Moraes joined the Marines and was relocated to Rio de Janeiro in the early 1970s. By 1974, he had already begun instructing capoeira Angola in the northern suburb of Belfort Roxo. He also led the Modá-Ruê group, which taught residents of Rio de Janeiro about 'Northeastern folklore,' encompassing practices like maculelê, samba de roda, puxada de rede, and even lamento africano. To preserve and transmit his mentors' teachings, he founded Grupo Capoeira Angola Pelourinho (GCAP) in 1980.

What set Moraes apart from many other Bahians in Rio was his unwavering commitment to playing Angola, even when faced with practitioners of different styles, whether they were ring fighters or swift athletes from Senzala. According to Mestre Marco Aurélio, word spread about "an African was visiting the rodas of the city, who played a different capoeira". Salvadorian capoeiristas visiting Rio often found themselves facing aggressive opponents focused on efficiency rather than ritualistic, playful games. When Moraes played, he didn't rely on high-kick sequences but consistently adhered to the inner game of Angola, known as jogo de dentro. Moraes not only skillfully avoided kicks but sometimes even 'slapped the guy on his bottom’.

=== Back to Salvador ===
In 1982, Moraes and his top student, Cobra Mansa, relocated to Salvador. Following Pastinha's passing in 1981, capoeira Angola appeared to be heading towards extinction, as many older mestres had retired or significantly embraced the regional style.

Moraes and Cobrinha Mansa's return revitalized the Salvador capoeira community. At the time, capoeira Angola was often seen as an art for elderly men. However, their youthful presence challenged this notion and showcased potential of capoeira angola. Mestre João Grande even agreed to teach again for GCAP after a six-year absence.

The group not only focused on capoeira but also capoeira history and black culture. His aim was to return to capoeira's African, specifically Angolan roots. Moraes is a strong advocate of the Angola style of capoeira, and believes that the source of capoeira is the n'golo, ritual combat performed by Bantu people in southwestern Angola.

Moraes codified the Angolan musical style, and defined its basic instrumental ensemble, and requires GCAP's members to be versed in all aspects of capoeira Angola's music.

== Moraes on capoeira ==
Moraes has stated his idea of capoeira Angola's basic philosophy:

The capoeira ring, whose geometric form facilitates the propagation of energy, is one of the symbolic representations of the 'macro' world. The movements we make inside this ring symbolise the adversities we encounter in life, which we often don't know how to deal with. In the game of life, our opponents, in most cases, know nothing of capoeira, but have movements peculiar to their own game, which we should be able to interpret and understand in their context, taking the capoeira ring as a point of reference. Playing in the ring, we succeed in establishing a fusion between playful elements and respect for the other person. But the ring isn't reality: the world is. If we win in this ring, we can take the other one too!

== Literature ==
- Assunção, Matthias Röhrig (2002). Capoeira: The History of an Afro-Brazilian Martial Art. Routledge. ISBN 978-0-7146-8086-6.

== See also ==
- João Grande
- João Pequeno
- Cobra Mansa
