= Xoán =

Xoán is Galician for John.

Notable people with the name include:

- Xoán Paredes (born in 1975), Galician geographer
- Xoán de Novoa (João da Nova), Spanish explorer, 1460–1509
- Xoán Gato (born 1946), Spanish politician

== See also ==
- João
- John (disambiguation)
- Juan
- Xohán de Cangas, a jograr or troubadour, around the thirteenth century
- San Xoán de Río, a municipality in Galicia (Spain)
- San Juan (disambiguation)
- São João (disambiguation)
- Alternate forms for the name John
- Xoana (disambiguation)
