= Antonio Neves Braga =

Brazilian Capoeira mestre

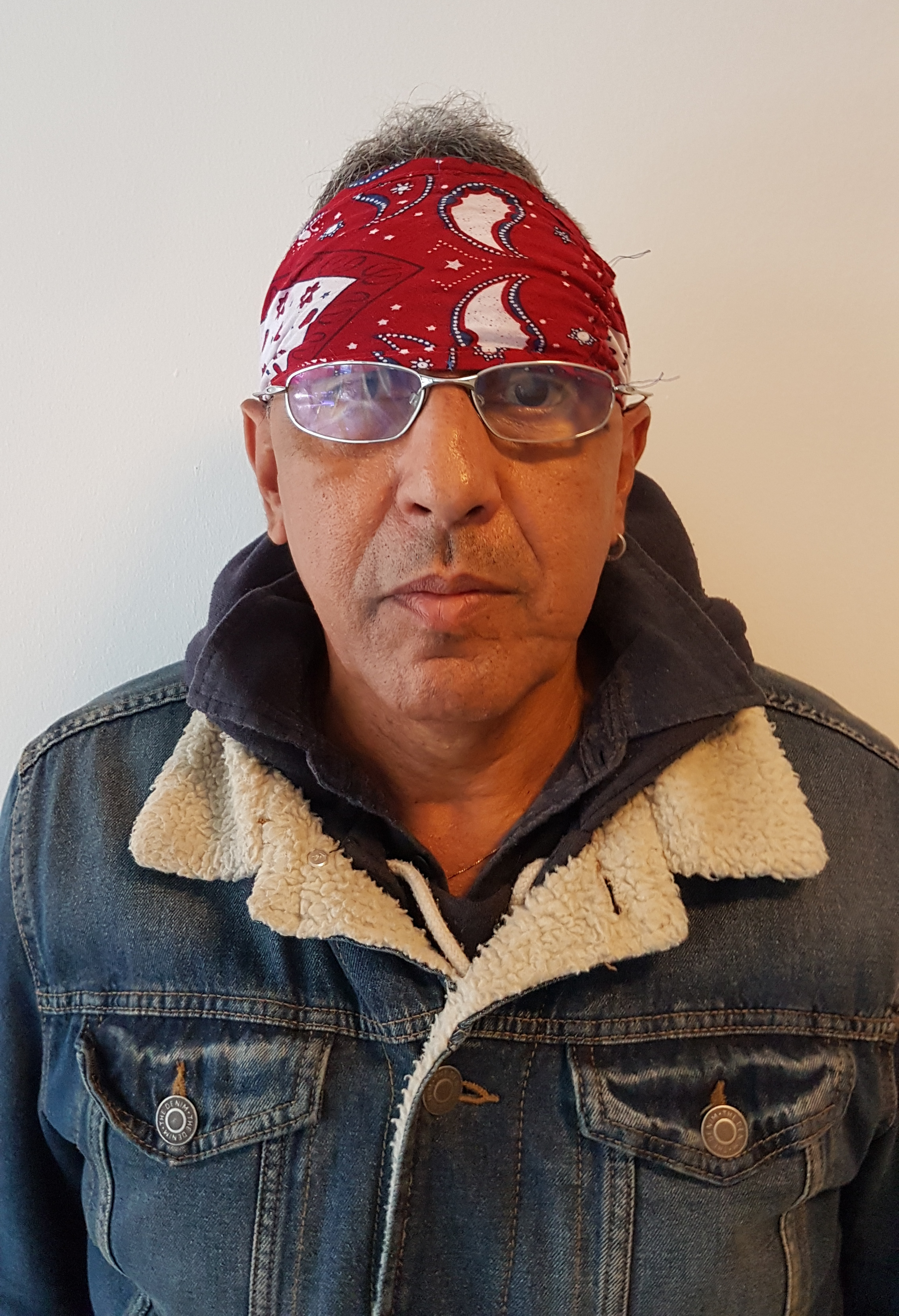
Antonio Neves Braga in May 2019

Mestre Braga (born Antonio Neves Braga; June 13, 1957, in Rio de Janeiro, Brazil) is a Mestre (a master practitioner) of the Afro-Brazilian martial art Capoeira Angola. He is the founder of the capoeira Angola group, Africa Bantu, and one of the founders of the Grupo de Capoeira Angola Pelourinho (GCAP).

== Formative years ==
Braga began practicing Capoeira in the early 1970s when at age 14 he joined the Capoeira Regional Palmares Group in Rio de Janeiro. There he encountered Mestres Roni, Zé Macaco and Cabelo Vermelho. After the group disbanded, he continued his practice of Capoeira with Mestre Touro and Dentinho (Grupo Corda Bamba).

In 1975 during the Rio de Janeiro carnival, Braga met Mestre Moraes at a roda in Central do Brazil. This would be the turning point in his evolution towards Capoeira Angola. Through Mestre Moraes, Braga discovered Capoeira Angola, a strand of Capoeira that originated from the teaching of Mestre Pastinha. Mestre Moraes’ Rio de Janeiro school was the first school to teach Capoeira Angola outside of Bahia. It was founded by Mestre Moraes after he moved from Salvador, Bahia to Rio de Janeiro for his military practice.

Mestre Braga trained in Capoeira Angola with Mestre Moraes and, on 16 December 1978, he received the title of mestre along with his colleagues Neco and Zé Carlos. In December 1979, together with Mestre Moraes, Mestre Braga made a trip to Salvador de Bahia where he visited Mestre Pastinha.

== Foundation of GCAP ==
In 1980, the GCAP association was founded. The idea behind the association originated from Mestre Neco; the association aimed to fight the Brazilian government’s prosecution of the African culture at the time. The label of the group, with a berimbau and two zebras fighting (as a reference to the African origins of Capoeira), was created by Braga. The association was meant to unite under the same label the masters of capoeira Angola from Rio (Moraes, Braga, Neco and Zé Carlos).

In 1982, Moraes returned to Salvador Bahia, leaving the three young masters full autonomy and the responsibility to continue his teachings. Prior to his departure, Mestre Moraes promoted Marco Aurelio to the rank of mestre.

== Present day ==
In 1994, Braga left GCAP and founded his own group, Grupo Africa Bantu G/ECAAB (1995). In 1997, after moving to Denmark, he established an Africa Bantu group in Aarhus and Copenhagen. Later, in 2002 he set up the Africa Bantu group in Geneva, Switzerland, where he still teaches today.

== Lineage ==
- The "lineage" of Capoeira Angola mestres under Mestre Pastinha
