= Mestre Leopoldina =

Brazilian velha guarda capoeira mestre

Mestre Leopoldina

Demerval Lopes de Lacerda (1933–2007), known as Mestre Leopoldina, was a Brazilian velha guarda (old guard) capoeira mestre. He was known for his quick and unique style of playing capoeira, as well as for his mastery of the berimbau and for the songs that he composed. He represented the old capoeira carioca, malicia and the traditional malandragem of capoeira.

== Early life ==
Demerval Lopes was born in Rio de Janeiro in 1933. He grew up without his mother, often beaten and neglected. He left his home at a young age, sleeping at the train stations and selling sweets on street. It is often said that he was nicknamed after one of Rio's train stations, but he stated that his nickname was after a locomotive. As a teenager, he went to Serviço de Assistência ao Menor, a Child Care Service.

== Career ==
In 1951, at the age of 18, he left Child Care Service and began selling newspapers. During the same time, he met Joaquim Felix who is known as Quinzinho, a dangerous young murderer and gang leader. Quinzinho was a capoeirista and was Leopoldina's first teacher in the art of “tiririca”, the capoeira of gangs without music. A few years later, Quinzinho was arrested again and murdered in prison.

Around 1954, Leopoldina became a disciple of Artur Emídio, who had recently arrived from Itabuna, Bahia, and began teaching Bahian capoeira that was played to the berimbau.

In the following years, Leopoldina went to work at Cais do Porto on the docks. He retired before the age of 45, due to a work accident (which left no serious consequences) and lived the life of a capoeirista.

Leopoldina also was a passionate samba performer.

In 1977, he participated in the film Cordão de Ouro.

== Death ==
He died on October 17 2007 in São José dos Campos, SP.
