= João Pereira =

João Pereira may refer to:

- João José Pereira (born 1987), Portuguese triathlete
- Jamba (footballer) (born 1977), Angolan footballer
- João Pereira (footballer, born 1984), Portuguese football manager and former right back
- João Pereira (footballer, born 1990), Portuguese central defender
- João Pereira (footballer, born 1992), Portuguese football manager and former forward
- João Pereira (footballer, born 1997), Bissau-Guinean forward
- João Carlos Pereira (born 1965), Portuguese football manager
- João Pereira (swimmer) (1905–1984), freestyle swimmer from Brazil
- José João Pereira (born 1981), East Timorese footballer
- João Pereira dos Santos (1917–2011), capoeira mestre
