= Joãozinho =

Joãozinho is a nickname of João, meaning "little João", and may refer to:

- Joãozinho (footballer, born 1954), Brazilian football forward João Soares Almeida Filho
- Joãozinho Neto (born 1980), Brazilian football forward
- Joãozinho (footballer, born 1988), Brazilian football winger João Natailton Ramos dos Santos
- Joãozinho (footballer, born 1989), Portuguese football left-back João Carlos Reis Graça
- Joãozinho (footballer, born 1997), Portuguese football midfielder João Pedro Martins Cunha Fernandes
