= Floresta Azul =

Municipality of Bahia, Brazil

- Municipality
- Location in Brazil
- Coordinates: 14°51′S 39°41′W
- Country: Brazil
- Region: Nordeste
- State: Bahia

Population (2020)
  - Total: 10,575
- Time zone: UTC−3 (BRT)

Floresta Azul is a municipality in the state of Bahia in the North-East region of Brazil. In 2020, it's estimated population was 10,575 residents.

Leadership

The first elected mayor of Floresta Azul was Themistocles Matos, or "Teta" Matos as he preferred to be called. Matos served as mayor from 1963 to 1966. Prior to his election, Matos administered the region for nearly 12 years and played a crucial role in developing the young town. By petitioning to have the town incorporated into the nation and recognized by the state, the administration of Floresta Azul became eligible to receive state and federal sponsorship for public service initiatives. There are multiple streets, schools, and churches named after his family and other members of governance.

His successor, Abidias Pedro dos Santos, took office from 1967 to 1970. Santos was well known in the region, as he also simultaneously served as the mayor to the neighboring city, Itabuna.

Raimundo Silva Cardoso succeeded Santos, serving as mayor from 1971 to 1972, again from 1977 to 1982, and finally from 1997 to 2000. In his near 13 years in office, Cardoso is remembered for his efforts to develop the neighborhood of "Coquinhos" – a neighborhood that was historically economically depressed.

Marcelino Guilherme Santana served in office from 1973 to 1976, and is most noted for the creation of Manuel Saturnino Square. This square, named after a popular good samaritan in the community.

Zely Teixeira de Carvalho also served between the term of Raimundo Silva Cardoso, between the years of 1983 to 1988. Carvalho was known as "Mineirao", which is a demonym for someone who is from the state of Minas Gerais. Given his popularity – he beat his opponents by a landslide during elections. However, his 6-year mandate was cut short when an accident took his life. He was succeeded by Antonio "Goiaba" Jose do Rosario. Antonio Jose do Rosario served from 1986 to 1988 and was previously the Vice Mayor of Zely Teixeira de Carvalho. His administration is noted for living in the shadow of his predecessors memory.

In 1988, Floresta Azul elected its first female mayor. Liete Carvalho Farias served in office from 1989 to 1992.

Raimundo Salvio's administration began in 2001 and lasted till 2004. He was the tenth mayor of the small town and he died one year after the end of his term.

Carlos Amilton Oliveira Santos is remembered as the mayor of Floresta Azul, commonly known as "Garrafão" – which translates to big bottle, a nod to his alleged vices. He served a total of 6 years (1993–1996 and 2005–2008) and his stint as mayor was marred by corruption scandals. It was revealed that his administration was pocketing public funds when town employees exposed that they hadn't received their paychecks for more than 15 months. His troubled record was enough to make him a major sought after by the law and ousted by the resident population. In his second term, the small town was plastered all over national newspapers in a scandal expose over the lending practices of Banco Matone. Multiple reports and judicial measures have ensured that he does not return to hold public office.

Sanda Maisa Balduino Cardoso Marcelino previously served as the secretary of health in the municipality of Floresta Azul from 1997 to 2000. She is an alumna of the Catholic University of Salvador (class of 1988), and is an active philanthropist in the town. She served as mayor from 2009-2016.

She was succeeded by Gicélia de Santana Oliveira Santos, who ran under the name "Glicéia do Garrafão". She served two terms: 2017-2020, and 2021-2024.

Hermanio Leonardo Santos Da Silva was elected as mayor in 2024.

Economy

Historically, the early settlers of southern Bahia were lured by the climate of the Atlantic Forrest. Moreover, the region's primary exports are Cacau and Brazilian Cherry Wood, locally known as Jatoba. The name of the town translates to "Blue Florest" which refers to the deep colors of its flora. Today there are 2,180 rural properties in the Municipality of Floresta Azul, with approximately 5,000 inhabitants living in the countryside, and 960 properties producing only Cocoa. The estimated quantity of production is approximately 60,000 arrobas produced per year. Moreover, an estimated 540 properties are exclusively for Livestock, with a total herd of 25,000 cattle. It is believed that approximately 20,200 cattle are distributed for consumption per month and 4,800 cows are used in the production of milk, with a monthly collection that reaches 90,000 liters.

Religion

While Brazil is a predominantly catholic country, the rise of Protestantism gained traction in the second half of the 20th century. Floresta Azul has not one, but two Seventh-Day Adventist Churches. There is the Seventh-Day Adventist Church of Teta Matos, built under the Themistocles Matos Administration, and the Seventh-Day Adventist Church II. Given the lack of communication, transportation, and sectarian literature between established American Seventh Day Adventist Communities and rural Brazilian ones, some local historians speculate that the presence of Sabbatarianism in the inlands of Brazil predates the arrival of the millerate, American-bred, Seventh-day Adventism and perhaps, denotes the presence of Marranos in the local community, that practiced in isolation till they had an entity to congregate under.

== See also ==
- List of municipalities in Bahia
