= João Grande =

Brazilian capoeira practitioner

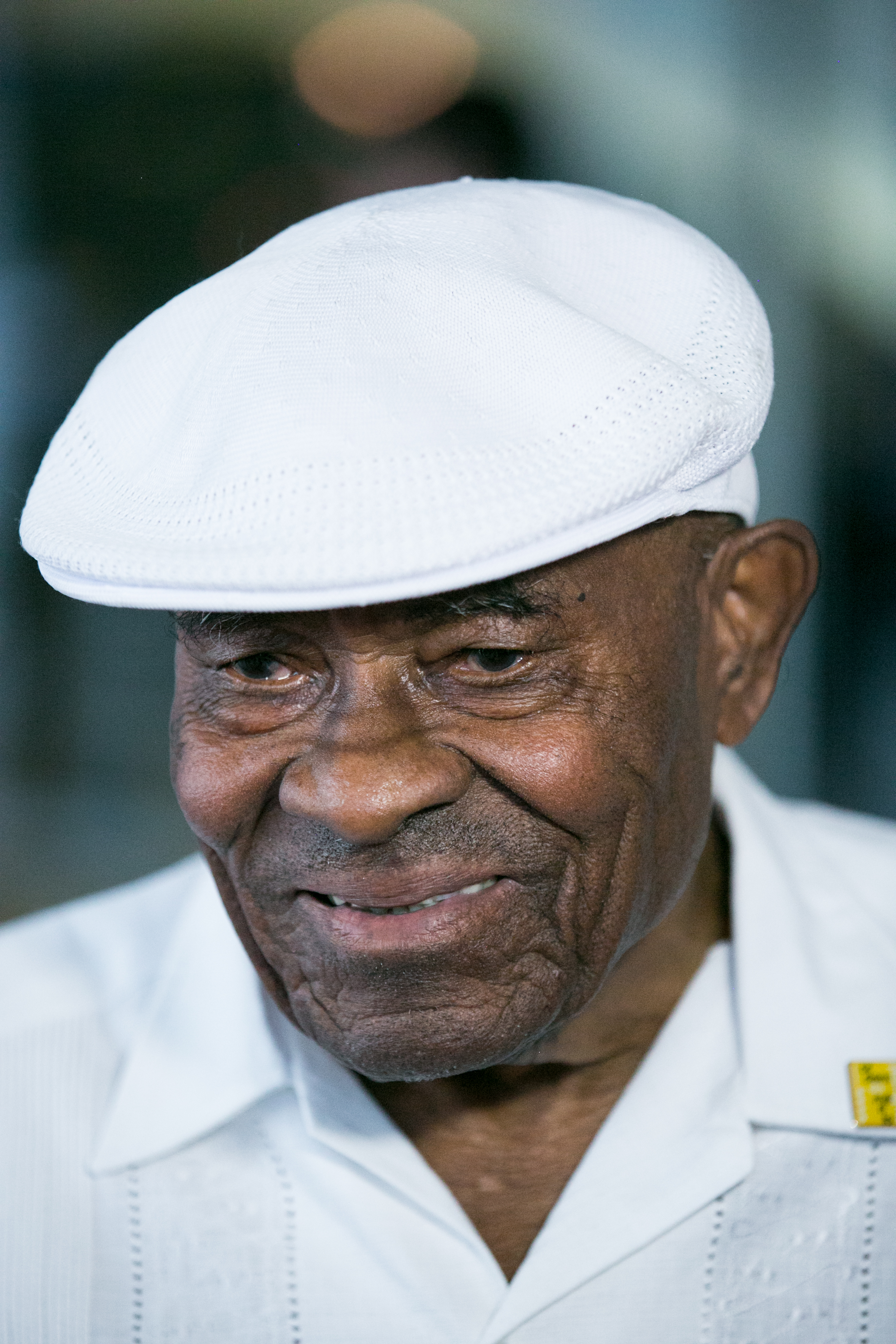
João Grande in 2015

João Oliveira dos Santos (born 15 January 1933), better known as Mestre João Grande, is a Grão-Mestre (Grand Master) of the Afro-Brazilian martial art of capoeira Angola who has helped spread this art worldwide. He was a student of the "father of Angola", Mestre Pastinha, and has an academy in New York City.

== Early years ==
Mestre João Grande was born in the village of Itagi in the south of the Brazilian state of Bahia. As a child he worked alongside his family in the fields. At the age of 10, he saw "corta capim" for the first time. This is a movement performed by crouching down, extending one leg in front and swinging it around in a circle, hopping over it with the other leg. Fascinated, he asked what it was called and was told that it was "the Dance of the Nagos" — a dance of the African descendants in the city of Salvador. The Yoruba of Southwest Nigeria had a major cultural influence in Salvador, which was considered the Black Rome of Brazil. But the dance was actually of Central African origin— it was Capoeira. João didn't learn the correct name of the movement until many years later, but it changed his life forever. At the age of ten, he left home in search of "the Dance of the Nagos".

== Meeting of Mestres ==
Ten years later, he ended up in Salvador Brazil, the birthplace of capoeira as we know it, where he saw a proper capoeira roda for the first time. Present were mestres Menino Gordo, João Pequeno, who was there with his first teacher, Mestre Barbosa, and Cobrinha Verde, one of the most skillful players of that era.

== Student of Pastinha ==
João Grande asked Mestre Barbosa if he could study, and Mestre Barbosa sent him to João Pequeno, who later became his closest associate in capoeira. João Pequeno sent him to Mestre Pastinha, who had a famous academy in the Cardeal Pequeno neighborhood of Brotas. João Grande requested permission to join his academy, and Pastinha accepted João as a student at the age of twenty, relatively late in capoeira life. It was Pastinha who gave him the name of João Grande (Big John). While studying, João Grande worked as a longshoreman, playing after work or on his few days off.

== Early fame ==
Mestre João Grande eventually became such an acclaimed capoeirista that when Carybé, a painter famous for his documentation of African Culture in Bahia, chose to do studies of capoeira, he chose João Grande as a model.

João Grande and João Pequeno are featured in numerous films of capoeira, including one in which they demonstrate the knife techniques of the art. In 1966, João Grande travelled to Senegal with Mestre Pastinha to demonstrate capoeira at the first World Festival of Black Arts in Dakar. He was awarded his Diploma of capoeira from Pastinha in 1968 making him a full-fledged master of capoeira Angola. He subsequently toured Europe and the Middle East with Viva Bahia, a pioneering group that performed Afro-Brazilian folk arts such as capoeira, samba, maculelê, candomblé and puxada da rede.

== Demise of Mestre Pastinha ==
Eventually, Pastinha's academy fell on hard times. Pastinha was asked by the government to vacate his building for renovations, but the space was never returned to him. Instead, it became a restaurant with entertainment, now called SENAC. Pastinha died broke and bitter about his treatment, but never regretted living the life of a capoeirista.

== Return to Capoeira ==
João Grande returned when Mestre Moraes and Mestre Cobra Mansa persuaded him to come out of retirement in the mid-1980s. He began to teach with their organization Grupo Capoeira Angola Pelourinho. In 1989, he was invited by Jelon Vieira to tour the United States. The tour was a tremendous success. In 1990, he returned to present capoeira at the National Black Arts Festival in Atlanta, Georgia and at the Schomberg Center for Research for Black Culture in New York City. João Grande decided he liked the US and has been teaching at his own academy in New York City ever since.

== Present day ==
In 1995, he received a Doctorate of Humane Letters from Upsala College, East Orange, New Jersey. He is a recipient of a 2001 National Heritage Fellowship awarded by the National Endowment for the Arts, which is the United States government's highest honor in the folk and traditional arts. He has also recorded an audio CD and several DVDs featuring himself and his students, as well as other illustrious figures of capoeira Angola.

== See also ==
- Capoeira
- Mestre Pastinha
- João Pequeno
- The "lineage" of capoeira Angola mestres under Mestre Pastinha
