= João Pequeno =

Brazilian capoeira master (1917–2011)

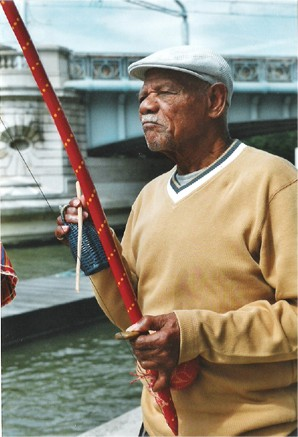
Mestre João Pequeno de Pastinha

João Pereira dos Santos (27 December 1917 – 9 December 2011), known as Mestre João Pequeno was capoeira Angola mestre and one of the principal students of mestre Pastinha.

He began his career in Capoeira as a student of Mestre Gilvenson and later became a disciple of Mestre Pastinha - the father of contemporary Capoeira Angola. Together with Mestre João Grande he is later to share the honour of being one of the late Mestre Pastinha's two most learned students - the ones to whom he entrusted his legacy. Mestre João Pequeno died on 9 December 2011 at the age of 93.

In 1970, Mestre Pastinha said the following about João Pequeno, "He will be the greatest Capoeira players of the future and I have worked hard with him, and for him, to achieve this. He will be a true master. Not just impromptu teacher, as can be found anywhere, who only destroy our tradition which is so beautiful. I've taught everything I know to this young man. Even the Cat's Leap (lit. Pulo do gato, the one move that is kept to oneself to use in dire circumstances. It is usually never taught to anyone, to keep its element of surprise). That's why I have the greatest hopes regarding their future."

== The recession of 1973 ==
During the recession of the late 70s (See Oil Crisis of 1973), Capoeira Mestres and dedicated practitioners amongst the populace faced great hardships to continue the practice of their beloved art. Many of them died poor and hungry. Those who were able to, chose to migrate to other countries in search of greener pastures. Many Capoeira schools couldn't survive. However the most significant loss of the time, was to be the closing down of Pastinha's Capoeira academy (Centro Esportivo de Capoeira Angola) and his death in 1981.

The impact of Pastinha's death was far reaching and even João Grande chose to stop playing Capoeira for a time (See Mestre João Grande). Despite these events, João Pequeno persevered these difficult years, biding his time to revive Pastinha's school.

== Revival of Pastinha's academy ==
On 2 May 1982, with the world barely starting to recover from the recession, João Pequeno founded the Academia de João Pequeno de Pastinha with the purpose of continuing the lineage teaching of Capoeira Angola in the manner it was taught in Mestre Pastinha's academy. This lineage was very nearly destroyed when Pastinha's academy was closed down by the government to "renovate" the buildings. The subsequent death almost a decade later of the great Angoleiro only made things more difficult. (See Mestre Pastinha).

The authenticity of João Pequeno's academy in following Pastinha's academy was not limited exclusively to the technique and teaching methods, but also in the manner of spiritual and cultural development. In a way, João Pequeno revived and succeeded in achieving the original purpose for which Pastinha's Centro Esportivo de Capoeira Angola was established - that is, to preserve and promote the traditions of Capoeira Angola, the fundamental tenets of the Angoleiro and to provide a community based support for Capoeiristas.

His old friend and Capoeira brother, João Grande later did the same by establishing his academy in New York City the United States in 1990.

Lineage

Pastinha → João Pequeno

== Later life and death ==
Mestre João Pequeno dedicated his life to teaching Pastinha's style of Capoeira Angola ever since and has graduated students who today are well-known Mestres in their own right. Into his 90s, Joao Pequeno continued to teach and practise capoeira at his academy in Forte de Santo Antônio Além do Carmo which has, through the work of Mestre João and GCAP, come to be called the Forte da Capoeira which is off to the north side of the historical center of Salvador, Bahia which is also called Pelourinho. Mestre João Pequeno died on 9 December 2011, at the age of 93.

== See also ==
- Capoeira
- Mestre Pastinha
- Mestre João Grande
- Mestre Pé de Chumbo
