= Cobra Mansa =

Brazilian capoeira practitioner

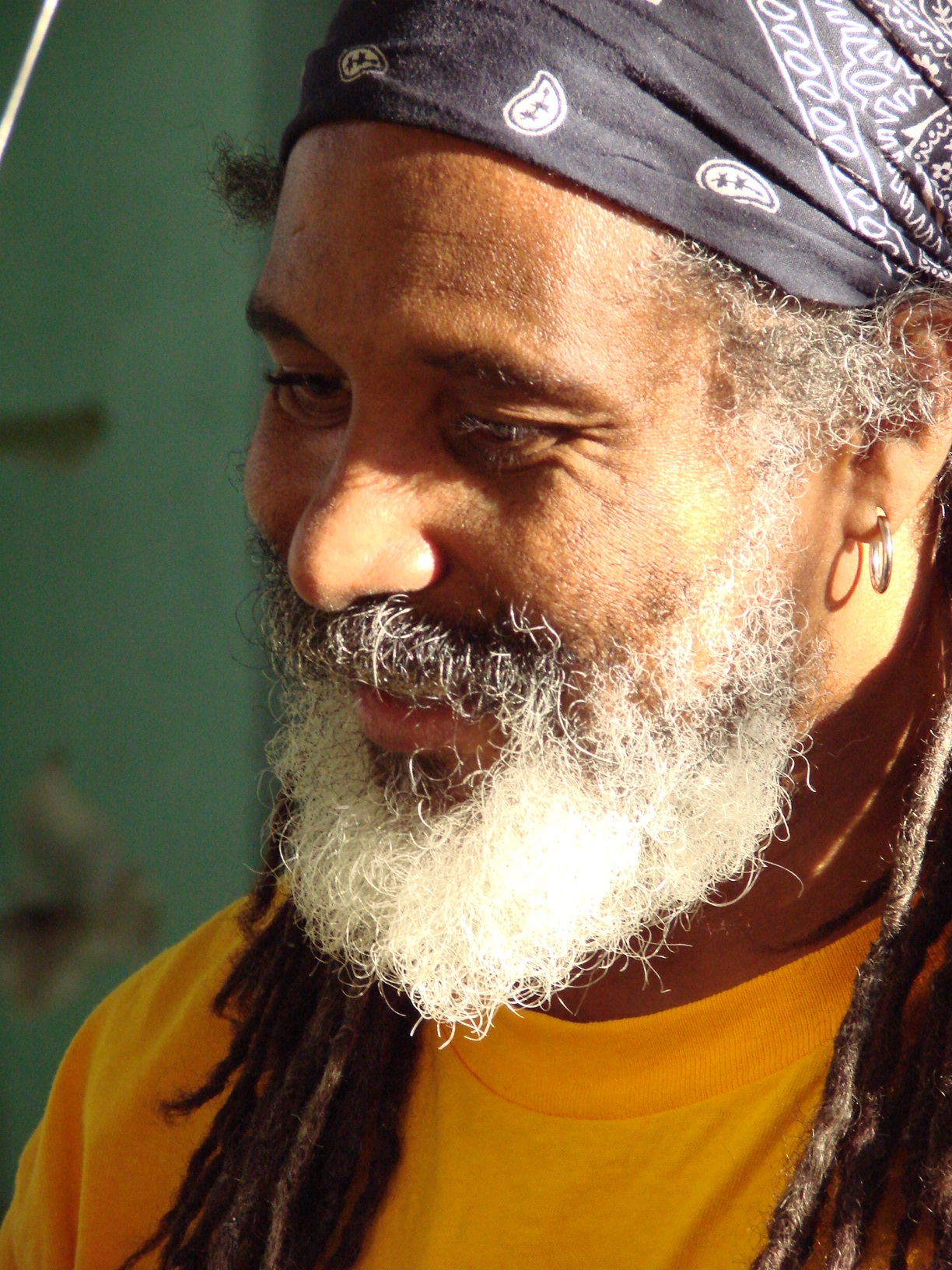
Mestre Cobra Mansa

Mestre Cobra Mansa (born Cinézio Feliciano Peçanha, 1960 in Duque de Caxias, Brazil) also known as Cobrinha and Cobrinha Mansa, is a mestre of capoeira Angola.

He co-founded the International Capoeira Angola Foundation, which maintains 11 affiliated groups in the United States, Brazil and Europe. Currently, he is the mestre of the Makonda Capoeira Group.

Beside his play, Cobra Mansa is known for his knowledge and scholarship of the historical and cultural roots of capoeira.

== Biography ==
He began his practice of capoeira in 1973 with Josias da Silva and Raimundo in the deprived Rio suburb of Duque de Caxias. He played Capoeira in the Duque Caxias street rodas and was one of the founders of the Caxias Street Roda with Rogerio Russo and Peixinho de Caxias.

In 1974, Cobra Mansa became a student of Mestre Moraes, after saw him play in the roda of Central Brazil. Prior to dedicating his life to capoeira Angola, he worked in photography, as a busker, as a street vendor in a circus (Circo Picolino), and even served as a police officer for 2 years in the state of Belo Horizonte.

=== Grupo de Capoeira Angola Pelourinho (GCAP) ===
In 1981, Mansa started with the Grupo Capoeira Angola Pelourinho (GCAP), aimed towards children and orphans with rough backgrounds in Salvador, Bahia. After years of fruitful collaboration, Cobrinha and Moraes had a difference of opinion over the direction of the school where they were both leading figures. The result was the departure of Mestre Cobrinha and several other members of GCAP, as well as the formation of FICA.

=== Life in the United States ===
Around 1994, on invitation from the Ausar Auset Society, Cobrinha moved to the United States and opened a school in Washington, D.C., which was solely dedicated to the teaching of Capoeira Angola. He later became an adjunct professor at George Washington University, and then eventually president of the newly formed FICA.

=== Return to Bahia ===
In 2004, he left the United States to make his home in Bahia, Salvador, Brazil to create the Kilombo Tenondé. This organization is currently split over two sites, one in Valença, Bahia. Kilombo Tenondé provides space for capoeira and permaculture (organic farming). The other site is a cultural center at Coutos in the suburb of Salvador.

=== Trip to Africa ===
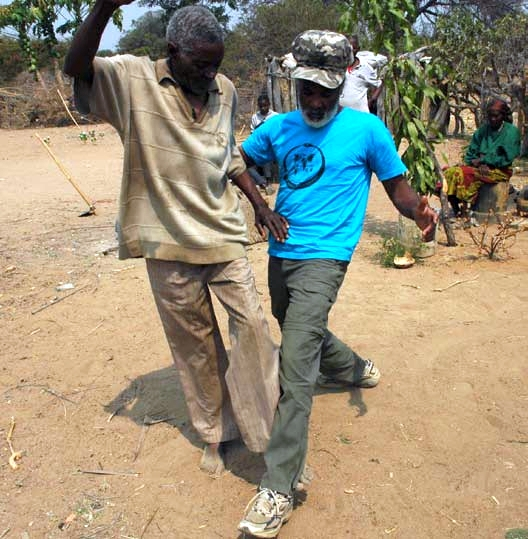
Engolo player Angelino Tchimbundo demonstrates sweeping kick on Mestre Cobra Mansa, Angola, 2011.

In the 2010s, completed a journey to the west-central region of Africa to search for the African roots of capoeira. He spent time in Angola and Mozambique learning about the n'golo martial art and other local African cultural traditions that contributed to the development of capoeira. He also conducted a workshop in South Africa where he shared his knowledge and experiences.

As a result of his trip to Angola, the documentary Jogo de Corpo: Capoeira e Ancestralidade (2013) was created.

== Capoeira style ==
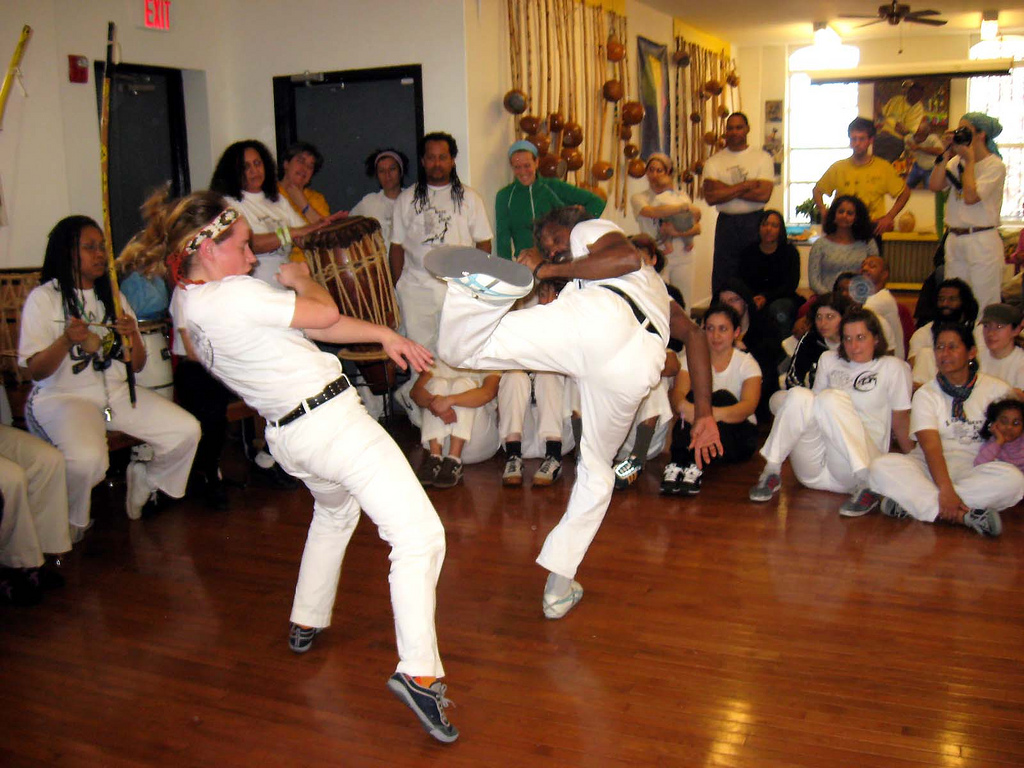
Cobra Mansa plays in roda.

Mestre Cobrinha is known for his dynamic and acrobatic style of play. His nicknames (Cobra Mansa - "tamed snake" and Cobrinha - "little snake") are descriptions derived from Cobra Mansa's graceful and deceptive style. His ability to transform situations through the use of innovative and acrobatic solutions has made him one of the most influential angoleiro (practitioner of capoeira Angola) of his generation.

He has traveled in many non-Angolan circles and tried to help mend old disagreements between the two. His style is respected through both the capoeira Angola and capoeira Regional communities.
