= Roda (formation) =

African and Afro-Brazilian circular dance formation

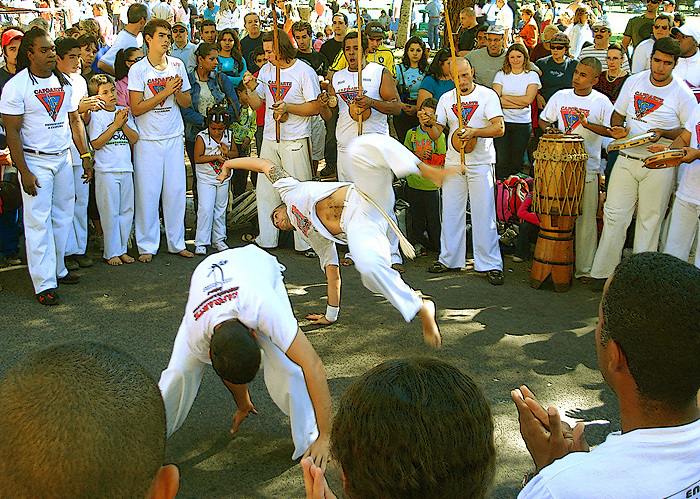
A capoeira roda in Farroupilha Park, Porto Alegre, Brazil (2007)

Roda (Portuguese pronunciation: [ˈʁɔdɐ] - wheel or circle) is the circular formation within which participants perform diverse African and Afro-Brazilian dance and music. Common examples of these art forms are capoeira (including maculelê), engolo, and samba in the subgenres de roda and pagode. By extension, the participants may refer to events featuring those performances as a roda, as in "We will have a roda next Saturday." Sometimes, the name of the art can follow the name of the roda event, such as in "Last week's roda de samba was fun!"

Part of the etiquette of the roda means that the people in it should try to keep the roda circular and fill in any "gaps" that may appear if someone leaves the formation; in other words, the people should be evenly distributed in the circumference of the roda, especially if there are not many people in it. Another important etiquette is giving energy to the people performing, since making all participants feel included, by clapping, singing, performing, and supporting each other, is essential in the community-building that a roda allows.

== Capoeira circle ==
Capoeira circle
- UNESCO Intangible Cultural Heritage
- Country: Brazil
- Reference: 00892
- Region: Latin America and the Caribbean

Inscription history
- Inscription: 2014 (9th session)
- List: Representative

Roda is extremely important for capoeira, a Brazilian martial arts and dance form, because it is the main formation of this martial art and shows spectators the full involvement of the participants and musicians, as well as the shared knowledge between them. It is a way of showcasing the capoeira community with each member complementing each other and understanding, by observing roda members, how they can also add to their own capoeira practice in the process, a constant learning experience.

In the circular formation of capoeira, roles are interchangeable: spectators can become participants, participants can become musicians, and musicians can become spectators, to name a few variations of roles. The soloist Mestre de Capoeira leads, with observers responding collectively, and roles shift throughout the game—a tradition found in Bantu and Yoruba ethnic groups.

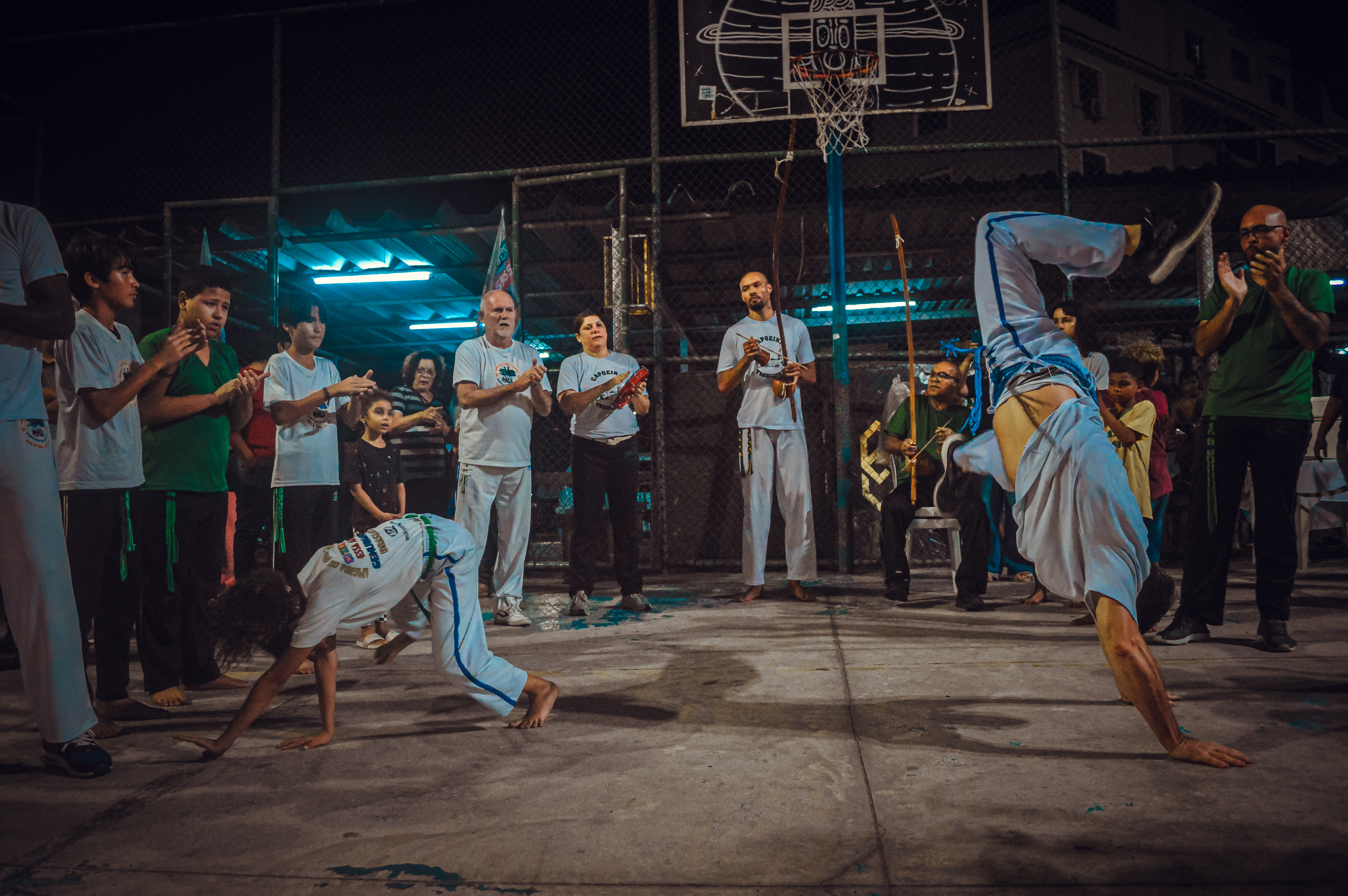
Roda de Capoeira - Capoeira Circle

The people who form the roda will take turns to perform inside the circle. Some of the people in the roda may be mere spectators, in the sense that they will not go inside the circle, but they are expected to contribute to the roda by at least clapping and singing. This can be compared to other art forms, such as tap dancing, where participants will form a circle and take turns performing inside the circle.

True learning in capoeira takes place within the player interaction during the roda, rather than in structured instruction sessions.

In the roda, participants learn not only moves and kicks but also strategies applicable in the game itself and in the broader "game" of life.

In 2014, the capoeira circle was added to UNESCO's Representative List of the Intangible Cultural Heritage of Humanity. The convention recognized that the "capoeira circle is a place where knowledge and skills are learned by observation and imitation" and that it "promotes social integration and the memory of resistance to historical oppression".

=== Circle as a physical concept ===
One of the most important points of the circle is to create a physical boundary between the external world and the participants, musicians, and spectators of a roda. By creating this boundary, no people outside the circle could join the capoeira game, unless allowed by the capoeiristas. This matters because capoeira started in a context of slavery in Brazil, being practiced by enslaved people mostly in secret and as a way to maintain their African roots through cultural manifestations in dance and music forms, as well as being ready for possible conflicts against the colonizers by practicing a martial art. After abolition in Brazil, capoeira was still practiced in secrecy for decades, since the Brazilian authorities prohibited any form of cultural manifestations related to African culture and Afro-Brazilian culture, including capoeira, samba, and candomblé.

Besides being this physical boundary, there is another important aspect of the physical concept of capoeira, the volta ao mundo (circling the world). In volta ao mundo, the two capoeiristas playing stop the game, and one of them marches around the circle. This happens when one of the capoeiristas playing falls or shows signs of fatigue, being a break from the game, helping to rest before the game is resumed, and allowing the capoeirista performing to better have a chance to demonstrate to the public that they are the one most likely to win the game. In the 1960s, volta ao mundo used to be performed before the beginning of a capoeira game. So, the game had no breaks for resting or recovering, since the volta ao mundo was not used when one of the capoeiristas got tired.

=== Spiritual meanings of the circle ===
The circle has a lot of spiritual meanings brought by the enslaved people to Brazil. In Kongo, for example, the circle represents the universe and reincarnation, as the cycle of life-death-rebirth, called Bakongo cosmology, containing the conception, birth, maturity, and death.

Capoeira au movement

For capoeiristas, the circle enables people to contact their ancestors and traditions, transitioning to other states of consciousness. A common way to represent this connection with ancestors in capoeira is with the au movement, when hands touch the ground and feet go to the air, contacting the ground with ancestors believed to be below the earth. Many capoeiristas report not remembering what happened during a roda, from when they start performing in it, with the au movement, until the roda ends. Also, both Kongo and Yoruba religions share spiritual knowledge related to circles, specifically, with three different circles, all represented in a roda de capoeira. The first circle means the world, the community, or the village, represented by the spectators in a capoeira circle. The second one means people who have ancestral knowledge in them but are still alive, represented by the capoeiristas playing in the circle. Lastly, the third circle represents the spiritual world, shown in capoeira in the interaction between all roda members: players, musicians, and spectators.

=== Maculelê ===
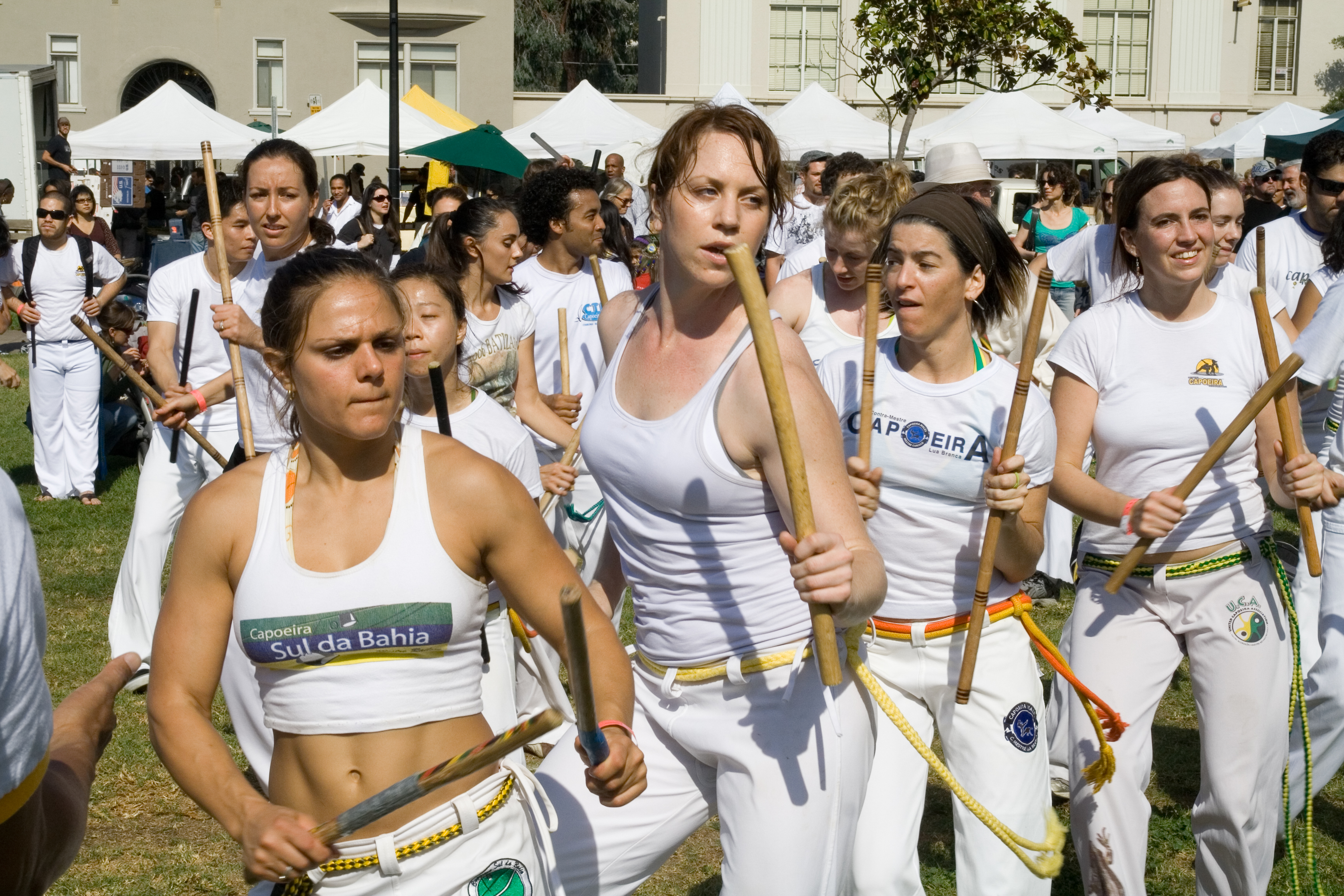
Capoeiristas preparing to start maculelê

Maculelê is a form of martial art and dance, considered part of capoeira, like a sub-genre, and almost exclusively performed in rodas de capoeira. It originated in Santo Amaro and is known for the use of sticks as both musical instruments and weapons. Famous mestres (masters) de capoeira, such as Mestre Bimba and Mestre Pastinha, started including maculelê in their own exhibitions and rodas, becoming present in many capoeira schools nowadays.

The most famous implementations of maculelê in the circular formation of capoeira are the implementation of some steps using sticks as a type of warming-up exercise. In some rodas de capoeira, maculelê can also be included in an actual capoeira performance as an additional resource or as a special kind of game between the participants.

== Engolo circle ==
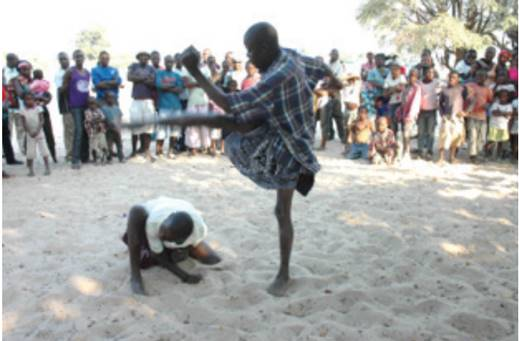
Engolo circle in Angola, 2010.

Within the Bantu culture, in modern-day Angola, the circle carries profound symbolism. Village dwellings are frequently arranged in circular formations, and communal meals are enjoyed while seated in a circle. Dancing in a circle holds significance, representing protection and strength, symbolizing the bond with the spirit world, life, and the divine.

The practice of engolo, as documented by Neves e Sousa in the 1950s, involves a circle of singing participants and potential combatants. Sometimes, this circle is overseen by a kimbanda, a ritual specialist. The game starts with clapping and call-and-response songs, some of them featuring humming instead of lyrics. A practitioner enters the circle, dancing and shouting, and when another participant joins, they engage in a dance-off, assessing each other's skills. This interaction incorporates kicks and sweeps, with defenders using dodges and blending techniques to counterattack smoothly. This cycle continues until one participant concedes defeat, feels the match is complete, or the kimbanda overseeing the match calls for its conclusion.

In engolo games documented in the 2010s, players often initiate the engolo circle by challenging others. In such cases, they enthusiastically leap into the circle, showcasing agile movements and occasional shouts while awaiting someone to join and engage in the play. They can also select a specific individual to join them by using kicks or simulated kicks.

== Samba Circle ==
There are two main types of samba known as being performed in a roda: the samba de roda, from Recôncavo Baiano, and the roda de samba, from Rio de Janeiro. There are a few differences in those two styles, a consequence of the different ways samba developed in those two places. The most significant one is the nomenclature used for the people who perform samba, known as sambistas in Rio de Janeiro and called sambadeiros and sambadeiras in Recôncavo Baiano. Academics often use these different nomenclatures as a way for the readers to identify which samba they are talking about. There is also a subgenre of samba performed in the roda formation, the pagode.

When samba is performed in a roda, it is intrinsically connected to the desire of the samba dancers and musicians to express their pride in their own cultural traditions, usually related to African roots, and benefit emotionally, physically, and spiritually from the practice of a roda.

=== Samba de Roda - Recôncavo Baiano ===
Samba de Roda of the Recôncavo of Bahia
- UNESCO Intangible Cultural Heritage
- Country: Brazil
- Reference: 00101
- Region: Latin America and the Caribbean

Inscription history
- Inscription: 2008 (3rd session)
- List: Representative

Recôncavo Baiano is known as a place that unites all cultures of enslaved African people. Due to the transatlantic slave trade, people from different nations of Africa came to Brazil in the same time period, bringing with them diverse cultural practices from their regions. It was in Recôncavo Baiano that these practices were recreated, and culture was shared among enslaved people. The samba de roda from Recôncavo Baiano was originally proclaimed as UNESCO Intangible Cultural Heritage in November 2005. In 2008, samba de roda was officially inscribed on UNESCO's Representative List of the Intangible Cultural Heritage of Humanity.

In the Samba de Roda, the circular formation is important to practice values of community and belonging, practiced in Recôncavo Baiano since the colonial period by Afro-Brazilians and Africans. Even though samba de roda is not entirely African, with

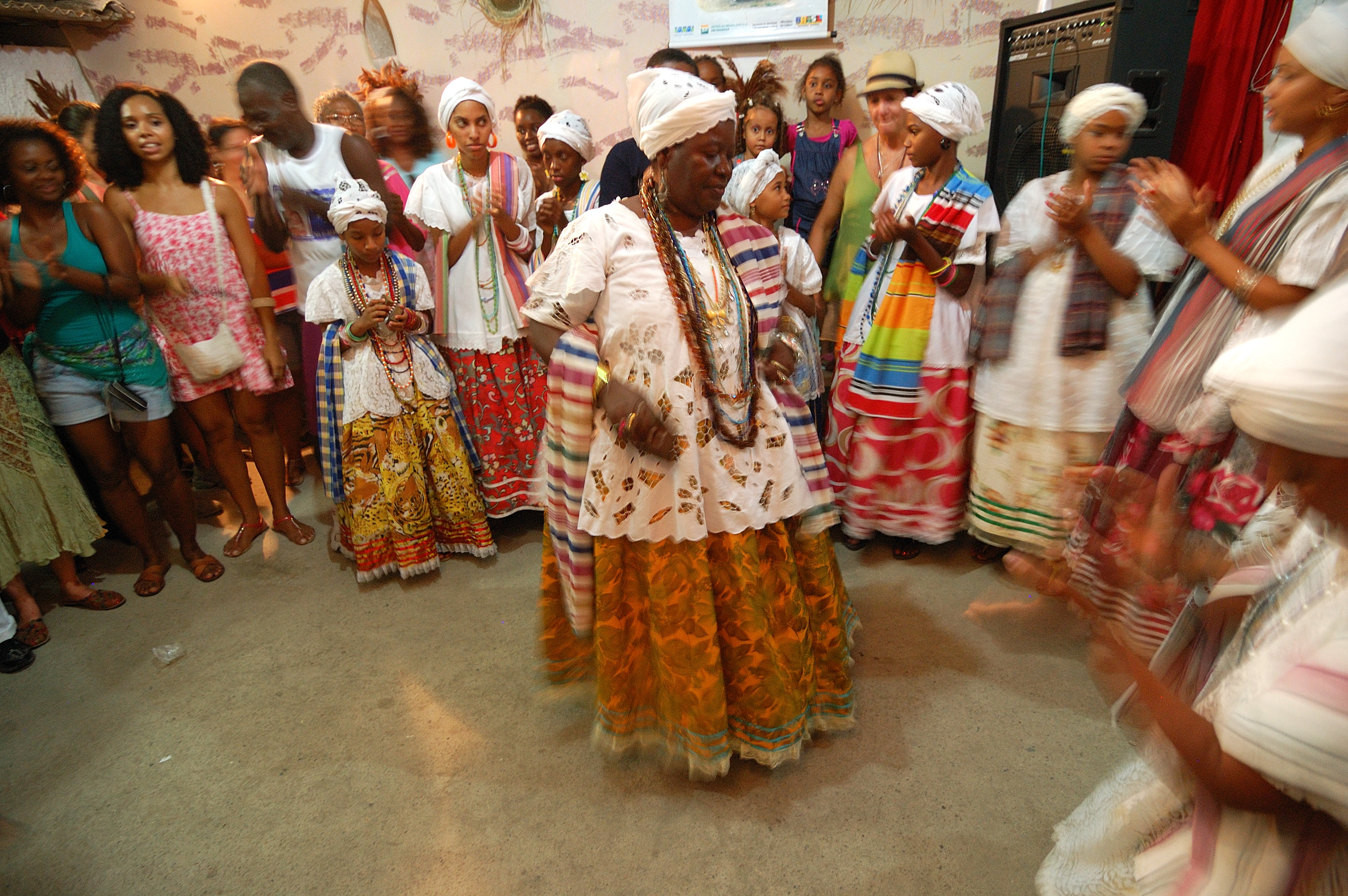
Samba de Roda in Recôncavo Baiano

cultural elements from Portuguese and Indigenous cultures, the roda songs usually focus on the daily lives of Afro-Brazilians, as a way for them to find the values mentioned above of community and belonging.

The roda had gender roles that value the importance of both men and women participating. It is common that men will play the instruments and the women will dance samba. Without songs, there is no samba. With no samba, there is no roda. Another important role of samba de roda is connected with two religions: Catholicism and Candomblé. Both religions, sometimes practiced together by roda members in religious syncretism, have important spiritual celebrations and festivals that include samba de roda. Some examples include samba de roda in the catholic festival of Nossa Senhora da Boa Morte, in the city of Cachoeira, and as a way to end the candomblé terreiro festival of the Nagô (Ketu) nation.

=== Roda de Samba - Rio de Janeiro ===
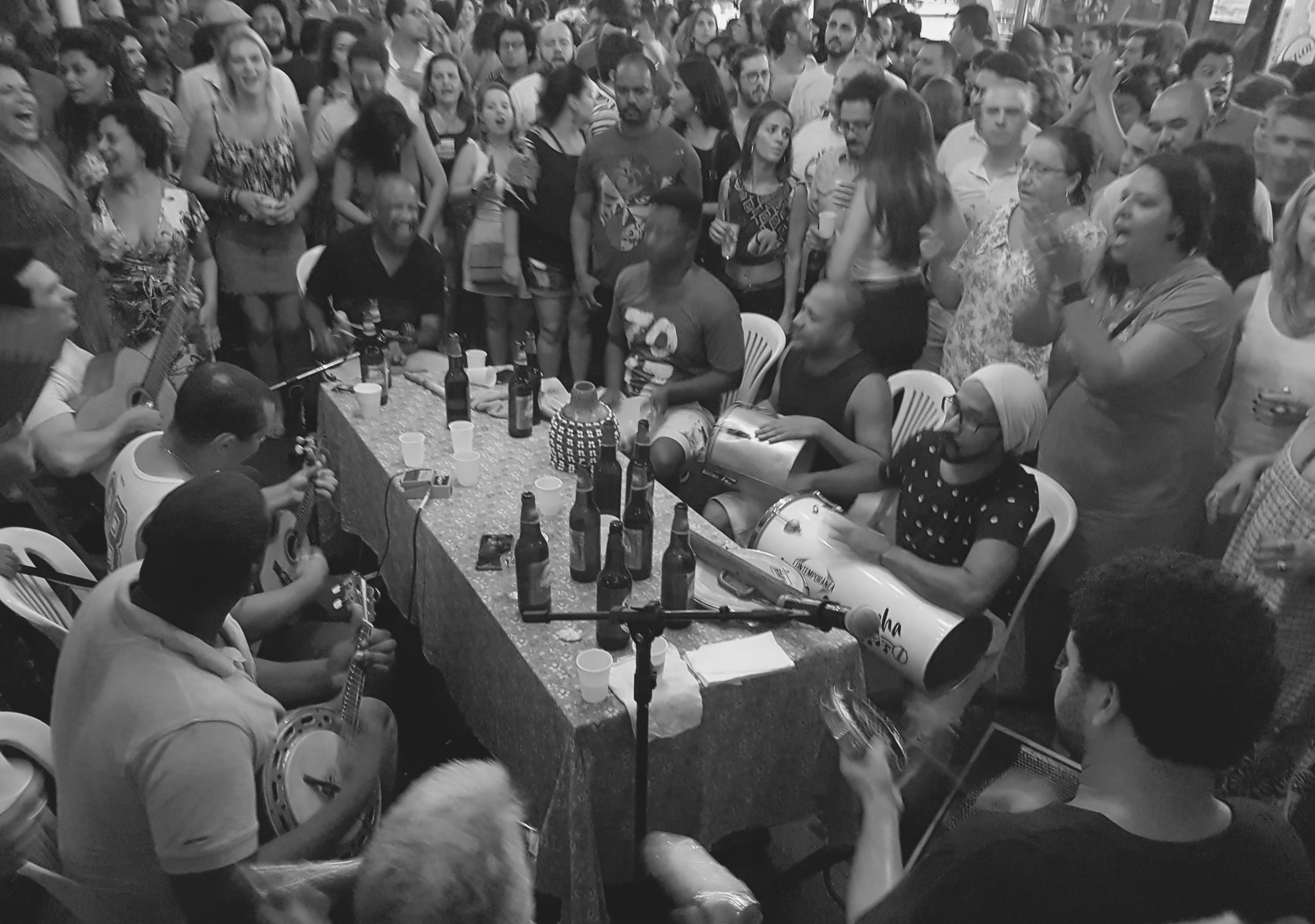
Roda de Samba in Rio de Janeiro

In the 20th Century, while samba started being commercialized and institutionalized in Rio de Janeiro, many sambistas felt like they were losing some of the essence of samba in the process, especially in relation to the cultural heritage of this dance and music form. As a way to find a place where samba was preserved without being commercialized, they started to dance and play samba in the roda. It was a way to celebrate in community with the samba that those sambistas learned and grew up practicing, with a sense of home found in the roda due to its community-building.

The formation of samba in a roda creates a space that allows a constant interaction between the sambistas and the spectators. Many times, as well as in capoeira, spectators would become dancers or musicians. This type of formation allowed relationships to be built between sambistas and the public, with a sense of belonging for both groups. The roda could constantly be organized around a table or in the kitchen of someone's house, uniting friends and family to have fun and feel at home, even if the house was not theirs.

The roda de samba can be comprehended, then, as a place in which spectators, dancers, and musicians co-exist at the same time and mutually contribute to the experience. In this context, the roda de samba is characterized by Grillo (2021) as a ritual, due to its connections of social experience in a deep development of mind, body, and spirit with social and political meanings behind the performance, deeply connected to the origins of samba, the commercialization of this genre, and the cultural roots of samba in Africa.

=== Pagode ===
With the commercialization of samba, many musicians were worried about the loss of African roots in this dance and music style. Pagode emerged in the 1970s and 1980s as a response to the escolas de samba (samba schools) commercialization, creating a new subgenre of samba that blends samba elements with modern sounds. With an innovative sound, pagode became popular for Brazilians from all socioeconomic classes, especially for middle-class Brazilians, while reclaiming the Afro-Brazilian history and culture present in samba.

Roda is already present in pagode because of the surprising word it derived from: pagoda, a type of tower common in Asian Buddhist temples, related to the Noble Eightfold Path. This connection exists because it is common to walk around a pagoda in circles with other people, forming a similar formation as in the roda de pagode. The similarities of pagode with Buddhism end there, since the context in which pagode was created, in Brazilian favelas, and persecuted by authorities, is much more connected to Brazilian history and culture.

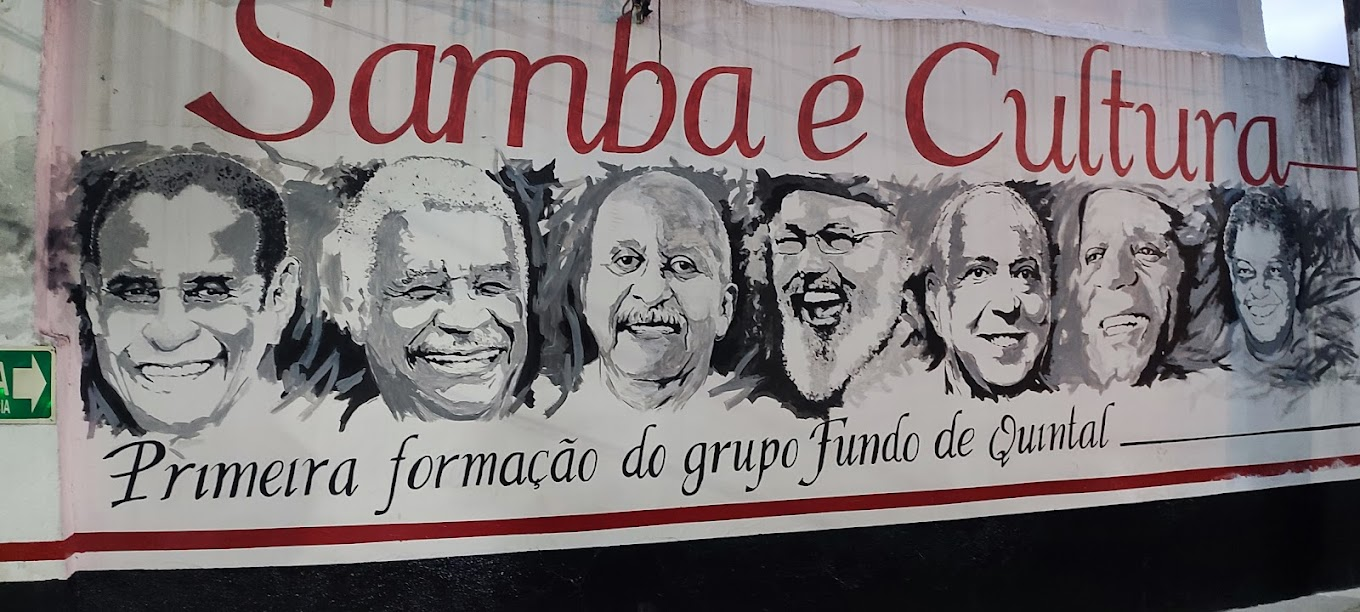
Cacique de Ramos mural honoring the formation of Pagode by Grupo Fundo de Quintal

Pagode started in the backyard of samba musicians, around a large table. There, people from some blocos de carnaval would eat, drink, and play samba with new differences that originated in pagode. The roda would happen around the table, as an informal way to play music, sing, and dance with friends and family. As in any roda, everyone would be expected to contribute with at least singing and clapping. An example is the bloco de carnaval Cacique de Ramos, which would take a break after rehearsing in one of the bloco members' houses every Wednesday evening. There, the first pagode group was created: Grupo Fundo de Quintal.

== Literature ==
- Assunção, Matthias Röhrig (2002). Capoeira: The History of an Afro-Brazilian Martial Art. Routledge. ISBN 978-0-7146-8086-6.
- Capoeira, Nestor (2002). Capoeira: Roots of the Dance-Fight-Game. Blue Snake Books. ISBN 978-1-58394-637-4.
- Capoeira, Nestor (2007). The Little Capoeira Book. Blue Snake Books. ISBN 9781583941980.
- Talmon-Chvaicer, Maya (2008). The Hidden History of Capoeira: A Collision of Cultures in the Brazilian Battle Dance. University of Texas Press. ISBN 978-0-292-71723-7.

== See also ==
- Capoeira
