= Capoeira: The History of an Afro-Brazilian Martial Art =

2005 book by Matthias Röhrig Assunção

- Author: Matthias Röhrig Assunção

Capoeira: The History of an Afro-Brazilian Martial Art is a book by Matthias Röhrig Assunção published by Routledge in 2005. The book is known for its insight into the far-reaching history of the Brazilian martial art known as Capoeira, and its complex cultural significance to Brazilian identity. It provides a series of in-depth debates on Capoeira, including what it actually is (a fight, sport, dance, or art), where its true origins lie (African, Afro-Brazilian, or Brazilian), and what it exemplifies (resistance, or acceptance). Additionally, it describes the evolution of Capoeira from its roots as it spread to different regions of Brazil in the 19th and 20th Centuries, and the rest of the world in the 21st Century, accepting a multitude of beliefs into a single divers culture. Throughout the book, Capoeira is also seen as a mechanism for racial desegregation.

== Synopsis ==
To give a background of Capoeira, the book first discusses the arguments behind each of its three possible origins, which were of either African, Afro-Brazilian (slave), or Brazilian (Native American) descent. In this first section of the first chapter, myths are used as evidence for each possible origin. However, Assunção refuses to accept these myths as a proper method to locate Capoeira's origination because there is no factual evidence behind them. Instead, with the use of paintings, and primary, as well as secondary quotations he arrives at an African origination. Assunção's key theme throughout the book was the alteration of Capoeira as it spread, and engulfed new races and cultures. However, he reframes from acknowledging this process as a separation from Capoeira's origins, but rather a modernization of it, as it branched out to new regions. Almost every topic throughout the book connects back to this theme of modernization. When offering Capoeira as a form of National identity in Brazil he talks about colonial Brazil, (late 19th century - to early 20th century) when social status was determined by skin color. At this point in time, Brazil struggled to find a source of national identity due to racial segregation, and Capoeira remained popular only in the black lower class. Eventually, war and white immigration became mechanisms for the inter-mixing of social classes, allowing for the infiltration of Capoeira into the middle and upper classes. As it grew in popularity among multiple races, it grew away from its origins but embraced Brazil's multi-racial culture, providing Brazil with a game or ritual they could all take part in. Assunção describes how this provided an influx of national pride and identity within Brazil. One issue within the book was giving Capoeira a definition. This proved to be difficult, due to its alterations over time. Assunção explains how originally, it was seen as a tool to fight authority with by slaves or freed slaves that were still repressed by the lighter skinned community. The spread of Capoeira caused modernized forms to break off as a playful dance. The Globalization of it in the 21st century, caused additional forms to break off as a sport, or performance. However, older forms were continually practiced by traditional folk, creating several true definitions of Capoeira. Another debate Assunção struggled with is whether Capoeira is representative of resistance (to authority) or acceptance (to modernize). Assunção illustrates that the diversity of Capoeira makes it difficult to be represented by one or the other, and that societal, and political forces add to the debates complexity as well. Additionally, this connects to another focus of Assunção, which is Capoeira's ability to act as an instrument for racial desegregation. Though there are several instances of racial mixing due to Capoeira throughout the text, the infiltration of white Portuguese servants into the Capoeira community resulted in its multi-racial use for resistance against authority. “Whites and blacks in the roda hug each other like brothers” (pg.209). The Roda is the confrontational dance or fight using Capoeira technique.

== Critical reception ==
Capoeira: the history of an Afro-Brazilian Martial Art has received little criticism since its publication in 2005. In his review of the book, Bryan McCann gives much praise to the book, and declares it as the best text to date on the history of Capoeira “by a wide margin.” He explains his approval of Assunção's ability to dive deeper into the cross-cultural complexities of Capoeira to uncover more appropriate conclusions. Furthermore, McCann puts the chapters on the two Mestres (Bimba, and Pastinha) in high regards by describing them as “fascinating” Additionally, in another review by Robert N. Anderson, the book is also viewed in a positive manner by similarly proclaiming the book to be unmatched by any related texts. Anderson also makes claims about Assunção's position as a historian and how that affected his reliance on physical evidence as opposed to the myths in his argument on the origin of Capoeira. This is not a criticism, but rather an interesting connection behind the arguments made in the book. Anderson ends his review on a fairly sour note, stating the book's incorporation of foreign terms within the English literature was inadequate, concluding that the book was “readable”.

Review by Bryan McCann in the American Historical Review 111 (2006): 1235-1235.

Review by Robert N. Anderson in The Americas 63 (2006): 145–146.

Review by Christopher M. Johnson in the Journal of Latin American Studies 40 (2008): 834–836.
