= History of capoeira =

Origins and development of capoeira

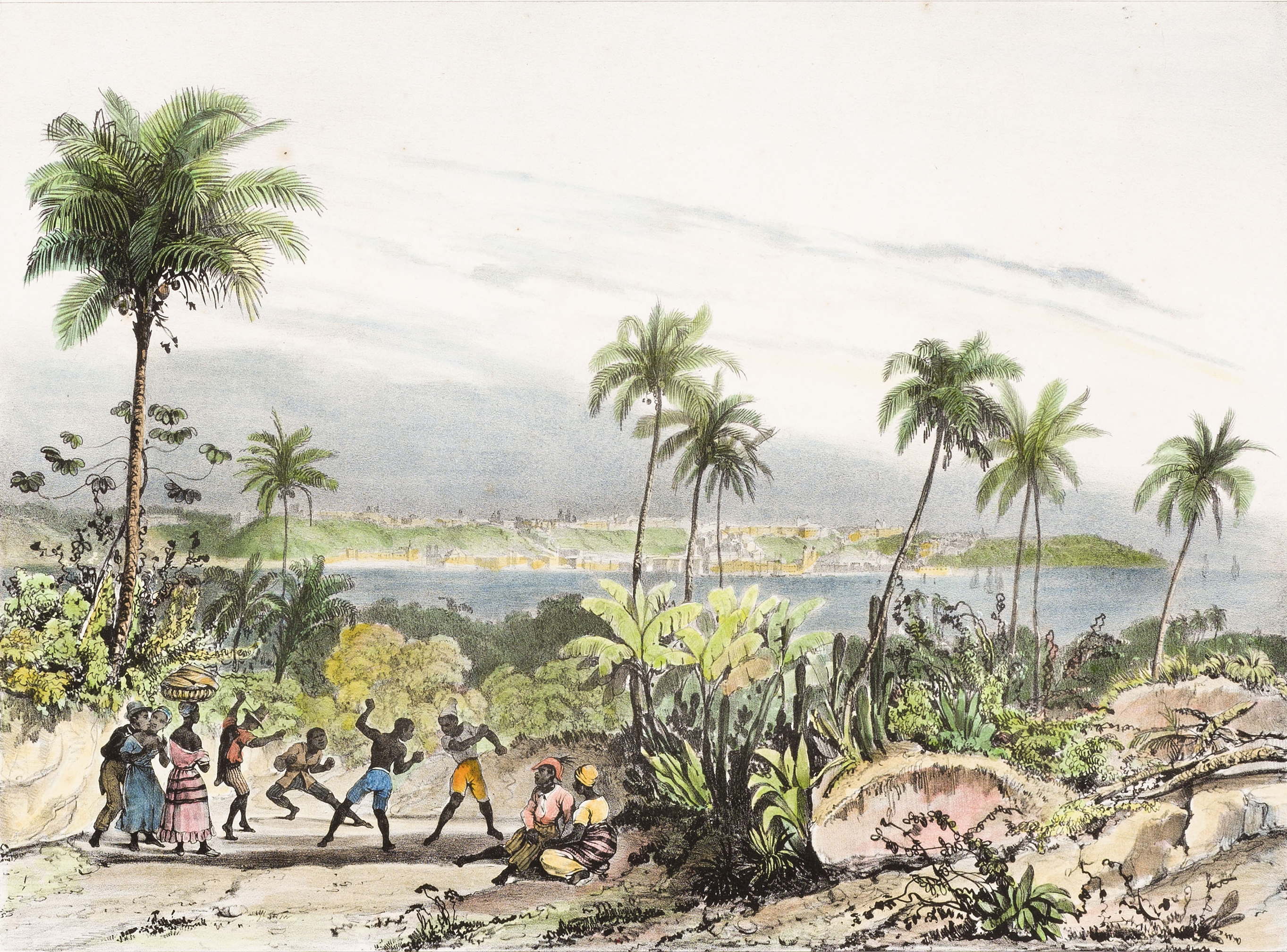
San Salvador, 1835, by Rugendas. "The scene is set in a clearing surrounded by tropical vegetation and palm trees, corresponding precisely to the space called capoeira in Brazil."

The history of capoeira explores the origins and development of capoeira, a Brazilian martial art and game that combines dance, acrobatics, fighting, and music.

Capoeira first appeared among Africans in Brazil, during the early colonial period of the 18th century. There is a substantial debate about whether capoeira was created in its essence in West Africa, or whether it only became fully formed in Brazil. According to the old capoeira mestres and tradition within the community, capoeira originates from Angola, likely from the Mbundu people of the Kingdom of Ndongo. Ndondo was controlled by a formal military, in which Mbundu soldiers were trained professionally for combat. Therefore, these combat abilities would have been brought to Brazil with Mbundu people enslaved in the Atlantic Slave Trade. However, the exact of capoeira is not entirely clear, many studies have supported the oral tradition, identifying engolo as an ancestral art and locating the Cunene region as its birthplace. At the core of capoeira we find techniques developed in engolo, including crescent kicks, push kicks, sweeps, handstands, cartwheels, evasions and even the iconic meia lua de compasso, scorpion kick and L-kick. Some authors believe there were other ancestors and influences besides engolo.

Rio de Janeiro, the epicenter of capoeira in the 18th century, saw the development of an extremely violent style of capoeira carioca associated with gangs or maltas. This style included head-butts, kicking, punching, and knife-fighting, much of which entailed new innovations. That violent version of capoeira is now generally extinct.

In the early 1930s, Mestre Bimba reformed capoeira and developed the capoeira regional style. The government came to see capoeira as a socially acceptable sport. In 1941, Mestre Pastinha later founded his school where he cultivated the traditional capoeira Angola, distinguishing it from Mestre Bimba's reforms and the "national sport" approach. Despite their significant differences, both masters introduced major innovations – they moved training and rodas from the streets indoors, instituted the academia, prescribed uniforms, started to teach women, and presented capoeira to a broader audiences. In the 1970s, capoeira became more broadly accepted across Brazil and exported to the United States and other countries. In the 1980s, there was a revival of interest in its African roots.

== 16th and 17th centuries: Enslavement of Africans in Brazil ==
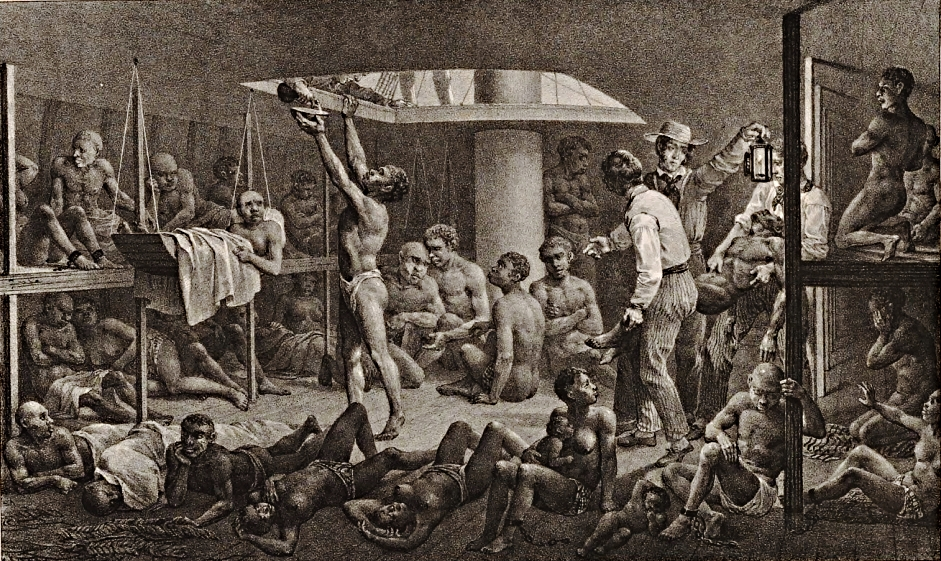
Negros in the cellar of a slave boat, by Johann Moritz Rugendas.

From the 16th century, Portuguese colonists began capturing slaves from Angola and transporting them to Brazil. In 1617, they established a colony in Benguela. In 1627 and 1628, they conducted two significant military campaigns into inland regions. One ventured towards the source of the Kunene River, while the other went to the central territories inhabited by the Kunene people, known for their martial arts. Some enslaved Angolans brought with them their traditional martial art, engolo.

The main economic activity in colonial Brazil was the production of sugar cane. Portuguese colonists created large sugarcane farms called engenhos (engines), employing slave labor. Slaves, living in inhumane conditions, were forced to work hard and often suffered physical punishment for small infractions.

However, escaped slaves began establishing their settlements in remote areas, which they called kilombo, which means "war camp" in the Kimbundu Bantu language. Portuguese sources indicate that it required more than one dragoon to capture a quilombo warrior, as they defended themselves with a "strangely moving fighting technique". The provincial governor declared "it is harder to defeat a quilombo than the Dutch invaders." Some quilombos grew to become independent states, with the largest one, Quilombo dos Palmares, becoming an African kingdom in the Western hemisphere that lasted nearly a century (1605–1694). Quilombos attracted fugitive slaves, Brazilian natives and even Europeans escaping the law. Everyday life in a quilombo offered freedom. Anibal Burlamaqui claimed that capoeira was born in the quilombos of Palmares, out of the need of Africans to defend themselves. However, their warriors fought with weapons, including firearms. Some other sources indicate that this multi-ethnic community, constantly threatened by Portuguese colonial troops, trained capoeira as an effective martial art. However, there is dispute as to whether capoeira or some forebear to it was practiced at Palmares.

== Engolo roots ==
=== Oral tradition ===
Capoeira originated among Africans in Brazil and for a long time was transmitted exclusively within the Black community. There is a long-standing debate on the question of whether capoeira basically originated in West Africa, or whether it was substantively developed and formed by experiences and practices in Brazil.

Capoeira came from Africa brought by the African. We all know this.

— Mestre Noronha

Well, there is one thing that nobody doubts: the ones to teach capoeira to us were the negro slaves that were brought from Angola.

— Mestre Pastinha

Portuguese Angola, known as Portuguese West Africa was the main source of African slaves to Brazil.

As with other Afro-Brazilian traditions, oral communication is the basis of the transmission of knowledge in capoeira. According to the old capoeira mestres and the oral tradition within the community, capoeira originates from Angola. The very name of Capoeira de Angola (Angolan capoeira) emphasizes the origin of the discipline. The older names including jogo de Angola (Angolan game) or brincar de angola (playing angola), also emphasize the Angolan origin. The names of the major capoeira rhythms all relate to Angola (Angola, Benguela, and Sao Bento – the patron saint of Angola), and African references in the songs overwhelmingly refer to Angola. Both the capoeira drum and the musical bow with its style of play are clearly of Angolan provenance. In the 19th century, Pires de Almeida, João do Rio, Manuel Raimundo Querino all state that capoeira was brought from Angola to Rio ("from the lands of Congo"). Mestre Pastinha, who learned capoeira from a teacher born in Angola, often said that the original art came from Angola: "Capoeira undoubtedly came to Brazil with the African slaves. It was a form of battle with unique characteristics that have been preserved to this day."

=== Contemporary research, interpretation, and historical reconstruction ===
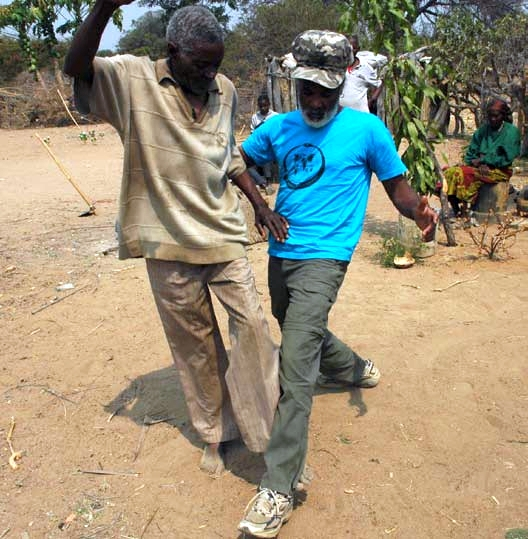
N'golo player Angelino Tchimbundo demonstrates sweep on capoeira mestre Cobra Mansa, Angola, 2011.

It is now well documented that many core capoeira techniques, such as rasteira, rabo de arraia, chapa de frente, chapa de costas, meia lua de frente, scorpion kick, cartwheel kick, and many others, were developed within the African martial art engolo.

In the mid-20th century, the painter Neves e Sousa brought detailed drawings of the n'golo from Angola to Brazil, showing that there is an art similar to capoeira in Angola. Ever since, many studies have supported the oral tradition, identifying engolo as an ancestral art and locating the Cunene region as its birthplace. No known martial art in the world shares a more common technical base of kicks with capoeira than engolo.

== 18th century: Spread of capoeira to cities and repression ==
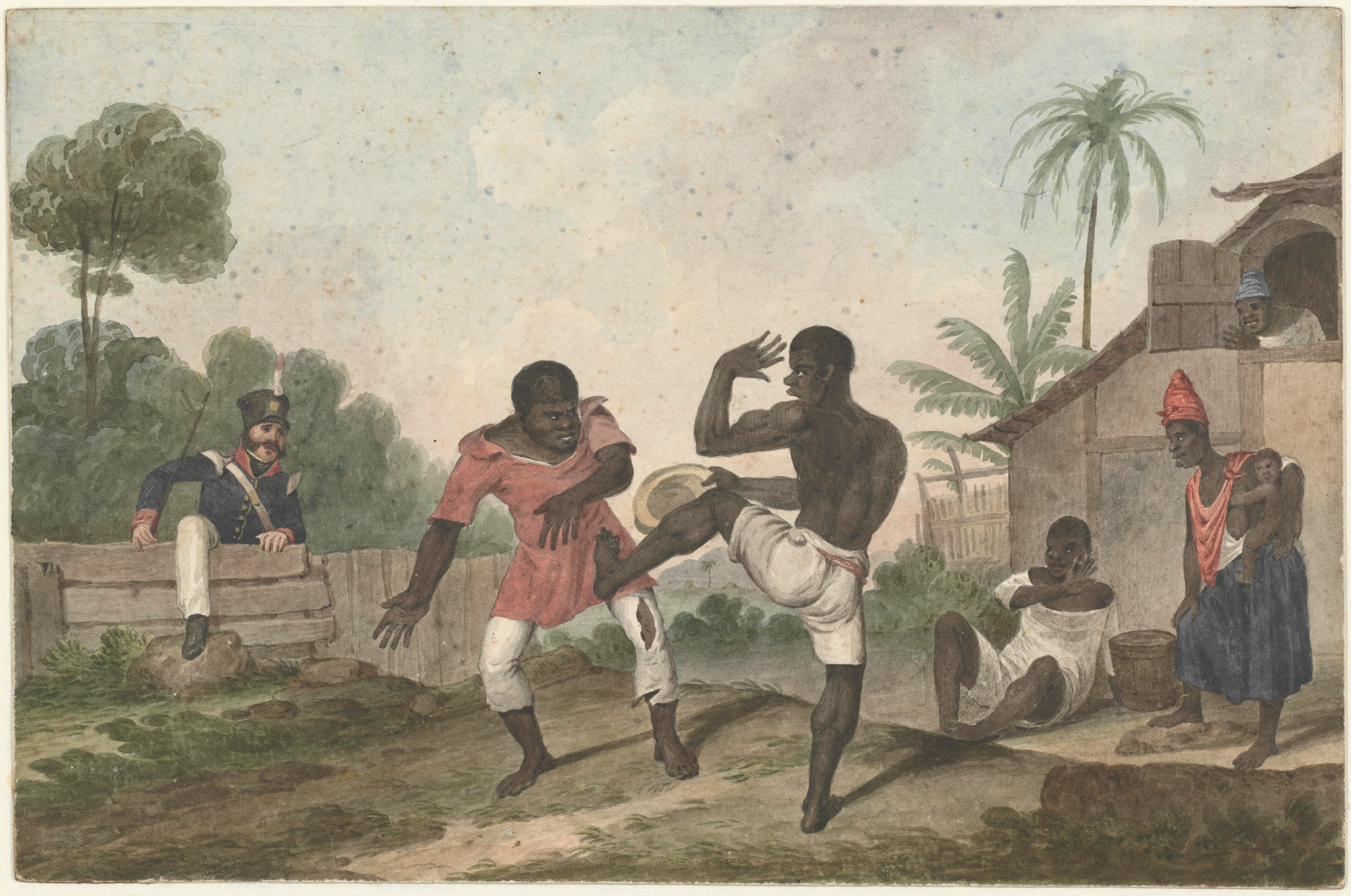
Capoeira, Brazils, watercolor by Augustus Earle, c. 1822

One of the first descriptions of inverted kicks is from 18th-century Bahia. The Inquisition case reported of a free African named João, who had the ability to become "possessed" and communicate with the ancestors. To achieve this, he would have to "walk on one foot, throwing the other one violently over his shoulder."

By the second half of the 18th century, engolo had become firmly established in Rio de Janeiro and other cities. The term playing angola was also used for the art, where both angola and engolo actually came from the same Bantu word. Among the Africans of Bahia, Angolan game was passed down as a kind of secret knowledge, which they did not share with others.

Any display of martial arts or even simple acrobatics among Black people was suspect and forbidden. During the 1780s, a free black individual in Rio was reported to the Inquisition for "witchcraft." One indicator of his role as a ritual specialist was his habit of hand walking.

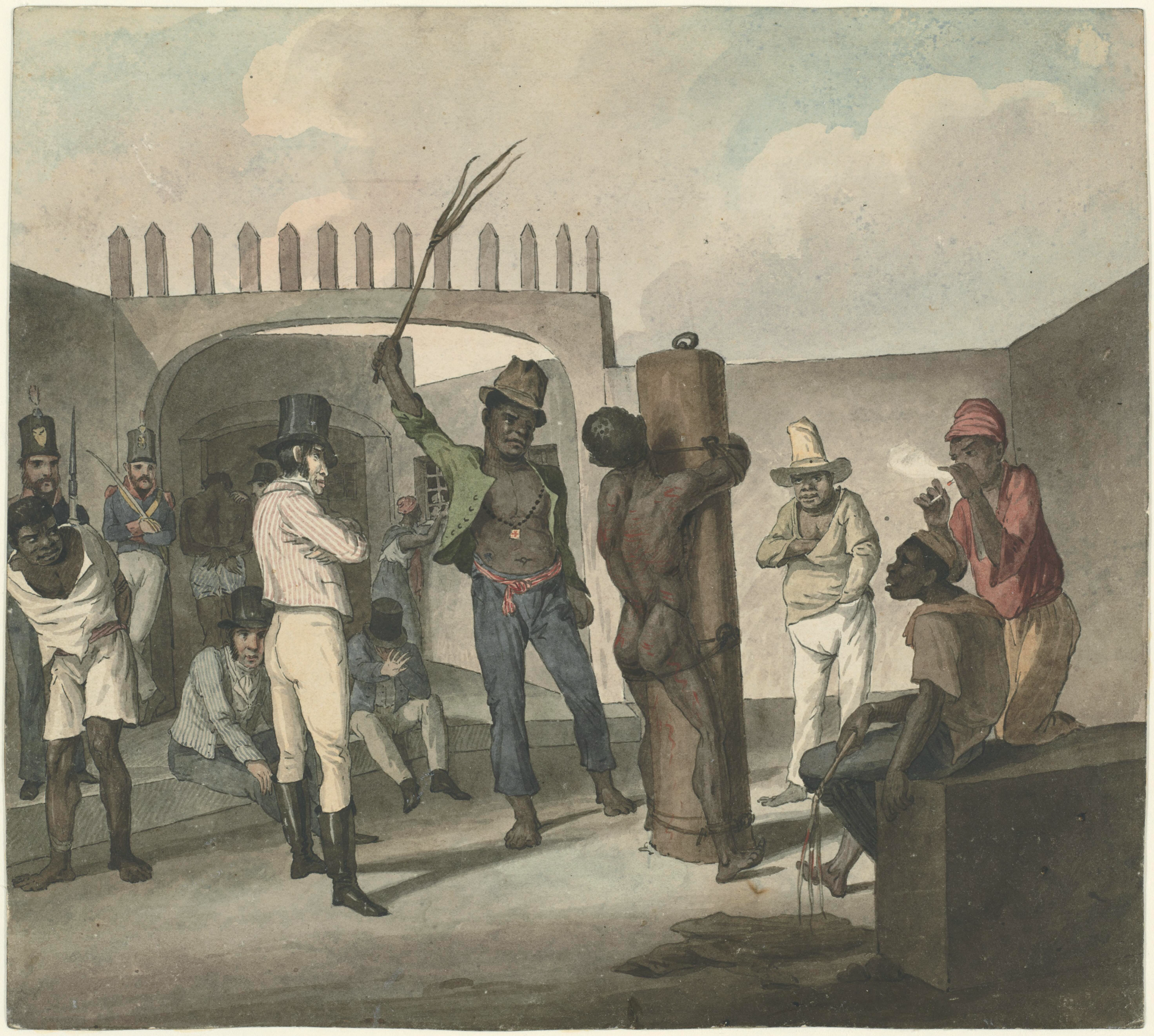
Punishing negroes at Cathabouco [i.e. Calabouço], Rio de Janeiro, watercolor by Augustus Earle, c. 1822

By the end of the 18th century, the Angolan fighting technique in Brazil started being referred to as capoeira, named after the clearings in the forest where freed slaves resides and practice its skills. The term "capoeira" is first mentioned in a judicial record from 1789. which reported how a young man named Adão was severely punished with 500 lashings for being capoeira:

A fight had occurred between capoeiras, and one of them had been murdered. According to the law of the kingdom, the gravest of crimes was the practice of capoeiragem [...] Adão was innocent regarding the murder charge, but his status as a capoeira was confirmed. As punishment he was to receive five hundred lashes and two years in public works.

— A judicial record from 1789.

Capoeira was practiced in senzalas (slave quarters), on rural plantations and among urban black communities. Police records of capoeira practices existed since the end of 18th century in Rio de Janeiro, Salvador and Recife. The colonial government tried to suppress it by establishing severe physical punishments, including hunting down practitioners and killing them openly.

== Debate regarding Brazilian influences and sources besides engolo ==
Many authors claim the origin of capoeira is unknown, viewing it as a melting pot of different arts and dances, created somewhere in Brazil. While in the past, many participants called the activity angola or brincar de angola ("playing angola"), in formal documents it became known as "capoeiragem", with a practitioner being known as a "capoeira". Gradually, the art became known as capoeira, with a practitioner being called a capoeirista. By the late 19th century, some began to dispute its African origins. In 1886, Plácido de Abreu rejected the oral tradition because at that time a capoeira-like game was not known in Africa. In the early 20th century, capoeira was rebranded as Brazil's national sport and a specific national product. Even Brazilian politicians started talking of capoeira as a national product, "superior to other martial arts". However, not all authors embraced the new theory. Inezil Penna Marinho wrote in 1936 that capoeira was brought to Brazil by enslaved Bantus.

Nestor Capoeira believes that capoeira "is a synthesis of dances, fights and musical instruments from different cultures, from different African regions, created on Brazilian soil", primarily in 19th century. Although, he notes that capoeira, unlike some other folklore "created by simple people", is not simple at all. It is an extremely sophisticated art based on a philosophy "that flows from the rodas to everyday life". He opposes the theory that capoeira originated in any specific place in Brazil, because it appeared in many places in many different forms. He suggests that capoeira might be "a sort of archetype that existed in the African collective unconscious that then sprouted and materialized itself in Brazil."

T.J. Desch-Obi finds that engolo, a Buntu martial art developed in Angola, was transferred to Brazil similar to how modern martial arts are transmitted. Then, the evolution from engolo to capoeira took place within a relatively isolated context, because the Portuguese lacked other unarmed martial arts to blend with. While some punching and grappling techniques were used in street fights, they were not incorporated into the philosophy and aesthetics of capoeira. The sole new form incorporated was headbutting, derived from a distinct African practice jogo de cabeçadas. Contemporary capoeira remained firmly based on crescent and push kicks, inverted positions, sweeps, and acrobatic evasions inherited from engolo.

However, Matthias Röhrig Assunção's research indicates that the Nkhumbi are the sole ethnic group in Angola known for practicing engolo. He questions why a practice limited to such a small ethnic group would have spread so far in Brazil. He suggests that two hypotheses about capoeira's origin are plausible: First, it may have resulted from related Angolan combat games brought to Brazilian ports and merged into capoeira. However, there's no evidence of engolo-like practices among other Angolan groups. Alternatively, a small Nkhumbi group could have laid the foundation for capoeira, incorporating contributions from other Africans. This raises questions about how such a minority could influence a broader enslaved community, although similar cultural evolutions have occurred before.

While Desch-Obi suggests martial arts could spread with just a "few practitioners introduced to a region", for Assunção "capoeira is much more than engolo." In addition, he points out Moraingy, a combat game from Madagascar, as a potential influence on capoeira.

I propose that the jogo de capoeira is both derived from an Angolan tradition and also a uniquely Brazilian expression of this tradition. Just as the version of jiujitsu developed in Brazil can be accurately termed Brazilian Jiu Jitsu without the need to deny its direct evolution from Japanese Jiu Jitsu.

— M. Thomas J. Desch-Obi

In addition, Maya Talmon-Chvaicer finds that West Central African fighting techniques, games, and dances likely influenced the development of capoeira in Brazil through the Atlantic slave trade from Congo-Angola.

== 19th century: Capoeira gangs of Rio de Janeiro ==
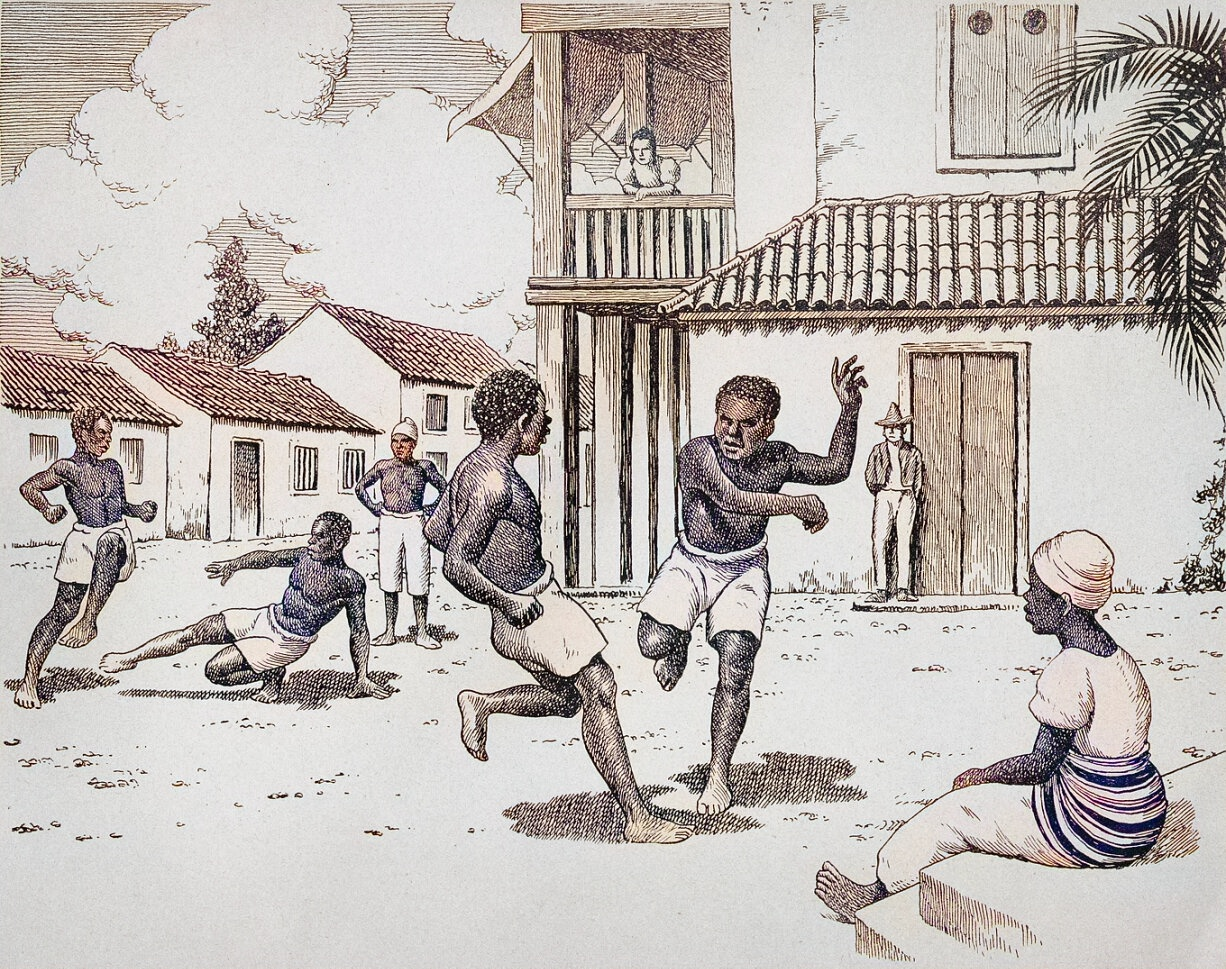
Blacks fighting, 19th c.

At the beginning of the 19th century, prince Dom João VI, along with the royal court, moved to Rio de Janeiro. Due to city growth, more slaves were brought to manufactures. More slaves were sent from Southern Angola to Rio de Janeiro than from any other region of Africa. Urban slaves usually worked without direct supervision, looking for employment and paid a portion to their master. That fostered the common practice of capoeira among them during and after work.

=== A violent slave game ===
In March 1814 the police chef saw violent capoeiras in the street, in the time where prince was passing by. They were "with knives and sticks and with the ribbons they sometimes use to come out, causing great mayhem and shouting". The police depicted capoeiragem as a well-organized network of territorial groups with their symbols and slang. According to a police report from 1815, the red hat was the symbol of the capoeristas. Some arrested capoeiras wore colored ribbons, especially yellow and red, associated with Kongo/Angola religions. They also commonly wear hats or caps, and on occasion, feathers. These items may have signified their ethnic identity, but it is unclear if they indicated gang affiliation. Some even were arrested for "walking as capoeiras."

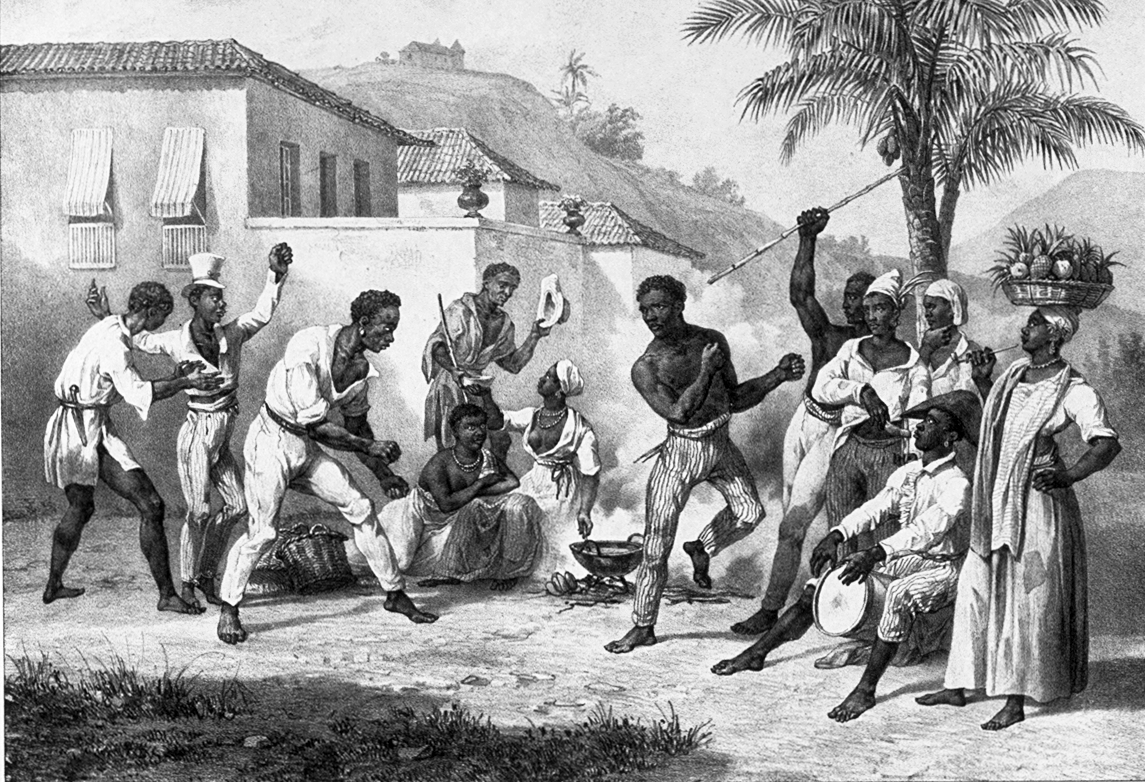
Playing capoeira or war dance, 1835, by Rugendas

Whistling was the way capoeiristas signaled each other. In 1817, the police declared strict penalties for possession of knives, and the same for those "whistling and with sticks", including 300 lashes (for slaves only) and three months of forced labor:

The same penalty will apply to all those who roam around the city, whistling and with sticks, committing disorder most of the times with no aim, and which are well known by the name of capoeiras, even if they do not provoke any injuries or death or any other crime […]

In 1817 one officer required the arrest of "all the negros and mulattos" that "entertain themselves in capoeiragem games" in seven different locations in the city. In 1821, the Military Commission of Rio de Janeiro wrote to the Minister of War about the "urgent necessity of punishing, without delay and in public, the negros capoeiras caught by the military school while provoking disorders". The letter also reported "six deaths and many knife wounds have been caused by these capoeiristas". On 6 February 1822, Emperor Pedro I pledged four days leave to any soldier who caught a capoeirista.

Between 1822 and 1825, the Bavarian painter Johann Moritz Rugendas describes capoeira as a headbutting game:

The Negroes also have another war game, much more violent, the jogar capoera: two champions charge against each other, and seek to hit with their head the chest of the opponent they want to throw to the ground. By jumps on the side, or equally skilful parries they escape from the attack; but by throwing themselves against each other, more or less like he-goats, they sometimes get badly hurt at the head: therefore one sees often the jesting being displaced by fury, to the point that blows and even knives stain the game with blood.

— Johann Moritz Rugendas

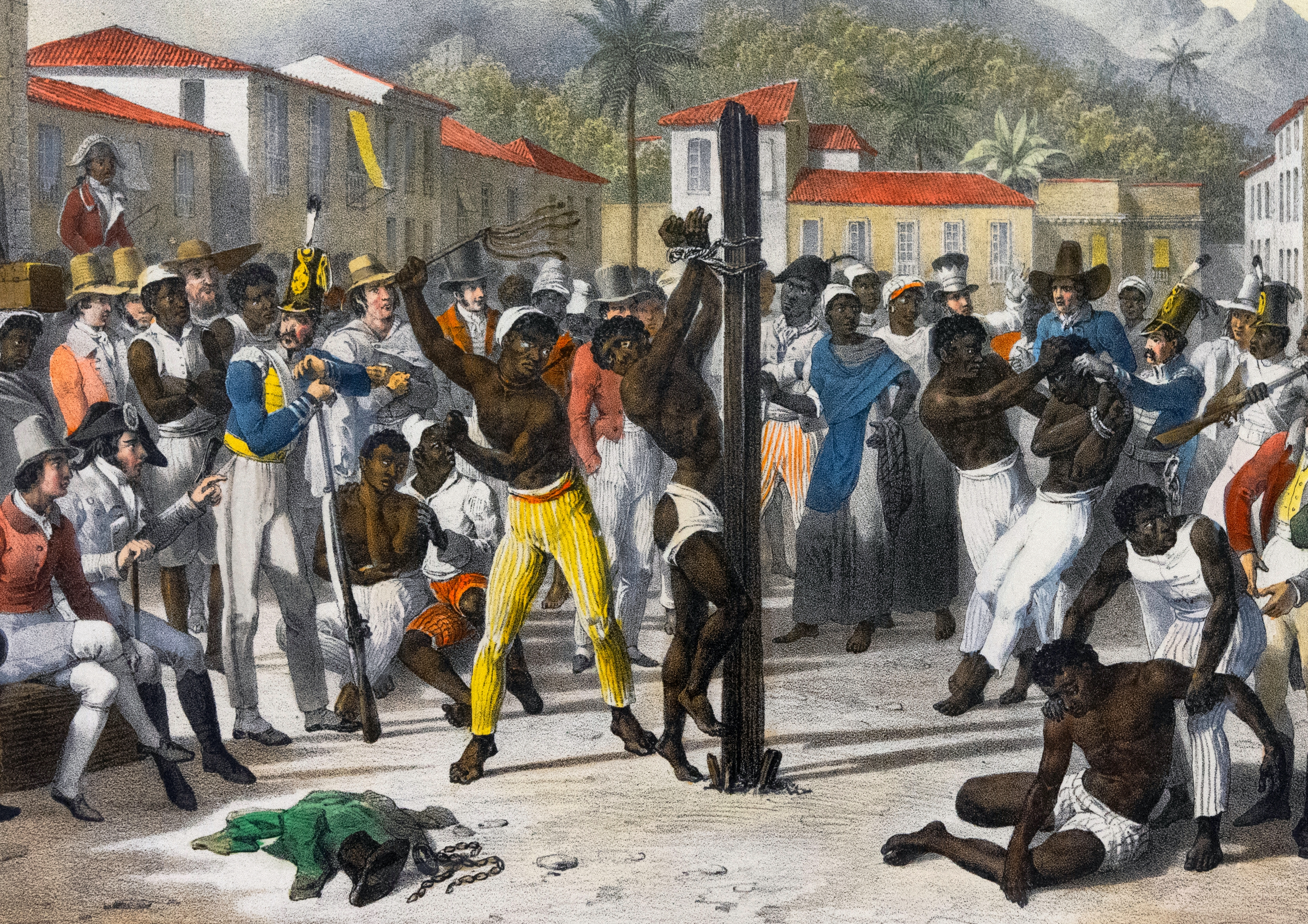
Public lashing of Negroes in Santa Ana Square c. 1830, by Rugendas.

In 1829, law limited the number of lashes for a slave to fifty per day. But exceptions were made for two major threats to the system: quilombolas and capoeiras, who were publicly whipped at pillars in Campo de Santana squares as a deterrent. In July 1831, a police patrol encountered a group of over 200 "blacks and mulattoes" engaged in a battle in the Catete suburb. They paused their fight and threw stones at the patrol, injuring its leader. When the patrol charged, they split into their distinct factions and dispersed in opposite directions. This incident implies a level of organization within the capoeira groups, during that period. This street-fighting capoeira was mix of various fighting techniques: foot kicks, head butts, hand blows, knife fight and stick-fighting. Only the kicks arguably originated from the Angolan art.

=== Mid-19th century: Increase in capoeira violence ===
Reverend James Fletcher, who visited Rio during the 1850s, characterized capoeira leaders as those with the most people killed. In a police report from February 1854, it was noted in only one afternoon "capoeiras committed seven murders in the parish of Santa Anna". The folklorist Mello Moraes describes how capoeiras violently interrupted public events in the mid-19th century Rio:

Sometimes, interrupting the course of a procession, or the pace of a parade, one could hear, jointly with screams of the ladies fleeing in terror, of negras carrying the young master in their arms, of fathers seeking refuge for their wife and children, the horrendous ‘Shut down! Shut down’. The caxinguelés [capoeira apprentices] flew at the front, capoeiragem exploded without restraints, and the mayhem resulted in broken heads, shattered light posts, stabbings and deaths.

Police data from the mid-19th century shows that capoeira was the main reason for the arrests:

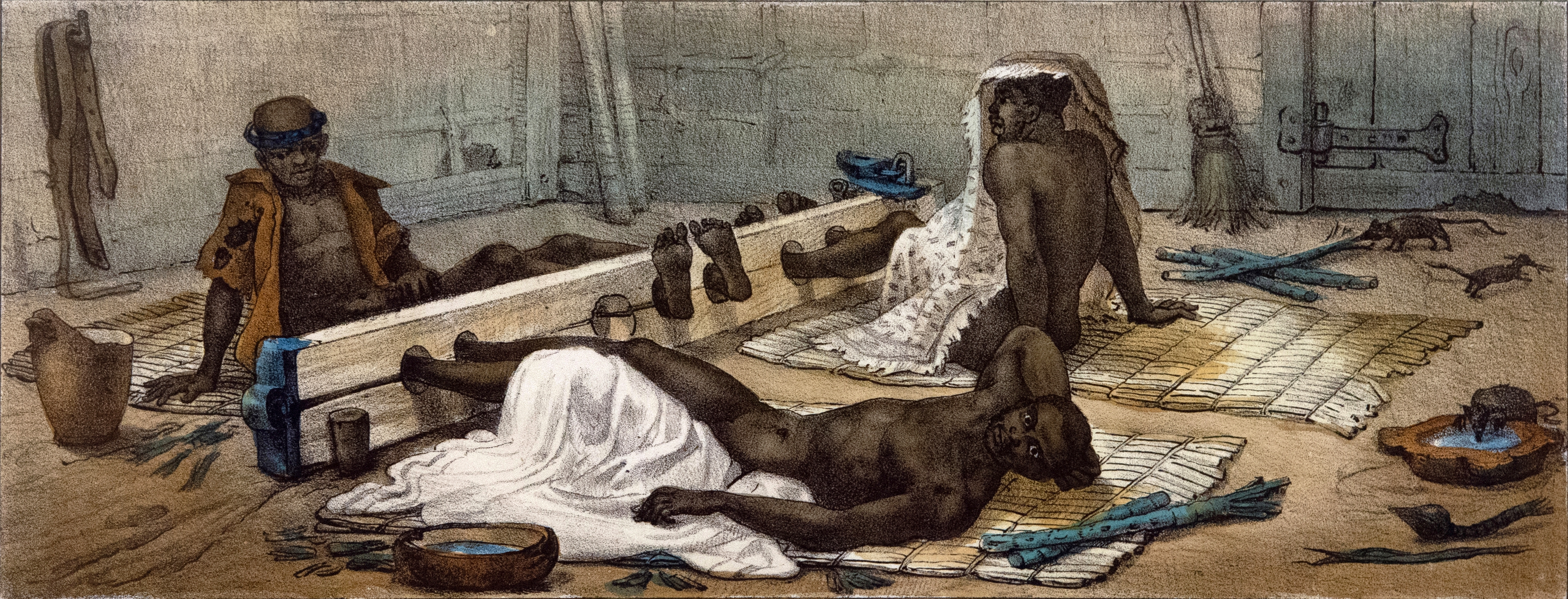
Negros in prison, circa 1830.

"From 288 slaves that entered the Calabouço jail during the years 1857 and 1858, 80 (31%) were arrested for capoeira, and only 28 (10.7%) for running away. Out of 4,303 arrests in Rio police jail in 1862, 404 detainees—nearly 10%—had been arrested for capoeira."

Standard punishment for imprisoned capoeiras were whipping (for slaves only) and forced labour in the dockyards.

On rural estates capoeira was played as a form of entertainment. In 1859, French journalist Charles Ribeyrolles described Afro-Brazilian free practices on a fazenda in Rio de Janeiro province:

Saturday evening, after the last working task of the week, and on holidays that give idleness and rest, the blacks have an hour or two of the evening for dancing. They assemble in their terreiro, calling, gathering and inciting each other, and the celebration starts. Here it is the capoeira, a kind of Pyrrhic dance, with daring combat evolutions, regulated by the Congo drum; there it is the batuque, with its cold or indecent postures which the urucungo, viola with thin cords, accelerates or contains; further away it is a frenzied dance where the gaze, the breasts and the hips provoke. It is a kind of inebriated convulsion one calls the lundu.

During the 1860s the capoeira gangs suffered severe disruption due to the draft for Paraguayan War. The police chief had made clear he wanted to use recruitment to clean the city of its capoeiras. However, in Rio alone 2900 slaves were freed because of their participation in the war, among them numerous capoeiras.

=== 1870s-1880s: The war of Nagoas and Guaiamos ===
By the 1870s the capoeira gangs formed two main maltas: Nagoas and Guaiamos, organized by city parishes. Guaiamú has parties such as Saint Francis, Saint Rita, Ouro Preto, Marinha, and Saint Domingos de Gusmão. Their color was red. Nagoa has parties like Saint Lucia, Saint Joseph, Lapa, Saint Anne, and Moura. They color was white. Many workers wearing these colors were often targeted with violence. These parties had leaders, assistants, policemen and rank-and-file soldiers, which indicates military principles in gang culture. Moreover, many capoeiras served as policemen, National Guards or soldiers.

Both gangs held regular Sunday exercises, with knife and razor blows:

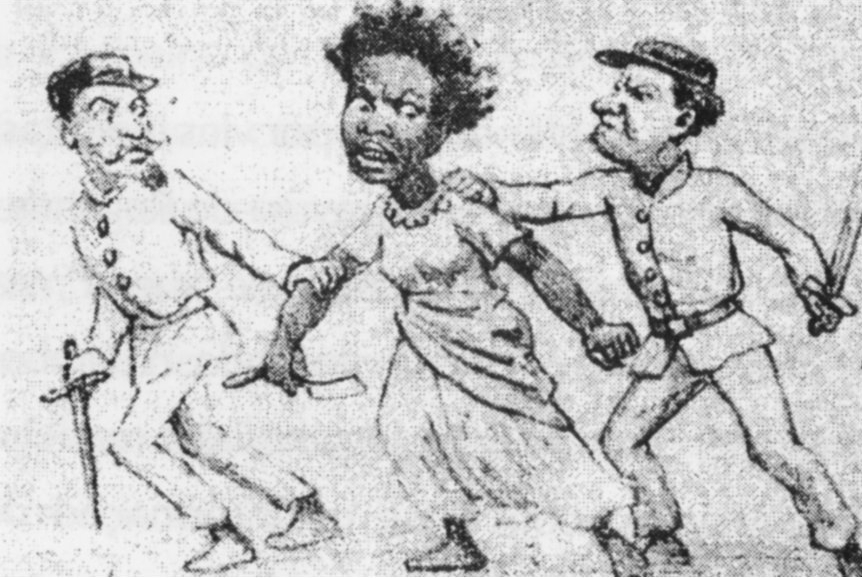
Female capoeira with razor 1882.

The most famous capoeiras served as instructors for the newcomers. At first, the blows were rehearsed, making use of the clean hand; when the disciple took advantage of the lessons, they began to be rehearsed with wooden weapons and finally they made use of their very blades, and the place of the exercises often became bloody.

Street battles among maltas were exceptionally brutal, marked by the use of all available weapons like clubs and knives, frequently resulting in a high number of casualties.

The Nagoas and Guaiamuns were used, respectively, as a hitforce by the Conservative and Liberal party. Republican party, founded in 1870, party was among the rare political entities consistently opposed the maltas. The major political incident occurred in 1873, when capoeira gangs violently broke republican meeting, inspired by the declaration of a republic in Spain.

In 1881 the majority of the arrested capoeiras (60%) were free citizens (usually workers), against 40% slaves. In 1885, whites represented at least 22% of the arrested capoeiras, increasing to 33% in 1890, blacks counted for 36% and 30% respectively, while others not being qualified in terms of colour.

=== 1880s-1890s: Political violence and the ban on capoeira ===
On 13 May 1888 slavery ended in Brazil with the Golden Law, signed by Princess Isabel. Immediately after, the Brazilian Imperial regime formed the Black Guard (Guarda Negra), secret paramilitary organization composed of freed African slaves and capueristas. The purpose was to ensure the Princess Isabel's accession to the throne, in opposition to the rising Republican movement. The Guarda Negra capoeiristas did horrible crimes, violently disrupting both private and public gatherings of republicans. The greatest assault occurred on 30 December 1888, during the republicans’ gathering at the French Gymnastic Society. When Silva Jardim began his speech, the room became a battleground, with many dead and wounded.

On 15 November 1889, the First Brazilian Republic was proclaimed. Following the coup, the Republicans implemented strict measures against gangs. In merely a week, 111 capoeiras were arrested. In 1890, new Republic decreed the prohibition of capoeira in the whole country.

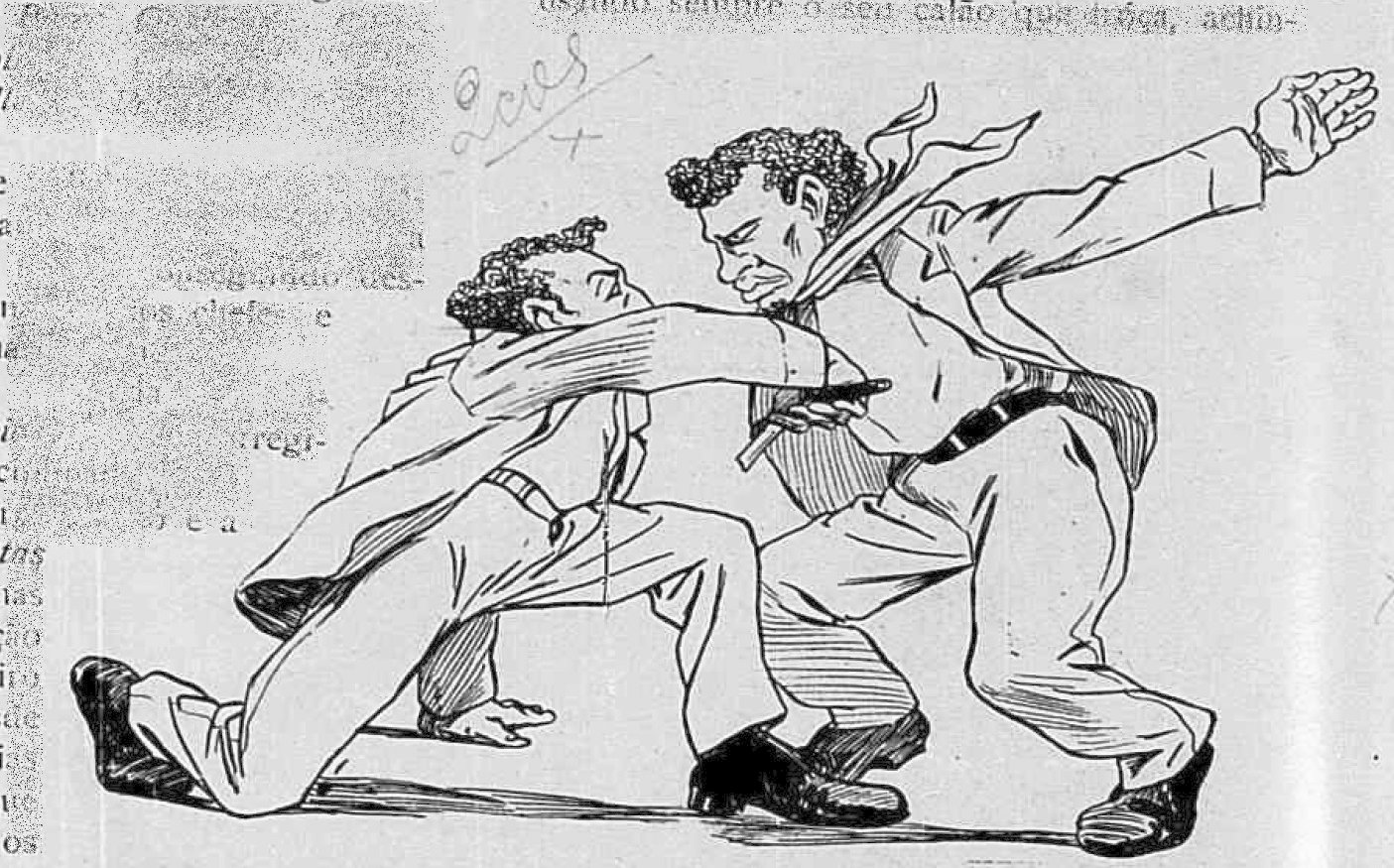
Capoeira carioca using lamparina, a straight razor attack to the victim's neck artery, by Calixto, 1906.

To engage in exercises of agility and physical dexterity known as capoeiragem in public streets and squares; to engage in running with weapons or instruments capable of causing bodily harm, inciting riots or disorders, threatening specific or unspecified individuals, or instilling fear of harm: Penalty – imprisonment for two to six months. For leaders or heads, the penalty shall be doubled.

— Penal Code of the United States of Brazil (1890), On Vagrants and Capoeira

During the prohibition, any individual caught practicing capoeira would be arrested. Street rodas seemingly vanished, although remnants might have endured in certain shantytowns or working-class neighborhoods. The capoeira was slowly extinguished in Rio and Recife, preserved only in Bahia.

It was during this period that legendary capoeira fighters, such as Besouro in Bahia, Nascimento Grande in Recife and Manduca da Praia in Rio, made their fame.

== 20th century ==
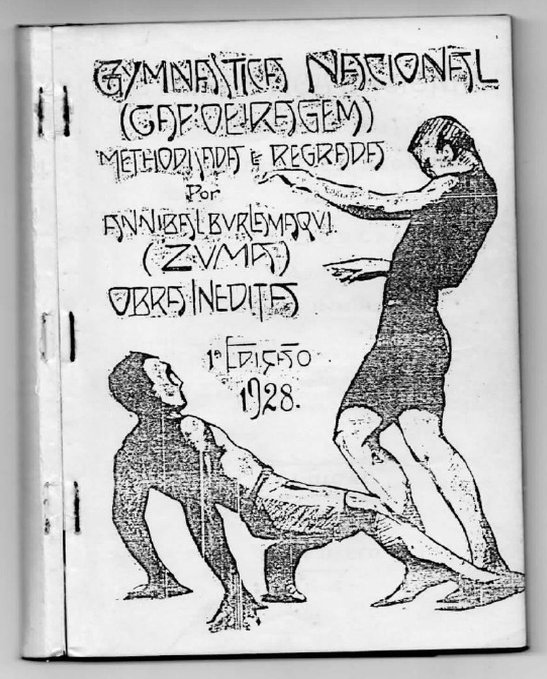
Mestre Zuma's book, Gymnástica Nacional (capoeiragem), 1928.

=== Early 20th century, 1910s, and 1920s ===
At the beginning of the 20th century, some capoeira teachers attempted to bypass the ban by incorporating elements from gymnastics and other legal martial arts, such as judo. Professor Mario Aleixo was the first in showing a capoeira "revised, made bigger and better", which he mixed with judo, wrestling, jogo do pau and other arts to create Defesa Pessoal (Personal Defense). In 1928, Anibal "Zuma" Burlamaqui published the first capoeira manual, Ginástica nacional, Capoeiragem metodizada e regrada, where he also introduced boxing-like rules for capoeira competition. It was greatly influential, being even taught at academies. Inezil Penha Marinho published a similar book. Felix Peligrini founded a capoeira school in the 1920s, intending to practice it scientifically.

=== 1930s: Legalization and birth of capoeira regional ===
Mestre Sinhozinho from Rio de Janeiro created a training method in 1930 that divested capoeira from all its music and traditions in the process of making it a complete martial art. While those efforts helped to keep capoeira alive, they also led the traditional form of capoeira to decline.

State repression of capoeira was reduced when Getúlio Vargas took power in 1930. In the early 1930s Mestre Bimba, a traditional capoeirista with both legal and illegal fights in his records, founded his school in Salvador, Bahia. He developed systematic training method for capoeira, including traditional elements of music and dance, as well as new elements from other martial arts. Advised by Cisnando, Bimba called his style luta regional raiana (regional Bahian fight), because capoeira was still illegal. In 1937, Bimba founded Centro de Cultura Física e Luta Regional, with permission from Salvador's Secretary of Education. His work was very well received, and he taught capoeira to the cultural elite of the city. This style of capoeira teaching has been called an academy, based on specialized public classes. As anthropologist Greg Downey writes, "With the advent of the academy, capoeira became legal: what had been a crime was transformed into physical education."

=== Mid-20th century: Birth of Capoeira Angola and national popularity ===
Reacting to a series of reforms, which changed capoeira almost beyond recognition, Mestre Pastinha decided to preserve and popularize the traditional African style known as capoeira de Angola, from which the reformers distanced themselves. In the 1941, he founded his Centro Esportivo de Capoeira Angola (CECA), in the Salvador neighborhood of Pelourinho, which attracted many traditional capoeiristas. The term capoeira Angola was derived from brincar de angola ("playing angola"), the term used in the earlier days. The name was used by other masters too, including those not part of Pastinha's school. Other icons of the capoeira Angola at that time include Waldemar, Cobrinha Verde and Gato Preto.

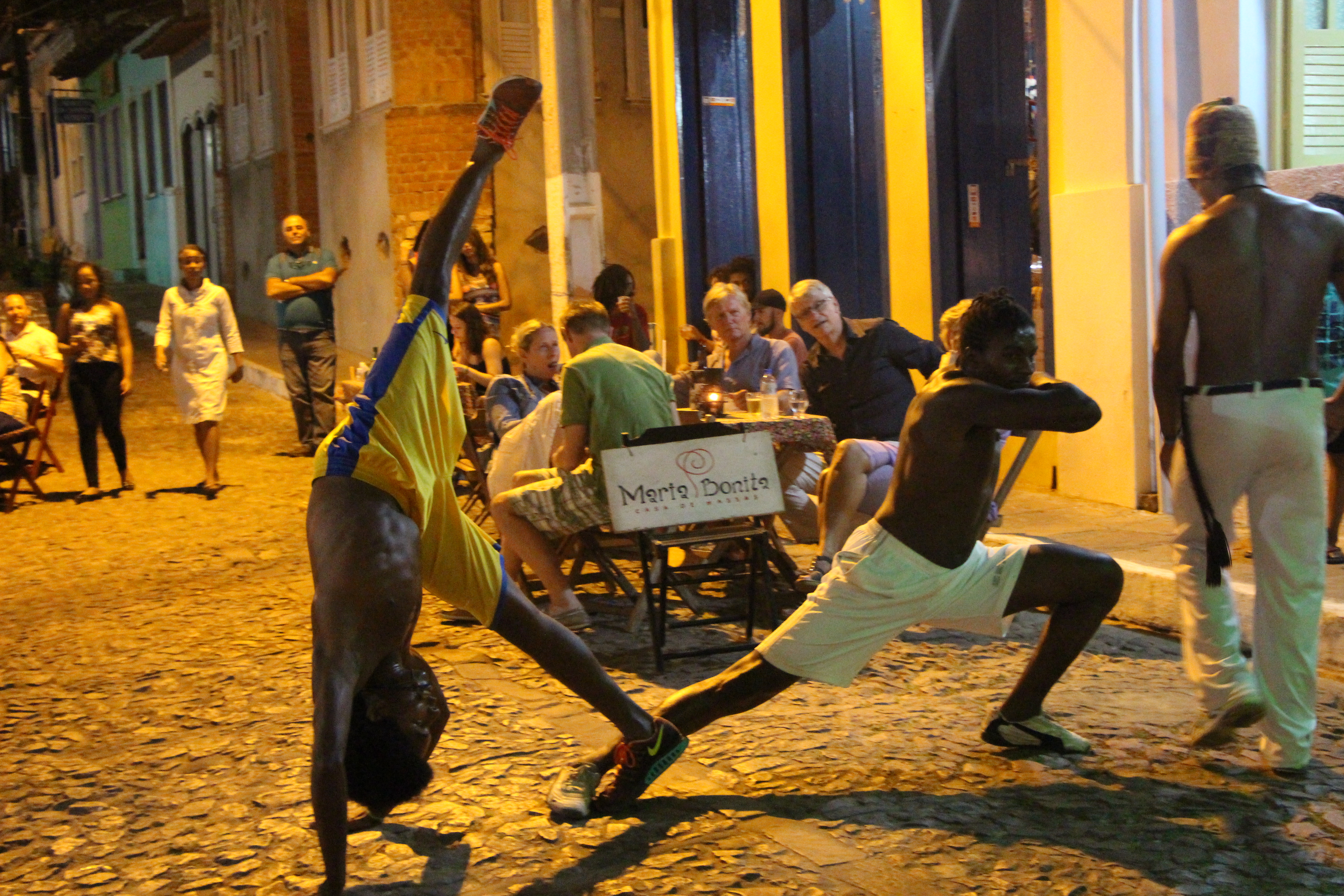
Bahian street capoeira.

It was through the academia system that capoeira spread throughout Brazil. From the 1950s onward, Bahian capoeira styles, Regional and Angola, gained nationwide popularity in Brazil. Many Bahian migrants in Rio de Janeiro began teaching capoeira. In 1953, President Vargas called capoeira Brazil's "one true national sport."

In the 1950s and 1960s, the city of Salvador's Tourism Office sponsored capoeira shows. However, these were meant to be amusing and lacked authenticity. Ethnographer Waldeloir Rego reports that in the 1960s capoeira practitioners frequently performed in front of bars in return for money or beer. However, over the course of the 1960s Bimba's more combative regional style spread through the country and became the dominant form of capoeira practice.

=== 1970s and 1980s ===
On 26 December 1972, the Brazilian government recognized capoeira as an official sport. During the early 1970s, the military regime tried to regulate capoeira, aiming to turn it into a national gymnastics. In 1972, the Confedederação Brasileira de Pugilismo (CBP) (Brazilian Boxing Confederation) introduced Technical rules of capoeira, regulating kicks, ethics, uniforms, competitions, and standardizing student levels. Belts in the colors of the Brazilian flag were used for student identification. Initially allowing most movements, head butts were banned due to accidents, and games became more regulated. Salve! before or after classes and displaying a Brazilian flag became mandatory. Spontaneous rodas after tournaments were forbidden. In 1974, the Boxing Confederation promoted the first national capoeira competition in Rio de Janeiro.

All these attempts to control capoeira by the state were far from successful. Capoeira's practice spread nationwide in the 1970s and 1980s, with the growth of groups like Muzenza. This made the profession of capoeira teachers more attractive, particularly for black and poor males without formal education. Beginning in the early 1970s, there was increasing participation by women in the game.

In the mid-1970s, the Senzala Group of Rio became particularly influential. As Nestor Capoeira characterizes them, these were young men primarily of the white middle class who trained intensively. This group was also in conversation with the larger Brazilian martial arts scene, which included leaders and innovators in karate and jiu-jitsu. There was some debate about capoeira losing its roots in the Black community and its history. In 1979, capoeira was the theme of a Brazilian film titled Cordão de Ouro.

In the 1980s, there was a turn toward investigating the authentic roots of capoeira and resisting systematic athleticism in its culture. Capoeira angola became more popular, linked to a broader movement to revive Afro-Bahian popular culture. The capoeira organization Grupo de Capoeira Angola Pelourinho (GCAP) criticized a perceived "whitening" of capoeira and emphasized musicality over self-defense or athletic display. This was linked to the Bahian Carnival movement. Capoeira also appeared in the 1984 film Quilombo, about the Palmares community of escaped slaves in the 17th century.

=== 1990s ===
In the mid-1990s, some capoeira practitioners integrated kicks and grappling from other martial arts, leading to a more aggressive style. There was national controversy in 1996 when one man died after suffering a punctured lung in a roda.

At the same time, capoeira became more professionalized and more common in health clubs and gymnasiums.

== International spread of capoeira ==
Artur Emídio is likely the first capoeirista to perform abroad, traveling to Americas and Europe during the 1950s and early 1960s. Nestor Capoeira likely became the first to teach capoeira in Europe. After receiving his red belt, he ventured abroad, teaching in London in 1971 and touring European cities for three years. Since the 1970s, Mestre Lucídio taught capoeira in Japan. Jelon Vieira began teaching capoeira in New York City in 1975. He founded the Capoeira Foundation in the U.S. in 1976. Demonstrations by Vieira may have inspired the incorporation of some capoeira movements into breakdancing. Bira Almeida, Mestre Bimba's student, settled on the West Coast of the United States in 1979. Afterward, numerous Brazilian groups toured Europe, the United States, and other countries, showcasing capoeira alongside other Brazilian rhythms and dances. Almeida reported that in 1984 there were about 300 capoeira students in California, 60 in New York, and about 100 scattered elsewhere.

In 1987 Senzala teachers Mestre Peixinho, Sorriso, Garrincha, and Toni Vargas spent six months in Europe, organizing workshops and the first European Capoeira Encounter. In 1992, João Grande, a highly respected capoeira mestre, established his academy in New York. Since 1988, Mestre Paulo Siqueira has organized the annual summer meeting in Hamburg, which became one of Europe's largest capoeira events. In 1994, capoeira appeared in an American martial arts film, Only the Strong. In 2001, Europe saw its first native mestre, Edgardo Sananiello.

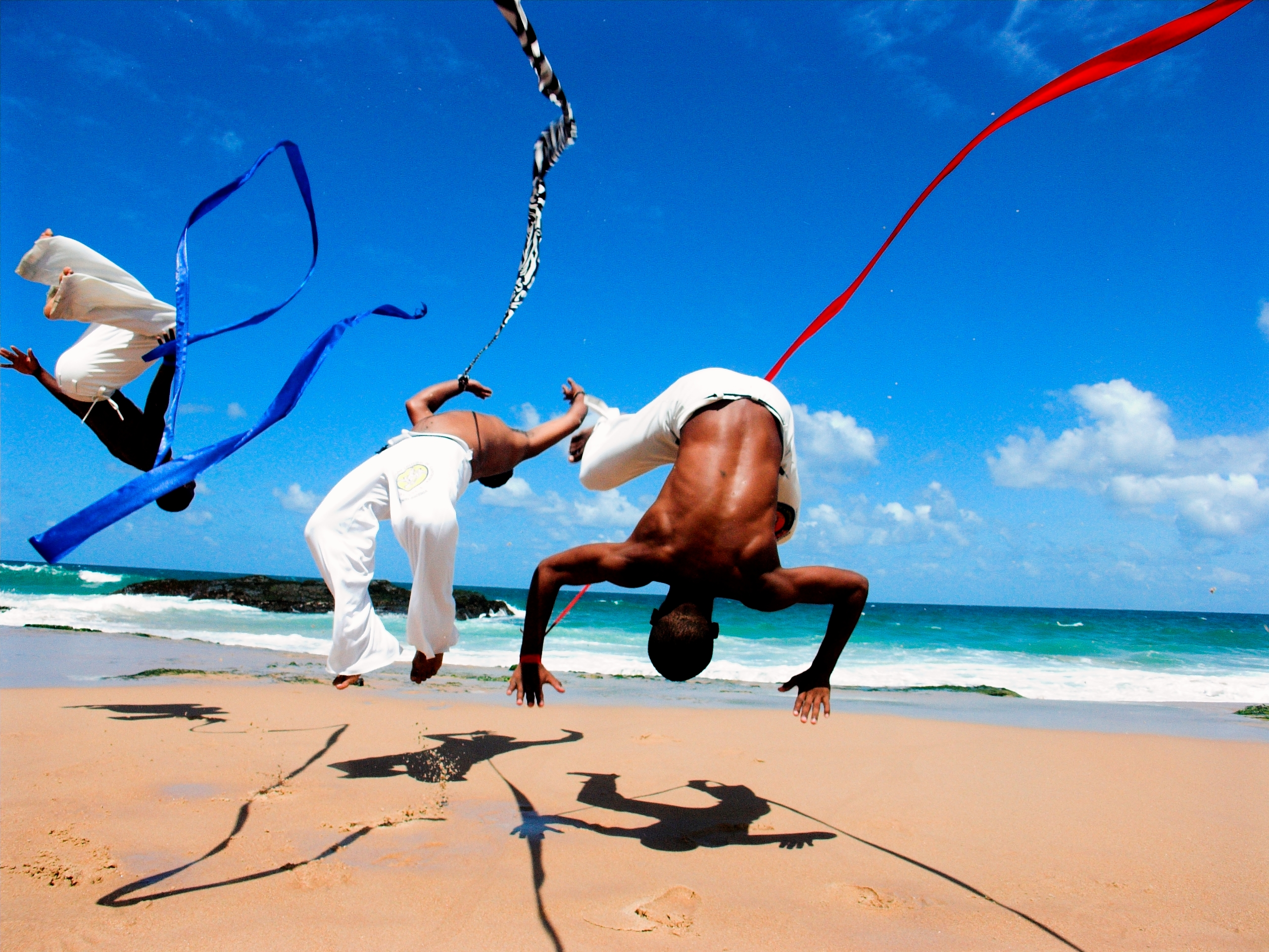
Art work with capoeira masters – touching the sky

In April 2002 the First International Capoeira Championship of Asia and the Pacific took place in Sydney, featuring 60 groups. In 2002, a Brazilian capoeira group also traveled to Angola to connect with the roots of the art form.

In 2004, capoeira appeared in a variety of American movies, TV shows, and video games and became a fitness trend. Anthropologist Katya Wesolowski notes that "capoeira had become an 'exotic' dance-fitness fad stripped of contextual signifiers and packaged for global consumption." As of 2006, Nestor Capoeira estimated about 7,000 capoeira students in the United States.

Capoeira today is an active exporter of Afro-Brazilian culture all over the world. Present on every continent, every year capoeira attracts thousands of foreign students and tourists to Brazil. Foreign capoeiristas work hard to learn Portuguese to better understand and become part of the art. Renowned capoeira mestres often teach abroad and establish their own schools. Capoeira presentations, normally theatrical, acrobatic and with little martiality, are common sights around the world.

Generally, globalized capoeira tends to be highly inclusive. The capoeira school has become a space where "class, ethnic, gender and cultural differences are played out and renegotiated". Moreover, Wesolowski suggests that it has become increasingly globalized: "Early capoeira migration from the 1970s to 1990s was predominantly to North America, Europe, Australia, and Japan--places where Brazilian instructors hoped to improve their quality of life. Starting in the early 2000s, capoeira groups were popping up in African, South American, and Caribbean locales."

In 2014 the capoeira circle was added to UNESCO's Representative List of the Intangible Cultural Heritage of Humanity, the convention recognised that the "capoeira circle is a place where knowledge and skills are learned by observation and imitation" and that it "promotes social integration and the memory of resistance to historical oppression".

== Literature ==
- Almeida, Bira (1986). Capoeira: A Brazilian Art Form. North Atlantic Books. ISBN 978-0938190295.
- Assunção, Matthias Röhrig (2002). Capoeira: The History of an Afro-Brazilian Martial Art. Routledge. ISBN 978-0-7146-8086-6.
- Capoeira, Nestor (2002). Capoeira: Roots of the Dance-Fight-Game. Blue Snake Books. ISBN 978-1-58394-637-4.
- Capoeira, Nestor (2006). A Street-Smart Song: Capoeira Philosophy and Inner Life. Blue Snake Books. ISBN 978-1-58394-155-3.
- Capoeira, Nestor (2007). The Little Capoeira Book. Blue Snake Books. ISBN 9781583941980.
- Talmon-Chvaicer, Maya (2008). The Hidden History of Capoeira: A Collision of Cultures in the Brazilian Battle Dance. University of Texas Press. ISBN 978-0-292-71723-7.
- Desch-Obi, Thomas J. (2008). Fighting for Honor: The History of African Martial Art Traditions in the Atlantic World. University of South Carolina Press. ISBN 978-1-57003-718-4.
- Downey, Greg (2005). Learning Capoeira: Lessons in Cunning from an Afro-Brazilian Art. Oxford University Press. ISBN 978-0-19-517697-1.
- Miranda, Clícea Maria Augusto (2011). Memórias e Histórias da Guarda Negra: verso e reverso de uma combativa organização de libertos. São Paulo, Brazil.
- Wesolowski, Katya (2023). Capoeira Connections: A Memoir in Motion. University of Florida Press. ISBN 978-1-68340-320-3.

== See also ==
- Engolo
- Capoeira
- Slavery in Brazil
