= Grupo Capoeira Brasil =

Capoeira group

- Date founded: January 14, 1989
- Country of origin: Brazil
- Founder: Mestre Boneco, Mestre Paulão, Mestre Paulinho Sabiá
- Arts taught: Capoeira Regional • Capoeira Angola • Banguela • Iúna
- Ancestor arts: Capoeira • Luta Regional Baiana • Capoeira Angola • Batuque

Grupo Capoeira Brasil is an organization that practices, teaches, and demonstrates the Afro-Brazilian martial art of Capoeira. Grupo Capoeira Brasil practices a style of Capoeira known as Capoeira Regional Contemporânea. This style is derived from movements and sequences developed and systematized by Mestre Bimba's Luta Regional Baiana, the adapted techniques of Grupo Senzala, as well as influences from the founding Mestres of Grupo Capoeira Brasil, each of whom brought personal contributions specific to their ideology, stylistic methodology and personality.

== History and Formation ==
Grupo Capoeira Brasil was founded on January 14, 1989, by Luis Roberto Simas, Paulo César da Silva Sousa, and Paulão Sales Neto known in the capoeira community by their nome de guerra: Mestre Boneco, Mestre Paulinho Sabiá and Mestre Paulão Ceará, respectively. All three Mestres had trained under Grupo Senzala, one of the most influencing capoeira groups and pioneers of Capoeira Contemporânea during the late 1960s and 70s. Paulão, Boneco, and Paulinho trained under the guidance of Mestre Camisa.

During the late 1980s, as a result of different ideologies, many of Grupo Senzala's "Corda Vermelhas"/"Red Cords" (Grupo Senzala's highest graduation) left to pursue their own work. As such, Grupo Capoeira Brasil was inaugurated in the city of Niterói, Rio de Janeiro, Brazil, in honor of the recent centennial of the abolishment of slavery in Brazil (see Lei Áurea). Under the supervision and blessing of its "padrinhos", or godfathers, Mestre Gato, Mestre Peixinho and Mestre Rafael Flores (founders of Grupo Senzala), Mestre Suassuna, Mestre Itapoã, Mestre Peixinho, and the late Mestre Ezekiel, Grupo Capoeira Brasil arose. Today, Grupo Capoeira Brasil has spread internationally with over 1.300 groups and 400 instructors.

== Graduation system ==
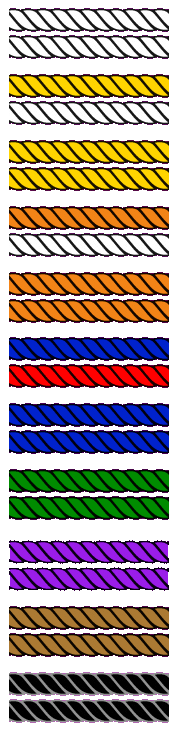
Grupo Capoeira Brasil graduation colors, from Beginner/Iniciante (top) to Formado (bottom)

Grupo Capoeira Brasil uses eight different colors in their graduation system. They are: Yellow, Orange, Red, Blue, Green, Purple, Brown and Black. Beginner students (before becoming Graduados) have transitional cords between the main cords, for example: Yellow and Raw cord.

The highest-level color should be worn on the top, as shown in the image.

- Raw (Beginner/Iniciante): Students begin their Capoeira training at this level. The Corda Crua, translated as Raw Cord, signifies that rather than being seen as inexperienced, students are seen as being full of potential for growth.
- Yellow/Raw (Aluno Batizado): Typically, this is a cord given to students to welcome them to the world of Capoeira. Here the students begin to learn the names of techniques and start learning the chorus of basic corridos.
- Yellow (Aluno): At this level, students have a basic knowledge of the fundamentals, such as esquivas, kicks and ground movements. They begin to demonstrate a novice understanding of the Capoeira game and application of movements. Students know the choruses to some songs and are starting to practice instruments.
- Orange/Raw (Aluno): Students begin to understand the importance of developing their game, as well, as the importance of music and organization in the roda. A comprehension of fundamental techniques, its appropriate name and application begins to develop.
- Orange (Aluno): At this level students have a much deeper understanding of the Capoeira game. They now begin utilizing many different kicks and acrobatic movements. Students are also capable of singing solos during a roda and playing many different instruments. Knowledge concerning the group origins and history of capoeira is important in the student's development. At this level, students begin to learn and develop techniques of Angola.
- Blue/Red (Estagiário a Graduado/Monitor): Students earn the title of Estagiário a Graduado/Monitor at this level. Estagiário a Graduado study class from an outside perspective as they themselves begin learning how to teach, and may even be able to teach under the supervision of their instructor. They also aid any lower-ranked students in need of assistance. They have a large repertoire of songs, and can play any instrument. As Capoeiristas, students at this level have a knowledge of the fundamentals and are able to fully incorporate it, movimentação and acrobatic movements in the roda. Estágiarios begin to learn variations of kicks, cadência do jogo and tempo de entrada. Their Angola games also begin to develop. At this level, they are introduced to Mestre Bimba's Jogo de Balões - Cintura Desprezada.
- Blue (Graduado/Instrutor): At this level, students earn the title of Graduado, which means "Graduated". Students have a proficiency in the fundamentals of their Capoeira Brasil lineage, Mestre Bimba's Eight Sequences, Cintura Desprezada, history of the group and capoeira, and a developed game dependent of the toque. In a sense, this is also a new beginning for students, a new "Corda Crua", because, as mentioned before, assessments are based on teaching ability, loyalty and Group expansion. They must learn to share their own knowledge with other students. It is for this reason that students at this level are encouraged to begin teaching a class of their own. Students that teach a class of their own may be given the title "Instrutor."
- Green (Instrutor Avançado): At this level, Capoeiristas continue to improve on their overall skills, which now includes the ability to teach. They are very strong in the roda, and are equally as strong when teaching a class. Their strength comes from their ability to incorporate Malicia, or deviousness, into their game. It's malicia that gives Capoeiristas their ability to surprise and confuse their opponents.
- Purple (Professor): To reach this level, Capoeiristas must have proven themselves to be skilled martial artists in the roda and outside their Group. They are proficient teachers and trusted to be a representative of the Group. Professors are regarded very highly, as they have come very far and have devoted their lives to being part of Capoeira. Their malicia skills continue to increase, since they now have the ability to apply the knowledge they've gained within the roda to their dealings in the outside world, and vice versa.
- Brown (Formando): In Grupo Capoeira Brasil, brown cords are not referred to as Contramestre (Foreman), as in other groups, rather they are uniquely addressed as "Formando". Formando means graduating in Portuguese, as the student is reaching the culmination of Grupo Capoeira Brasil's cord levels. They are not only some of the most important figures of their group, but in the world of Capoeira itself. They are the right hand of the Mestres within their lineage, and are so esteemed and honored that, even at this level, they are respected as Mestres. Formidable players in the roda, Formandos can seamlessly combine all of their skills into a fierce and relentless game.
- Black: (Formado): The black cord was created as an homage to Zumbi dos Palmares, a legendary figure in the story of the abolition of slavery. This is the apex for students of Grupo Capoeira Brasil; the highest and hardest level to achieve. Once graduated to the black cord, the capoeirista is then titled "Formado", or Graduate. A black cord is known as “Formado” or "Corda Preta" within Grupo Capoeira Brasil. The black cord does not indicate that one is a “Mestre.” A Mestre is not formed nor graduated. Instead, this is something he becomes and is recognized within the capoeira community with time, dedication, loyalty, humility, knowledge of fundamentals and acquisition of political and social conscience. This is the ideology of Grupo Capoeira Brasil. A black cord or “Formado” only becomes a Mestre after being officially awarded the title.

Mestres are legendary for their skill, wisdom, and tact both inside and out of the roda. They have solidified their Capoeira games by consolidating all of the physical skills they've learned through their years of training with the cunning and trickery they've learned through their life experience. Mestres work to preserve the teaching of the founders, legacy of the grand fathers and "Velha Guarda" of Capoeira's past and the heritage of Capoeira's Afro-Brazilian roots. They impart their wisdom and experience in creating students and professors of quality and character. Mestres comprise the top echelon of all Capoeira groups, and it is therefore their right to oversee and supervise the on-goings of the group they lead.

== Formados and Mestres ==
In addition to the founders, Grupo Capoeira Brasil has thirty eight other black cords, many of which who have received the title of "Mestre".
