= Capoeira Regional =

Tradition of the Afro-Brazilian martial art

Capoeira regional
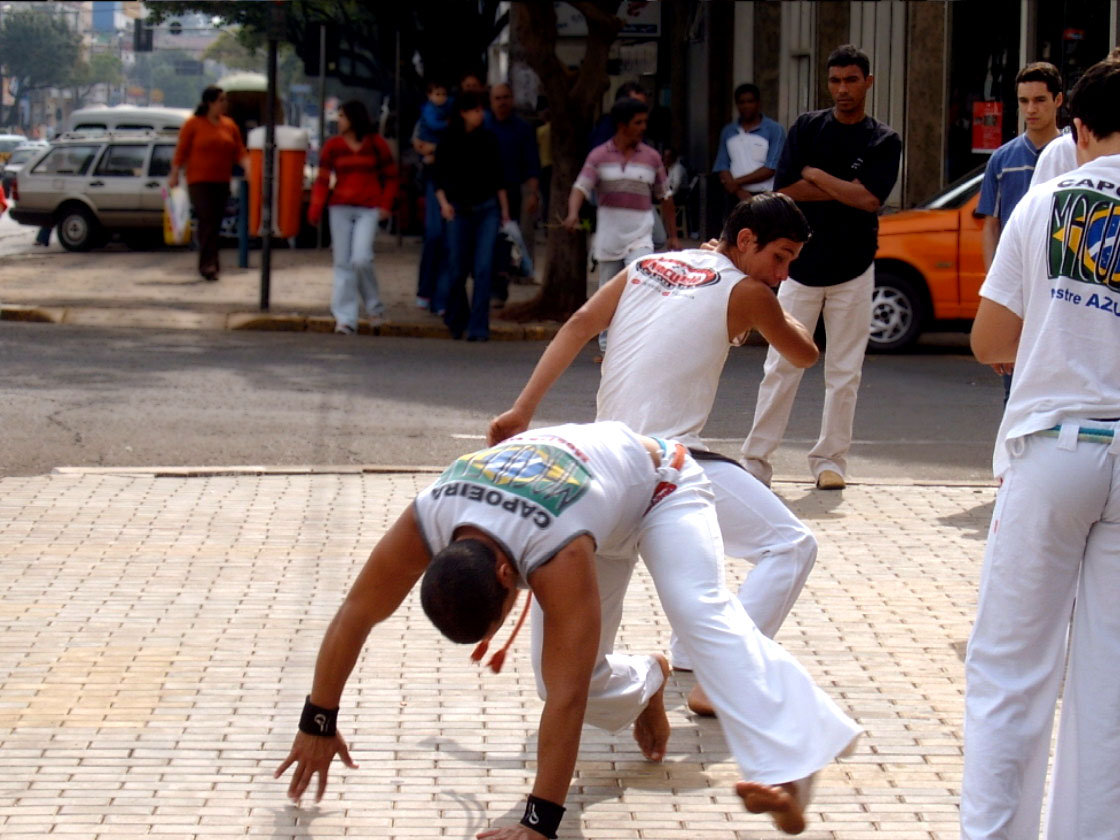
- Capoeiristas outside
- Also known as: Luta Regional Baiana
- Date founded: 1932
- Country of origin: Brazil (Bahia)
- Founder: Mestre Bimba
- Arts taught: Capoeira
- Descendant schools: Grupo Senzala
- Practitioners: Bira Almeida; Nestor Capoeira; Jelon Vieira; Mestre Camisa; Amen Santo

Capoeira Regional is a tradition of capoeira created in the 1930s by Mestre Bimba's reform of earlier capoeira. Capoeira regional presents itself as an Afro-Brazilian practice and as a legitimate and effective martial art. This tradition of capoeira was the first to be validated by the Brazilian state and advocated as a national sport for all Brazilians. It contrasts with the approach of capoeira Angola, which was founded a decade later and aims to maintain a more traditional practice. Capoeira regional discards some of the aspects of traditional capoeira that are impractical in a real fight. Training focuses mainly on attack, dodging and counter-attack, giving high importance to precision and discipline. Mestre Bimba also added moves from batuque, an old street fight game played by his father. He also may have incorporated and responded to moves from jujutsu and possibly other martial arts. Mestre Bimba extended the repertoire of capoeira, notably adding the martelo (a type of roundhouse kick) and a number of hand strikes. He established a formal training sequence. Initially, he also included some weapons training, but this was later de-emphasized. The traditions of roda, musical accompaniment, and the capoeira game are maintained in capoeira regional, putting into practice what is learned during training.

In the 1960s and 1970s, it was practiced by Grupo Senzala, who became the most influential capoeira group of their period. Grupo Senzala also drew from some training in shotokan karate as well as attention to Brazilian jiu-jitsu and Brazilian football. After the mid-1980s, there was an increased emphasis on anti-racism and diversity of practice, as well as greater activity and authority for women capoeiristas. In Bahia, Mestre Bimba's son, Mestre Nenel, continues to teach in his father's tradition. The regional style of capoeira has appeared in a number of martial arts films and influenced the methods of mixed martial arts.

== History ==
=== 1920s and 1930s ===
In the 1920s, capoeira in Bahia faced repression from the cavalry squadron of police chief Pedro de Azevedo Gordilho; this led to a more harmless dance version of the art form. Partly as a response to this domestication, capoeira regional began to take form in the 1920s, when Mestre Bimba met his future student, José Cisnando Lima. Both believed that capoeira was losing its martial side and concluded there was a need to re-strengthen and structure it. Bimba created his sequências de ensino (teaching combinations) and created capoeira's first teaching method. Advised by Cisnando, Bimba decided to call his style Luta Regional Baiana, as capoeira was still illegal at that time.

Bira Almeida contends that modern-day capoeira begins with Mestre Bimba's practice in the early 1930s. State repression of capoeira decreased after the military coup of Gétulio Vargas, who advocated a strategy of cultural populism. Mestre Bimba established a formal school in 1932, when the Bahia local government agreed to allow it; he developed capoeira regional, a reformed style including aspects of batuque, which he learned from his father, Luis Cândido Machado, and instituting training sequences. Batuque is an Afro-Bahian challenge dance, in which the practitioner tries to trip or topple an opponent. There is controversy regarding the question of whether Mestre Bimba also borrowed from non-Brazilian styles, such as jujutsu and boxing; he may have encountered these fighting styles from trips to Rio de Janeiro, or from students who had other fighting experiences. Novelist Jorge Amado claims that Mestre Bimba adapted catch wrestling and boxing as well as jujutsu. Mestre Bimba took part in many street fights and public matches, sometimes to establish his skills and sometimes for practical reasons; a news report of 1936 recounts that Mestre Bimba applied capoeira to defend himself and a young boy from police.

Capoeira regional has a formal means of instruction and emphasizes fighting skills. Training focuses mainly on attack, dodging and counter-attack, giving high importance to precision and discipline. Use of jumps or aerial acrobatics stay to a minimum, since one of its foundations is always keeping at least one hand or foot firmly attached to the ground. In the early years, Mestre Bimba tested new students by putting them in a headlock, testing endurance of discomfort. Mestre Bimba included in his teachings a curso de especialização or "specialization course", in which the pupils would be taught defenses against knives and guns, as well as the use of bladed weapons. Capoeira was legalized and promoted by the Brazilian state beginning in 1937, and became an official national sport under Vargas' government.

=== 1940s and 1950s ===
In the 1940s, capoeira fighters took part in public matches with practitioners of other martial arts, called vale tudo. Capoeira was traditionally male-dominated, but Mestre Bimba trained six women for an international festival in the mid-1940s. Ebony magazine published an article publicizing capoeira in the United States, in 1947. The magazine focuses on Mestre Bimba's school, reporting that he taught two versions of the practice, one focusing on self-defense and the other on athletic practice; the article also argues that most of Bahia's policemen had become students of Mestre Bimba's insititute. Mestre Bimba made many presentations of his new style; the best known took place in 1953 for the audience of Getúlio Vargas, after which the president declared that "Capoeira is the only truly national sport."

=== 1960s ===
Obligatory uniforms for capoeira groups became common practice in the 1960s. By the 1960s, capoeira regional had introduced the first ranking method in capoeira: calouro (freshman), formado (graduated) and formado especializado (specialist). After 1964, when a student completed a course, a special celebration ceremony occurred, ending with the teacher tying a silk scarf around the capoeirista's neck. Bira Almeida graduated from Mestre Bimba's school in 1959 and opened his own in 1962; his school aimed to include both regional and Angola styles. In 1964, Almeida created the Grupo Folclórico da Bahia, which integrated capoeira with theater and related Afro-Brazilian cultural practices, and toured throughout Brazil. The group toured Rio de Janeiro in 1966, and one of its performers established a new school in that city. In 1968, the Grupo Folclórico da Bahia won international prizes in Argentina, Ecuador, and Peru. In 1964, the Grupo Senzala also formed, initially by teenagers in Rio and subsequently incorporating students of Mestre Bimba. The group was primary young white men of the upper middle class; they also incorporated training and techniques of Shotokan karate, which had become popular in Rio. From 1967 to 1969, Golden Berimbau tournaments were held in Rio de Janeiro, all of three of which were won by the Grupo Senzala organization; Senzala practiced an athleticized and acrobatic form of capoeira regional. In 1968 and 1969, the first national meetings of mestres from all the regions of Brazil took place; the events were partly sponsored by the Brazilian Air Force. Capoeira regional spread throughout Brazil after the 1960s, tending to absorb other local variants.

=== 1970s and 1980s ===
The 1975 Capoeira Cup

In 1970, Mestre Bimba became discouraged by a lack of official support and moved from Bahia to Goías; he died in 1974. Initially, all practitioners of capoeira regional were students of Mestre Bimba, but following his death the method became widespread and replicated by a variety of new teachers. Rio and São Paulo became regional centers of capoeira, on par with Bahia. In 1972, the Brazilian government made capoeira an official sport and tried to establish official rules; however, these were not universally adopted. In the 1970s, capoeira was in conversation with other developments in athletics in Brazil, such as the Gracie family and Brazilian jiu-jitsu, as well as football in Brazil. Nestor Capoeira likely became the first to teach capoeira in Europe; first teaching at the London Contemporary Dance School in 1971, before touring European cities for three years. Jelon Vieira began teaching capoeira in New York City in 1975; he founded the Capoeira Foundation in the U.S. in 1976. Demonstrations by Vieira may have inspired the incorporation of some capoeira movements into breakdancing. Bira Almeida, a student of Mestre Bimba's, settled on the West Coast of the United States in 1979.

The Grupo Senzala, practicing regional, was the most influential capoeira style in the 1970s and 1980s. Mestre Camisa became a prominent member of the group in 1972. However, during the mid-1980s, capoeira Angola also became more prestigious, in tandem with a broader revival of Afro-Brazilian culture. In 1984, the First National Meeting of the Art of Capoeira took place at the Circo Voador, partly organized by the Senzala group. The meeting brought old masters together with younger talent, and presented a more experimental approach to the global future of capoeira. Since the mid-1980s, there has been an increasing emphasis on conscious anti-racism in capoeira culture. In the 1970s and 1980s, women became much more active participants in the capoeira community, in Brazil and globally. The first wave of female capoeira mestras appeared in the 1980s.

=== 1990s and after ===
In 1995, a capoeirista named Mestre Hulk knocked out a Brazilian jiu-jitsu fighter to win a vale tudo competition; this led to debate within the community regarding an increasing aggression in some forms of capoeira. Capoeira fights have, on occasion, resulted in severe injuries and even fatalities, as seen in Petrópolis in 1996. In this period, there was increasing visibility of capoeira in popular culture. In 1994, capoeira regional appeared in an American martial arts film, Only the Strong. The choreography for the film was done by Amen Santo. In addition, many of Wesley Snipes' action films include scenes involving capoeira, as he is trained in it. There was also increasing participation in capoeira by women throughout the 1990s, partly influenced by feminism in Brazil. In Bahia, Mestre Nenel, Mestre Bimba's son, continues to teach in his father's tradition.

Capoeira regional continued to affect mixed martial arts; in 2009, Brazilian fighter Marcus "Lelo" Aurélio (also known as Professor Barrãozinho), knocked out his opponent Keegan Marshall with a capoeira kick, a meia lua de compasso.

== Debate regarding authenticity ==
Capoeira regional was the first tradition of capoeira to achieve legitimacy and cultural acceptance in Brazil, and tended to absorb other local styles. Mestre Bimba presented his approach as an effective martial art, rather than a folkloric practice. As a response, Mestre Pastinha's capoeira Angola rejected its innovations and adopted an Afrocentric approach meant to preserve musicality and self-expression rather than the perceived overemphasis on fighting effectiveness and athleticism in the regional style. Capoeristas associated with the Angola tradition even characterized the regional tradition as "whitening" of capoeira. In particular, the style of Grupo Senzala became a uniform standard in the 1970s and this restricted creativity and play. Nestor Capoeira and Bira Almeida have argued against the thesis that Mestre Bimba distorted or betrayed the original capoeira. Nestor Capoeira argues that Mestre Bimba's emphasis on combat effectiveness is closer to capoeira as it was documented in 1835, generally thought to be a "pure" form. He views the Angola tradition's emphasis on authenticity and origins as an invented tradition. Interpreters and practitioners in the regional tradition are more likely to credit the multiculturalism of Brazil as a significant ingredient in the development of capoeira; for example, Nestor Capoeira describes capoeira as "a dance-fight, a game that is a mixture of boxing, tai-chi, samba, American music" as well as dances and instruments from different African regions. However, Nestor agrees that the Senzala style had become stultifying, and welcomes the greater diversity and emphasis on anti-racism adopted in the mid-1980s.

== As a game ==
Capoeira practitioners do not speak of "fighting" or "dancing" but rather of "playing" (jogar). Capoeira training requires the practice of musical instruments and songs as well as physical techniques and game-playing strategy. The berimbau is the primary instrument of capoeira, setting the rhythm for the game. Musical rhythms dictate different types of games; for example, the banguela rhythm calls for a low, tricky game, while the Iuna rhythm indicates more acrobatic movements, and São Bento grande demands speed and strength. Playing capoeira is both a game and a method of practicing the application of capoeira movements in simulated combat. While it can be played anywhere, is usually done in a roda (pronounced [ˈʁodɐ]). During the game most capoeira moves are used, but capoeiristas usually avoid punches or elbow strikes unless it is a very aggressive game. The game does not focus on knocking down or defeating opponents, but rather on body dialogue and highlighting skills.

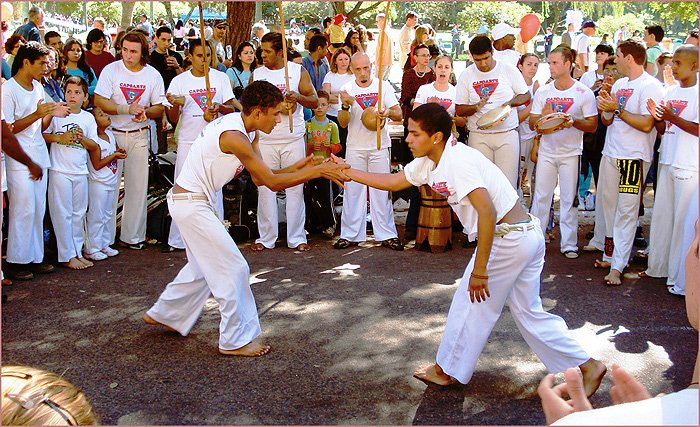
Capoeiristas in a roda (Porto Alegre, Brazil)

The roda is a circle formed by capoeiristas and capoeira musical instruments, where every participant sings the typical songs and claps their hands following the music. Two capoeiristas shake hands, enter the roda and play the game according to the style required by the musical rhythm. In the roda, capoeiristas perform various attacks and dodges; the game finishes when one of the musicians holding a berimbau determines it, when one of the capoeiristas decides to leave or call the end of the game, or when another capoeirista interrupts the game to start playing, either with one of the current players or with another capoeirista.

The batizado (lit. baptism) is a ceremonial roda where new students receive recognition as capoeiristas and earn their first graduation. More experienced students may also be evaluated and move up in rank. Students enter the roda against a high-ranked capoeirista (such as a teacher or master) and normally the game ends with the student being taken down. In some cases the more experienced capoeirista can judge the takedown unnecessary. Following the batizado the new graduation, generally in the form of a cord, is given. Traditionally, the batizado is the moment when the new practitioner gets or formalizes their apelido (nickname). This tradition was created back when capoeira practice was considered a crime. To avoid having problems with the law, capoeiristas would present themselves in the capoeira community only by their nicknames. In some cases, the nicknames have overtones of mockery, but they also carry affection and pride. Nicknaming was initially uncommon for female capoeiristas, although it has become typical.

While capoeira is a game, it can be very intense; combat capoeira, often referred to as rough capoeira (capoeira dura), places a primary emphasis on combat. It is commonly observed in street rodas, and sometimes even in graduations within certain groups. In the words of Nanica, a capoeira teacher:

I think beating (pancadaria) is good. I learned capoeira being beaten up and I like a rough game, heavy game. Sometimes, when I receive a kick that breaks my mouth, my nose, I even like it because I am learning. Beating is important in capoeira. Pancadaria is not violence.

Professor Barrãozinho from Axé Capoeira performing a meia-lua de compasso against Keegan Marshall.

Several capoeira fighters have gained national reputation, including Mestre King Kong from Salvador, Mestre Maurão from São Paulo, and King from Rio de Janeiro; they advocate for capoeiristas to be skilled in playing intense games to ensure that the art retains its combat effectiveness. In the tradition of Mestre Bimba, contemporary capoeira fighters have expanded their training by incorporating various martial arts disciplines, including jujutsu, boxing, and taekwondo. Brazilian mixed martial arts champions like Marco Ruas acknowledge the significance of capoeira in their training. The use of capoeira techniques in free-style competitions shows to what extent the art still provides essential fighting skills.

Capoeira Regional showcases rapid, acrobatic kicks, often appealing to younger participants. Most regional capoeira games are brief, lasting a maximum of two minutes before participants switch out.

== Techniques ==
Capoeira regional expanded the repertoire of capoeira techniques. According to Raimundo Cesar Alves de Almeida, earlier capoeira had only nine basic attacks, but regional practiced 120 during Mestre Bimba's lifetime.

Capoeira is often said to be a martial art disguised as a dance. It is fast and versatile; the lower body kicks, sweeps and takes down aggressors, while the upper body assists those movements and occasionally attacks as well. It features a series of complex positions and body postures that should flow, strike, dodge and move with characteristic unpredictability and versatility. The fluidity of the movements requires mobility and flexibility. Capoeira movements are generally circular, rather than striking head on.

Simple animation depicting part of the ginga

The ginga (literally "rocking back and forth"; "to swing") is the fundamental movement in capoeira, important both for attacking and defending oneself. It has two main objectives: one is to keep the capoeirista in motion, preventing them from being a still and easy target; and the other is to mislead, fool or trick the opponent, leaving them open to attack. Most capoeira attacks are made with the legs; there are several kicks, such as meia lua de frente (an arc kick), armada (a spin-kick), queixada (an inverse arc kick), chapa de costas (a back push kick), bênção (a front push kick), and meia lua de compasso (a crouch and spinning reverse kick). Capoeira regional also includes a martelo ("hammer") kick, similar to a roundhouse kick; this is distinct from Angola tradition, which views it as an incorporation of other martial arts. In addition, capoeiristas apply takedowns such as the rasteira (leg sweeps), tesoura, arrastão, boca de calça, and vingativa. Capoeira regional also includes hand strikes such as galopante, godeme, and cutelo. The head strike (cabeçada) is an important counter-attack move.

Defense relies on avoiding an attack using evasive moves, instead of blocking it. Dodges include cocorinha and resistência (two types of defensive crouch), queda de quatro (a defensive fall backwards on all fours), and esquiva (head and torso movement). A series of rolls and acrobatics, such as the cartwheels called aú or the transitional position called negativa, allows the capoeirista to quickly overcome a takedown or a loss of balance, and to position themselves around the aggressor to attack. This combination of attacks, defense and mobility is what gives capoeira its perceived "fluidity" and choreography-like style.

=== Recognition of proficiency ===
Individual capoeristas generally strive to develop their own style, within the tradition they are trained. Nestor Capoeira teaches:

It is a task, and a lonely one, to find and develop your own style, breaking with the “correct” way of playing that you learned from your teacher, who many times presents himself as “owner of the truth.” But this can be done after one has experience and an idea of what capoeira is … maybe after ten or fifteen years of practice.

A capoeira movement (aú fechado) (click for animation)

While capoeira regional introduced the first ranking method in capoeira; traditionally, it had three levels: calouro (freshman), formado (graduated), and formado especializado (specialist). However, capoeira has never maintained general agreement on a ranking system in the regional tradition. Bira Almeida speaks of distinctions among discípulos (people who pursue capoeira as a supplementary activity to their general lifestyle), contra-mestres (capoeiristas who have achieved considerable proficiency and who instruct others in the tradition), and mestres (who have devoted their lives to capoeira). Some masters have established a system for their particular tradition. The most common system uses colored ropes, called corda or cordão, tied around the waist. The highest rank in capoeira is mestre or mestra (master), but different schools and traditions have distinct criteria for giving this title; in the 1960s, some young men took on the title when they were in their twenties, but it is now much more common to require a mestre to be at least 40 years old (or even 60 years old in some schools), with 25 years of capoeira playing as well as significant accomplishments in teaching it.

== Music ==
Music sets the tempo and style of game that is to be played within the roda; rhythms (toques) are controlled by an instrument called a berimbau, which has become the symbol of capoeira. The second most important instrument in capoeira is a pandeiro, a type of tambourine. Capoeira instruments are disposed in a row called bateria. Traditionally, it includes berimbaus, pandeiros, atabaques, and an agogô; the format may vary depending on the capoeira group's traditions or the roda style. The berimbau is the leading instrument, determining the tempo and style of the music and game played; the other instruments must follow the berimbau's rhythm, free to vary and improvise a little, depending upon the capoeira group's musical style. The capoeiristas change their playing style significantly following the toque of the berimbau, which sets the game's speed, style and aggressiveness. Capoeira regional is guided by one berimbau.

Many of the songs are sung in a call and response format while others are in the form of a narrative. The lyrics that capoeiristas sing are stories about the beautiful history of capoeira, mythic legends, and other fun playful tales. The songs are sung in Portuguese and have a poetic melody to them, while showcasing the true intensity and power of the game. There are three basic kinds of songs in capoeira: The ladainha, corrido, and quadra. The ladainha is a narrative solo sung at the beginning of a roda; the players first observe while this is being sung. A second part of the ladainha is answered by the chorus; the corrido is a one- or two-verse song, first sung by a soloist and then answered; while the quadra is a song where the same verse is repeated four times, with chorus responses. The topics of capoeira songs can include a wide variety of topics, such as a historical fact, a famous capoeirista, trivial life facts, or hidden messages for players. Improvisation can be important; while singing a song, the main singer can change the music's lyrics to address something taking place in or outside the roda.

== See also ==
- Capoeira Angola
- History of capoeira
