= Capoeira toques =

Berimbau rhythms accompanying the Brazilian martial art

In the game of capoeira, toques are the rhythms played on the berimbau. Many toques are associated with a specific game (i.e. style and speed of play), although organizations differ on how to play each toque. Capoeira toques have their roots in African rhythmic music, which was modified and further developed among the slaves of Brazil.

== Important toques ==
Some of the more important toques are described below, including traditional toques, and those created or popularised by Mestre Bimba, who was responsible for significant developments to modern capoeira.

=== Notation ===
= Open berimbau tone. The arame is struck with the dobrão open and the cabaça away from the stomach for a low note, or the dobrão pressing firmly for a high note. In this notation, notes that are unfilled are played unmuted rather than representing a half note.
= Muted berimbau note (cabaça is held against the body).
= A buzz (strike the arame with the dobrão resting lightly on the arame and the cabaça against the body)
Double and single eighth notes. An eighth note is 1/2 a beat.
= A slur (press the dobrão against the arame without striking with the other hand)
= A quarter note rest (1 beat)
= An eighth note rest (1/2 a beat)
= Shows the basic pulse underneath the bar for comparison. Four boxes = 1 beat

== The Traditional Toques ==
=== Angola ===
Considered the oldest and most traditional toque. Used for the Angola game, a slow performance where players demonstrate balance and corporal expression. Used with the São Bento Pequeno toque. Tempo can range from slow to moderately fast.

Images are given below to illustrate the structure of this common toque.

The basic:

Some common variations played by the viola:

=== São Bento Pequeno ===
Also known as São Bento Pequeno or Inverted Angola (because it replaces the high note of the Angola toque with the low and vice versa). A close, fast game. São Bento Pequeno is also sometimes played as a contra-toque (an inversion the gunga) by the medio berimbau.

Variations are the same as above, but with High and Low tones swapped.

=== São Bento Grande ===
Also known as São Bento Grande de Angola (to disambiguate from São Bento Grande da Regional created by Mestre Bimba), it is a rhythm played for a very fast game played with ample movements. Leg sweeps and take downs are common in this game. The toque is identical to São Bento Pequeno, except that the 1/4 note pause is replaced by an additional solto note (i.e. the open note struck below the level of the coin) and the tempo is faster.

=== Apanha a Laranja no Chão Tico Tico ===
A toque used for the not often seen 'money', game where the players try to pick up a coin purse placed in the center of the roda with their mouths, the melody imitates the corrido Santa Maria, Mãe de Deus. The corrido Apanha Laranja no Chão Tico Tico (não pega com a mão, só com pé ou com bico) gives general rule for the game: use your mouth and feet, not your hands.

=== Cavalaria ===
Originally used to alert players that the police were coming, the toque imitates the galloping of horses (and some say it sounds like a police siren)

=== Samba de Roda ===
This rhythm comes from the traditional Sambas de Roda of Bahia and is perhaps the oldest of the toques listed. It is used as a toque variation for the berimbau viola, as well as for a post-roda celebration.

== Toques created and played by Mestre Bimba ==
=== São Bento grande de Bimba ===
"São Bento Grande de Regional" or simply "Regional" is a fast, explosive rhythm, considered the staple toque of true Regional Rodas.

=== Iúna ===
Iúna is an old viola guitar rhythm used in the sambas of the Recôncavo, Bahia. Bimba, himself an accomplished master of the viola de samba, brought iuna into capoeira as a rhythm on the berimbau. He said that was an imitation of the Iúna bird's song - of the male calling and the female responding. A medium-paced and graceful game, it is played traditionally by "formados" (graduated students) at the end of the roda. Throws (baloes), in which partners throw each other and must land on their feet, are inserted within the game.

=== Benguela ===
Banguela is a slow rhythm created by Mestre Bimba. It is a "jogo de floreios", not in the sense of acrobatics like in Capoeira Contemporânea rodas, but in the sense that both players assist each other in creating a beautiful and flowing game that demonstrates their skills. It tends to be played close and low to the ground, since the rhythm is slow. This toque has been nicknamed "the game of the toothless".

=== Idalina ===
A slow to moderate rhythm, Idalina was also created by Mestre Bimba, and is often heard in regional rodas. Players tend to play both "up" and "down". "Idalina Compassada" is slower-paced, while "Idalina" is slightly faster-paced.

=== Amazonas ===
Amazonas is a rhythm created by Mestre Bimba. It has no traditionally-associated game, but is sometimes played during graduation rodas.

=== Santa Maria ===
Mestre Bimba's Santa Maria is different from the Santa Maria in Capoeira Angola. It does not have a traditionally-associated game but is played at a medium-pace. According to Mestre Nenel, Mestre Bimba's son, it is unclear whether Mestre Bimba created this rhythm.

=== Cavalaria ===
Mestre Bimba strove to preserve the cavalaria rhythm in honour of the past when capoeiristas used it to warn each other of the approaching police or cavalry, but it is not played during classes and rodas.

=== Hino da Capoeira Regional: (Capoeira Regional Anthem) ===
The anthem of Capoeira Regional is a rhythm created by Mestre Bimba. Traditionally, it is played at the end of classes and rodas, as participants stand silently and respectfully in a circle as the toque is played

=== Capoeira Contemporânea versions of Mestre Bimba's toques* ===
These are modern versions of Mestre Bimba's toques and does not represent how he played them in his rodas.

=== Iuna ===
It usually switches between one of a set of variations and a repeated common measure.

Phrase 1:
Phrase 2:
Phrase 3:
Phrase 4:

=== Amazonas ===
Three Versions Below:

== Other toques ==
=== Miudinho ===
Created by Mestre Suassuna. It is a fluid, low, fast game with many circular movements and without sweeps and hits. There is only sometimes clapping or singing.

Mestre Suassuna: "The game of miudinho is generating controversy because it is being misinterpreted. People are thinking it's a new capoeira, and it's nothing like that. I simply rescued an older capoeira, modernized the manner of playing it, changed the sequences... the name miudinho arose because I was observing that capoeiristas were playing very distant from each other and in our time we played very close; thus, I said to people, 'I want the game more minute, closer, play very tiny.' Then, I created a toque on the berimbau. Miudinho is not a new capoeira, it's a different manner to display capoeira. Just like the games of Iuna and São Bento Grande exist, the game of miudinho exists."
