= Batizado =

A batizado (literally "baptism" in Portuguese, and borrowed from the religious tradition) is normally an annual event for a capoeira group in a region or country. The practice originates from capoeira regional, but has been widely used by capoeira contemporânea groups.

In capoeira regional, the tradition of the batizado is simply the first time a new student plays capoeira to the sound of the berimbau. In the batizado, the new student will play with a more advanced student, who takes care of the beginner, and helps them to develop their capoeira game. The batizado welcomes new students into the school and strengthens community bonds.

Mestre Bimba, a founder of modern capoeira, recognized the central importance of relationships in people's lives, and he worked hard to nurture these connections, with the aim to help people develop into happy, whole individuals. In capoeira contemporânea, batizados have developed in different directions with their own traditions, and while this is just as valid, it is so far from Bimba's creation that the only connection is in the name and not in its rituals.

In capoeira contemporânea, batizados are large events and are very important for the group organizing them. It is the point in the year where the new members will be baptized officially into the group and receive their first cords and where the other members, depending on their progress, will receive a new one. A typical batizado will take several days and consist of workshops, the batizado itself and a troca de cordas. Often many groups from more than one region will attend a batizado for other groups. This allows for development of the game by contact with other players, teachers and styles.

Normally, the mestre of the group must be present during the proceedings, but historically this is not required.

In many schools, students are baptized by the floor, that is, they play against higher level capoeiristas and are subsequently taken down by a rasteira. This is meant to signify a continual process of humility and improvement in the game. This ritual of giving a rasteira to the beginner is of modern creation, and is not a part of the original batizado ceremony that was created by Bimba.

== Troca de cordas ==
Troca de cordas translates literally as the "changing of the cords". The cords signify the level of a capoeirista. During the troca de cordas, some capoeiristas will receive a new corda before or after a game played against a mestre (master) in which they have to show their advancement and earn the right to wear the new corda. The color schemes for the levels vary from group to group.
