= Agenor Moreira Sampaio =

Brazilian capoeira master

Mestre Sinhozinho
- Born: Agenor Moreira Sampaio; 1891; Santos, Brazil
- Died: 1962 (aged 70–71); Rio de Janeiro, Brazil
- Occupations: Teacher of capoeira, physical education teacher
- Years active: 1930–1962 (32 years of teaching)
- Parent(s): José Moreira (father); Ana I. de Moreira (mother)

Agenor Moreira Sampaio, commonly known as Mestre Sinhozinho (1891–1962), was a mestre or master practitioner of the Afro-Brazilian martial art of capoeira. He was the main exponent of the fighting-oriented style known as capoeira carioca.

== Biography ==
=== Early life and training ===
Sampaio was born in 1891 in Santos, Brazil. Some sources name his second surname as Ferreira, but the rest of his life is well documented. He was one of the eight children of Brazilian military officer and politician José Moreira, who descended from Francisco Manoel da Silva. An avid athlete, Agenor trained formally in boxing, savate, Greco-Roman wrestling and arm wrestling since his childhood, and also learned capoeira in the docks of Santos.

When his family moved to Rio de Janeiro in 1908, he became a neighbor to fighter José Floriano "Zeca" Peixoto, son of politician Floriano Peixoto, who trained him further in capoeira. Sampaio might have also witnessed the famous vale tudo fight between capoeirista Francisco da Silva Ciríaco and jiu-jitsu fighter Sada Miyako, in which Ciríaco knocked his opponent out. Sampaio started training the local style of pernada or capoeira carioca, an aggressive, violent variation strongly associated to policemen and gangsters alike, and eventually became a master of the art, receiving the name of Mestre Sinhozinho (Sinhozinho meaning "Little Mister").

He had his first national exposure as a fighter in 1917, when he accepted a challenge by wrestling champion João Baldi to avoid being taken down for five minutes. Sinhozinho passed the challenge with shocking ease, lasting an impressive total of 40 minutes against the champion, although the money prize was revealed to be non-existent because the promoter did not expect the challenge to be broken. He also worked as a teacher, being present in Mario Aleixo's capoeira school in 1920.

=== Carioca school ===
Like his contemporaneous Mestre Bimba, Sinhozinho opened a school in 1930 to teach capoeira carioca to wealthy middle class citizens. However, his carioca school was not based on a single place, as Sinhozinho taught in several sport clubs and terrains borrowed from his benefactors, usually around the rich neighborhood of Ipanema beach. Also, unlike most capoeira mestres, Sinhozinho favored combat effectiveness over artistic expression, ditching entirely the art's music and rituals and mixing it liberally with wrestling and other fighting styles. It has been proposed Mestre Bimba decided to emphasize the most traditional aspects of capoeira as an answer to pragmatic, combative variations like those taught by Sinhozinho and Anibal "Zuma" Burlamaqui. Nevertheless, he is credited with developing the practice of capoeira in Rio de Janeiro. He was also a hand-to-hand instructor of the Polícia Especial created by President of Brazil Getúlio Vargas.

Moreira approached capoeira in a scientific way, tailoring his training methods individually for every apprentice. He would even build his own training gear and tools to drill the art's movements, and subjected his students to heavy weight training. He modified the traditional ginga, making it more similar to boxing footwork, and also introduced techniques from wrestling and judo, especially through his partnership with judo teacher Augusto Cordeiro. Sinhozinho also cultivated the psychological aspect of self-defense, instructing his students to laugh at their attackers before fighting in order to confuse them and dissipate their own fear. Finally, capoeira carioca also taught the use of weapons like the sardinha or santo christo (razors) and the petropolis (canes, sometimes tricked), and among the few traditions it preserved there might be an ancient combat game similar to batuque named roda de pernada, where capoeiristas would exchange leg blows.

Sinhozinho was known himself as an excellent athlete and fighter. Aside from his mentioned challenge with João Baldi, he was reportedly unbeaten in arm wrestling, and he often showed his trainees how to lift heavy weights by doing it himself even at his advanced age. There's also an anecdote about how, upon witnessing a donkey being run over and left agonizing on Arpoador street, Moreira put the animal out of his misery with a single move. However, as he never created a standardized way of teaching, his fighting style died with his own passing in 1960. Sinhozinho ended up being more influential as a physical education teacher whose training methods benefitted many Brazilian athletes benefitted of, like future judo champion Rudolf de Otero Hermanny, wrestlers Reinaldo Lima and Paulo Paiva, athletes Paulo Amaral and Paulo Azeredo, musician Antonio Carlos Jobim and future Olympic Committee president Sylvio de Magalhães Padilha.

=== Challenge on the Regional school ===
In February 1949, Sinhozinho launched a challenge to the rival capoeira regional school led by Mestre Bimba, who was touring São Paulo. Bimba and his students had been forced to work only exhibition matches and were eager for real fighting (pra valer), so they quickly accepted to travel to Rio de Janeiro to answer the challenge. A two-day fighting event was hosted by the Federação Metropolitana de Pugilismo in the Estádio Carioca, including also a team of catch wrestlers who had similarly challenged the Regional academy.

Two bouts were fought between the two capoeira schools. In the first match on April 2, Sinhozinho's apprentice Luiz "Cirandinha" Pereira Aguiar fought Bimba's student Jurandir (also a practitioner of judo), knocking him out in the first round with a body kick. Jurandir claimed it to be a low blow, but as witnesses and the ring doctor stated otherwise, the result was kept. In the second on April 7, 17-year-old Carioca fighter Rudolf Hermanny defeated Regional student Fernando Rodrigues Perez in two minutes, dominating the bout and eventually injuring Perez's arm with a kick. It's said Bimba was so impressed that he learned some movements he saw in the fight to assimilate them into his own style.

=== Challenge on the Gracie family ===
In 1953, Sinhozinho next challenged the Gracie family, inviting them to send two of their Brazilian jiu-jitsu representatives to a vale tudo charity event in the Vasco da Gama stadium on March 17. His own carioca fighters would be again Hermanny and Cirandinha, coached by his usual judo consultant Augusto Cordeiro, while the Gracies sent Guanair Vial Gomes and Carlson Gracie.

The first match pitted Hermanny against the gi-clad Gomes, who was significantly heavier and had a wrestling background. The Gracie fighter dominated the first minutes, taking dominant position on the ground and executing ground and pound, but Hermanny escaped to his feet. After removing his gi jacket, Gomes took him down again, but the Carioca now started defending actively from his guard with punches, knifehand strikes and heel kicks to the back, capitalizing on his superior conditioning to wear Gomes down. After one hour and 10 minutes, with Gomes heavily battered and a fresher Hermanny looking to finish him off on the feet, the former's cornerman Carlos Gracie called for the match to be stopped and ruled a draw. Although Hermanny and the crowd wanted to continue to a finish, the judges eventually acquiesced to Gracie's demands. The audience loudly chanted for Hermanny through and after the affair.

The second bout had Cirandinha fight Carlson Gracie, featuring almost the opposite narrative. Dominating the early moments, the stronger Cirandinha punished Carlson standing with a variety of strikes and kicks, followed by a hard throw and a heavy hook that almost finished Gracie. However, Carlson managed to survive the beating, and gradually took over the fight with hit-and-run strikes over Cirandinha, who had become fatigued noticeably quickly. The jiu-jitsu fighter pulled guard and achieved dominant position, from which he landed punches and elbow strikes and looked for an armlock. Although Cirandinha did not concede the hold, his corner threw the towel due to his damage and sapped resistance, declaring Carlson the winner to the crowd's cheers.

Praising the fights, the press considered the event to be a highlight for both schools. Newspaper O Popular called both winners "impressive" ("Rudolf Hermanny e Carlson Gracie -- Impressionantes!"), while magazine O Cruzeiro proclaimed, "brave men's blood soaked a concrete square in the Vasco estadium" ("O Sangue dos Valentes Ensopou a Quadra de Cimento do Estádio do Vasco").

=== Clash with Arturo Emídio ===
In June 1953, Sinhozinho's school was challenged by Artur Emídio de Oliveira, Capoeirista Regional from Bahia and a popular vale tudo fighter himself. Due to the ideological clash between Emídio's traditional capoeira and Sinhozhinho's utilitarian version, there was anticipation for a fight, so a bout between Emídio and usual Carioca fighter Hermanny was slated to be fought on June 29 in the Palácio de Aluminio. It was disputed under Burlamaqui's capoeira rules, only including a modification that allowed groundwork, and it featured Carlos and Hélio Gracie as spectators.

Hermanny controlled the first round, landing roundhouse kicks and palm strikes while defending with a boxing guard, which forced Emídio to take refuge on the ground. From there Emídio attempted kicks and rasteiras, managing to take Hermanny to the ground as well with a rabo de arraia, but the Carioca answered to this strategy by holding his legs, circling him and throwing stomps to the face and chest when possible.

At the second round, Hermanny came with increased aggression and knocked Emídio down several times with kicks, after which he landed his own rasteira and timed a decisive stomp on Emídio's face while the latter was getting up. The Carioca fighter then punished the stunned Bahiano with strikes and a throw, driving referee Jayme Ferreira to stop the match before Emídio was fully rendered KO. Despite the victory, there was the perception among critics that Hermanny had fought while limiting himself in order not to finish the fight too early, which was corroborated by his coach Cordeiro.

== Death ==
Sinhozinho died in 1962. His cultural legacy is obscure, but he has been considered in modern times the mainstay of capoeira in Rio de Janeiro. He was one of the first to popularize capoeira as a legal, sanitized art before Mestre Bimba.

== Bibliography ==
- Capoeira, Nestor (2012). Capoeira: Roots of the Dance-Fight-Game. North Atlantic Books. ISBN 978-15-839463-7-4.
- Green, Thomas A.; Svinth, Joseph R. (2010). Martial Arts of the World: An Encyclopedia of History and Innovation [2 volumes]: An Encyclopedia of History and Innovation. ABC-Clio. ISBN 978-15-988424-4-9.
- Lacé Lopes, André Luiz (2015). A capoeiragem no Rio de Janeiro, primeiro ensaio : Sinhozinho e Rudolf Hermanny. Editorial Europa. ISBN 978-85-900795-2-1.
- Röhrig Assunção, Matthias (2005). Capoeira: A History of an Afro-Brazilian Martial Art. Psychology Press. ISBN 978-07-146503-1-9.
- Silva, Elton; Correa, Eduardo (2020). Muito antes do MMA: O legado dos precursores do Vale Tudo no Brasil e no mundo. ISBN 979-8615504471.
- Taylor, Gerard (2007). Capoeira: The Jogo de Angola from Luanda to Cyberspace, Volume Two. Blue Snake Books. ISBN 978-15-839418-3-6.

== See also ==
- Anibal Burlamaqui
- Capoeira carioca
