= Grupo Senzala =

Grupo Senzala was the most famous capoeira group in Brazil, from the mid-1960s to the mid-1980s. It strongly influenced the teaching methods of capoeira and the style of the game.

Modern Senzala is a result of the Senzala Group of the 1970s.

== History ==
Senzala Group was strongly influenced by Bimba’s work. One of the factors contributing to Senzala's success in 1960s Rio was the socio-economic background of its members. They were from the upper middle class, which afforded them local connections and a higher social status compared to the capoeiristas from Bahia who had relocated to São Paulo.

At the height of its popularity from 1967 to 1971, rodas were held weekly in the Cosme Velho neighborhood. A diversity of styles existed within the group then. This Senzala style strongly influenced the whole of capoeira in Brazil during the 1970s and 1980s.

Senzala was and still is one of the most interesting forms of working in a group I have experienced. Among the corda-vermelhas there were some with a dictatorial mentality, and others who were complete anarchists; some gave all their energy without thinking about money, and others were like an adding machine; there were the "straight arrows" who did not drink a single beer, and the "freaks" who went out and got wasted every night in Rio's bohemian underworld. There was a bit of everything, with the only thing in common a deep passion for the game and love towards the group we had created. A group without a boss, without written rules or norms, without bureaucracy.… And it worked and is still working.

— Nestor Capoeira

In 1974, the Senzala group splintered, leading to the number of students grew significantly. Subsequently, the "red cords" (master practitioners) periodically convened. They adhered to the same uniform, grading system, teaching approach, and all operated under the name Senzala.

== Literature ==
- Capoeira, Nestor (2002). Capoeira: Roots of the Dance-Fight-Game. Blue Snake Books. ISBN 978-1-58394-637-4.
