= Nascimento Grande =

Nascimento Grande was a capoeira fighter from 19th century Recife. He disappeared from public life in the early nineteen hundreds.

== Literature ==
- Capoeira, Nestor (2007). The Little Capoeira Book. Blue Snake Books. ISBN 9781583941980.
- Lima, I. M. de F. (2011). Adama e Nascimento Grande: valentes do Recife da Primeira República. Cadernos De Estudos Sociais, 22(1)
