= Bira Almeida =

Brazilian folklorist

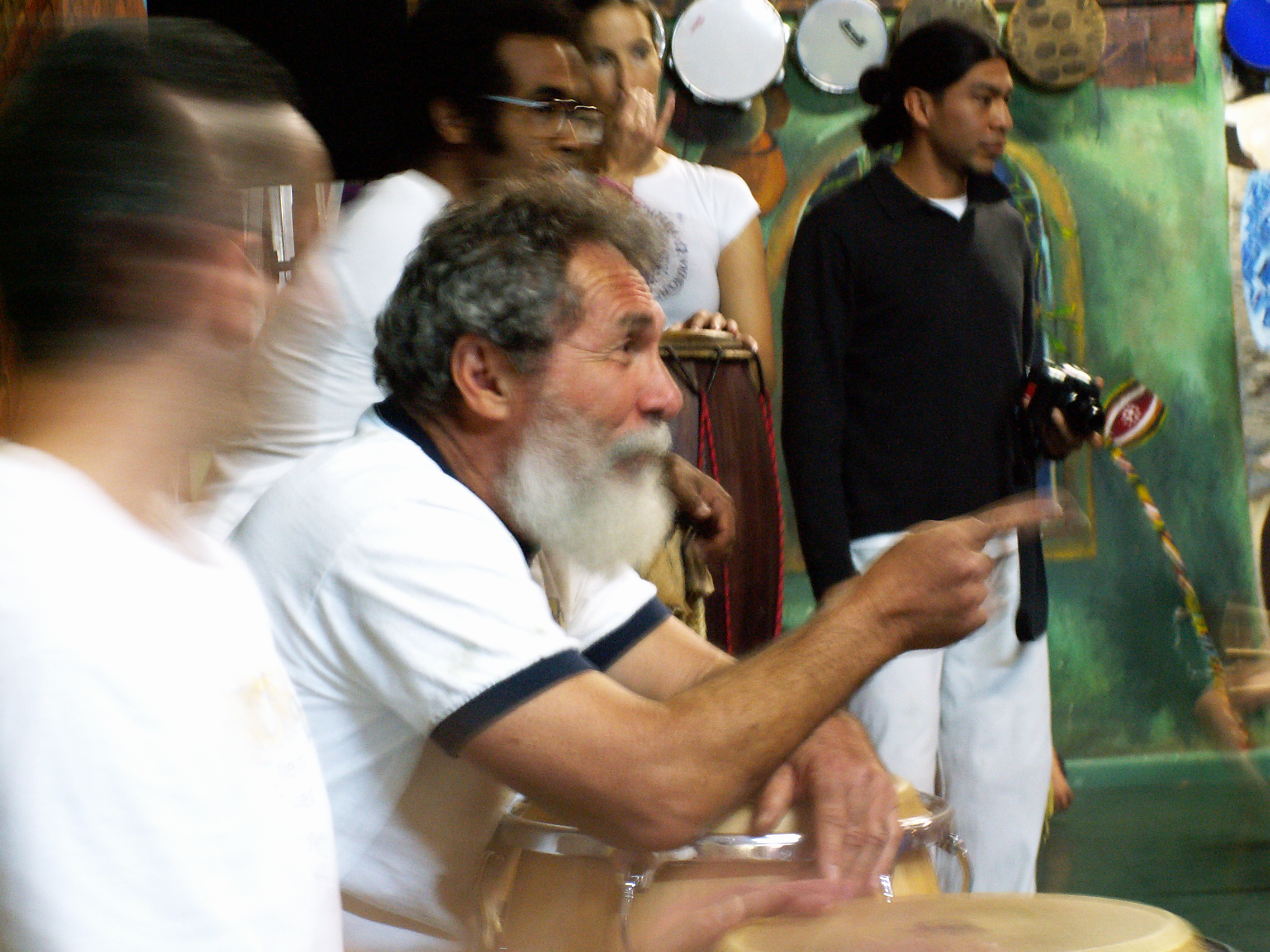
Mestre Acordeon teaching at the Capoeira Arts Cafe in Berkeley, California in the spring of 2005

Ubirajara (Bira) Guimarães Almeida (born 1943), known as Mestre Acordeon, is a native of Salvador, Bahia, Brazil, and a mestre of the Brazilian martial art Capoeira.

He has been active for fifty years as a teacher, performer, musician, organizer, author, and researcher into the origins, traditions, political connotations, and contemporary trends of Capoeira. Mestre Acordeon has traveled extensively to promote Capoeira outside Brazil.

== Biography ==
Acordeon was a student of Mestre Bimba in the late 1950s, and began teaching Capoeira himself in the early 1960s. In 1966, he founded the Grupo Folclorico da Bahia that performed the show Vem Camará: Histórias de Capoeira in the Teatro Jovem in Rio de Janeiro. He won three Brazilian Capoeira National Championships in the 1970s.

At the end of 1978 Mestre Acordeon came to the United States and began teaching Capoeira in the West Coast. He was one of the first Capoeira teachers on the West Coast of the US and also initiated projects and partnerships with US universities.

Mestre Acordeon maintains the United Capoeira Association (UCA) with several associated schools. He created the Capoeira Arts Foundation in Berkeley, California which sponsors UCA and Projeto Kirimurê, a social program for children in the neighborhood of Itapoã in Salvador, Bahia, Brazil.

At the age of 70, on Labor Day 2013, he, his wife Suellen Einarsen also known as Mestra Suelly and nine of his disciples embarked on a 14,000 miles bicycle journey from Berkeley to his home town of Salvador de Bahia in Brazil. Their purpose was to raise funds and awareness for Projeto Kirimurê via making a documentary and a music CD about Capoeira's development in the Americas and about the year long journey. At www.b2bjogacapoeira.com you can find a trailer of the so far completed work.

Mestre Acordeon is currently active in Brazil and internationally as a Capoeira teacher. His classes attract Brazilian students as well as international students who travel to Brazil to study with him.

== Works ==
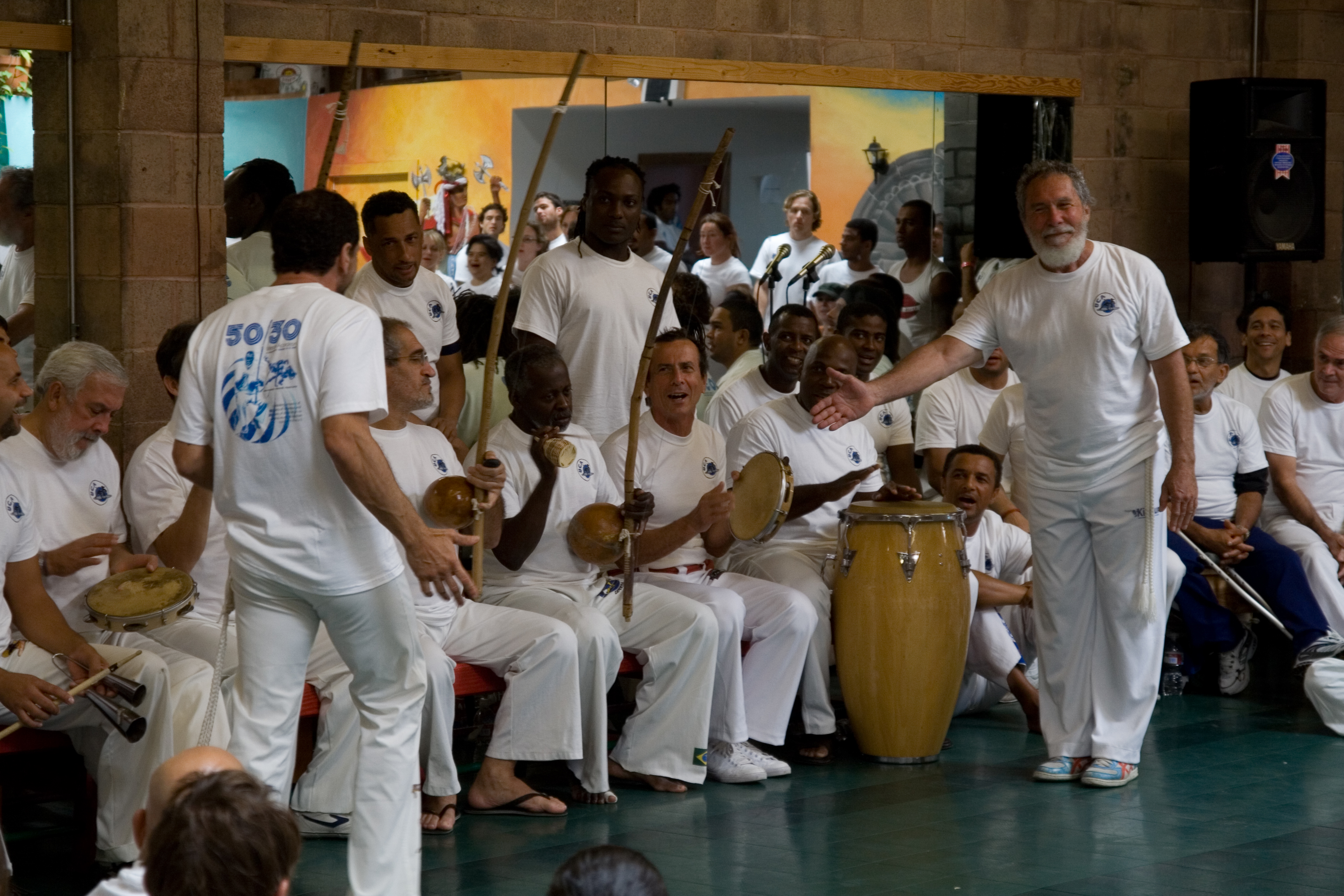
Mestre Acordeon with capoeiristas

Acordeon has recorded 9 CDs, and produced 3 DVDs. He is also the author of articles and books about Capoeira, including:

- Agua de Beber, Camará: A bate Papo de Capoeira,
- Capoeira Arts Café: An Academia de Capoeira.
- Capoeira: A Brazilian Art Form

== Recognition ==
He has received honors in support of his practice, teaching, and research of Capoeira. Among them, in the Fall of 1994, he became the first "artist" to receive the Tinker Visiting Professorship at the University of Wisconsin–Madison. In 2008, in recognition of his thirty years of continuous work on the West Coast, the City of Berkeley proclaimed 18 October as Mestre Acordeon Day.
