= Manuel dos Reis Machado =

Brazilian capoeira master

Mestre Bimba
- O rei da Capoeira
- Born: Manoel dos reis Machado; November 23, 1900; Salvador, Bahia, Brazil
- Died: February 5, 1974 (aged 73); Goiânia, Goiás, Brazil
- Occupations: Creator of capoeira regional, teacher of capoeira, musician, educator
- Years active: 1918–74 (56 years of teaching)
- Parent(s): Luiz Cândido Machado (father); Maria Martinha do Bonfim (mother)
- Relatives: Manoel Nascimento Machado (Mestre Nenel) (son); Marinalva Nascimento Machado (Dona Nalvinha) (daughter)
- Website: http://www.mestrebimbafundacao.blogspot.com/

Manuel dos Reis Machado, commonly called Mestre Bimba (Portuguese pronunciation: [ˈmɛstɾi ˈbĩbɐ]; November 23, 1899 or 1900 – February 5, 1974), was a Brazilian capoeira mestre and the founder of the capoeira regional style. He was initially a street fighter and learned the batuque style from his father. Subsequently, he learned traditional capoeira; in the 1910s and 1920s, he reformed it into his own style, called capoeira regional. He eventually established an institutional method for teaching capoeira, and helped to legitimize it in the eyes of Brazilian society. He pursued a friendly rivalry with Mestre Pastinha, who advocated a more traditional style under the name capoeira Angola.

== Early life ==
Manoel dos Reis Machado was born to Luiz Cândido Machado and Maria Martinha do Bonfim on 23 November 1900 (according to Matthias Röhrig Assunção) or 1899 (according to Bira Almeida) in the neighbourhood of Engenho Velho, in Salvador. He was one of 25 children born to the couple. The nickname "Bimba", whose literal meaning is "phallus", resulted from a bet between his mother and the midwife during his birth. His mother bet that he was going to be a girl and the midwife bet he would be a boy; after the delivery, the midwife confirmed he was a boy by pointing at his bimba. In the context of Brazil, "Bimba" also meant "beating".

He worked as a carpenter, dockworker, and day laborer. He started learning capoeira when he was 12 years old, with an African boat commander called Bentinho. He had previously learned techniques of batuque, a related fighting-dance, from his father, Luis Cândido Machado. As a young man, he had the nickname Três Pancadas, meaning "three blows", because this was said to be the number of his punches necessary to knock down an opponent.

== 1910s and 1920s ==
Bimba was trained in traditional capoeira. He reformed capoeira primarily in response to Burlamaqui and Sinhôzinho's attempts to strip it of music and African traditions, and transform it into a mere set of bodily techniques. He was also dissatisfied with the capoeira of his time because of its emphasis on rituals and ineffective kicks.

At 18, Bimba felt that capoeira had lost all its efficacy as a martial art and an instrument of resistance, becoming a folkloric activity reduced to nine movements. It was then that Bimba started to restore movements from the old capoeira (later known as Angola), added movements from an extinct African fighting style called batuque – a type of martial art that he learned from his father (of which his father was a champion), as well as introducing movements created by himself. Bimba was the first to create a method of teaching to help facilitate learning because, until then, capoeira was only learned by watching and participating in the roda. Bimba first named his style Luta Regional de Bahia (Regional Fight of Bahia), which was later simplified to capoeira regional.

It also has been theorized that Bimba received influence by other martial arts when adding and perfecting movements to the capoeira repertoire. He is known to have studied the method of capoeira teachers like Mestre Sinhozinho, Mario Aleixo and Anibal "Zuma" Burlamaqui, who mixed capoeira with martial arts like judo, boxing, Greco-Roman wrestling and Portuguese stick-fighting. He also practiced capoeira in boxing matches, and was able to win by doing so. Other sources, among them Mestre Itapoan, believe that Bimba made virtually no additions from other martial arts to capoeira, and that all its movements came from batuque or itself; moreover, there are reports of capoeira techniques similar to those from judo as far back as 1888, before Eastern martial arts came to Brazil. On the other hand, it is known that Bimba's student Cisnando Lima was trained in judo under Mitsuyo Maeda and Takeo Yano, and that other students sometimes faced Japanese martial artists in fights. Bimba encouraged adding new kicks to capoeira, as long as they were effective and incorporated into the basic footwork, ginga. In declaration of his style in 1936, Bimba claimed to have subtracted two and added 15 kicks to traditional capoeira. Later, this number rose to 52 techniques from various arts. Martelo and queixada kicks, introduced by Bimba, became hallmarks of the Regional style.

In 1928, Bimba demonstrated his style for Bahia's governor, Juracy Magalhães. Magalhães overturned the ban on capoeira in Bahia and encouraged Bimba to establish his own school there.

== 1930s ==
Machado founded the first capoeira school in 1932. This was called the Academia-escola de Cultura Regional, at the Engenho de Brotas in Salvador, Bahia. Previously, capoeira was only practiced and played on the streets. However, capoeira was still heavily discriminated against by upper-class Brazilian society. In order to change the pejorative reputation of capoeira and its practitioners as devious, stealthy and malicious, Bimba set new standards to the art.

His students had to wear a clean, white uniform, show proof of grade proficiency from school, exercise discipline, show good posture and many other standards. As a result, doctors, lawyers, politicians, upper-middle-class people, and women (until then excluded) started to join his school, providing Bimba with legitimacy and support. Bimba was not completely against accepting exceptionally poor students, but only when they showed talent or attitude.

Bimba tested his new students putting them in a strong gravata or neck lock for three minutes, only accepting them in his school if they endured said time without tapping out. However, after the entrance of his apprentice Cisnando Lima, he changed the initiation test to a demonstration of flexibility and a written examination. Sequences of predetermined movements as a teaching method was one of the major innovations of Bimba. Another key innovation was teaching capoeira to a broader audience, which helped spread the art to different social groups and ultimately contributed to its decriminalization.

Bimba was also an excellent singer and berimbau player.

In 1936, Bimba challenged fighters of any martial art style to test his regional style in a fight, which would be hosted under the boxing-like ruleset innovated by fellow capoeirista Anibal Burlamaqui. He had four matches, fighting against Henrique Bahia, Vítor Benedito Lopes, Américo Ciência and fellow capoeira master José Custódio "Zé I" dos Santos. Bimba won all matches, and received the nickname of "Três Pancadas" ("Three Hits"), meaning he only need three strikes at most to finish an opponent.

Related to his challenges, Bimba had a famous rivalry with other mestres about whether it was valid or not to use hand strikes in the roda, especially after he finished an opponent named Vitor with a asfixiante or galopante. Machado's main detractor, Lúcio "Barra Preta" de Tal, a police chief who had lost money with the result of the match, supposedly ambushed him on the Engenho Velho street in August 1936, carrying a gun and accompanied by six policemen armed with sabers. A scuffle broke out, only for Bimba to disarm and knock all the seven men senseless. According to Bimba, however, it wasn't properly an ambush: the policemen would be drunk and causing turmoil, and Bimba interfered in order to help a young boy they were attacking, starting the brawl only after receiving himself a saber attack that he had to employ his skill to dodge. The newspaper A Tarde covered the incident under the title of "It's not easy to catch a capoeirista! He defended himself using cabeçadas and rabos de arraia" ("Não é fácil pegar um capoeirista... Livrou-se da agressão com cabeçadas e rabos de arraia").

On June 9, 1937, he earned the state board of education certificate and officially registered the first Capoeira center.

Mestre Pastinha established a new style closer to the traditional origins preceding some of Bimba's reforms, named capoeira Angola; the two men became respectful competitors. Bimba's Capoeira Regional academy was geographically near Pastinha's Capoeira Angola school. While it is known that the two mestres respected each other and never talked bad about the other's school, according to mestres Atenilo and Itapoan, Bimba sometimes instructed his students to hit and injure Pastinha's in shared rodas.

== 1940s and 1950s ==
In 1942, Machado opened his second school at the Terreiro de Jesus on Rua das Laranjeiras. The school is still open today and was supervised by his former student, "Vermelho" until the early 1980s. The school then came under the brief supervision of Mestre Almiro, before being transferred to Mestre Bamba; the man who leads the school today. He also taught capoeira to the army and at the police academy. He was then considered "the father of modern capoeira".

Bimba was one of the best capoeiristas of his time, undefeated in numerous public challenges against fighters from various martial arts. In 1945, Bimba and his students were challenged by Jayme Ferreira, a Brazilian jiu-jitsu competitor trained by the Gracie family, who accused regional capoeiristas of avoiding fights. Bimba answered by saying capoeira regional was for self-defense, not for fighting under sport rules.

In 1949, the regional school toured São Paulo in order to show their art. However, their promoter would force them to work full exhibition matches (marmeladas, a word also used for professional wrestling), which Mestre Bimba didn't approve of. During this tour, they received two challenges to fight for real (pra valer), one by Brazilian catch wrestlers led by Piragibe and another one by capoeira carioca leader Mestre Sinhozinho. A two day event was held in Rio de Janeiro starting from April 2, pitting a team of capoeiristas regionales against cariocas and catch wrestlers. Bimba's school lost all the matches by either submission or knockout, with the main event being with his student Jurandir being defeated by carioca Luiz "Cirandinha" Aguiar. The final part was held on April 7, getting a similar result with carioca Rudolf Hermanny winning over regionalista Fernando Perez. It's said Bimba was so impressed that he learned some movements he saw in the fight to absorb them into his own style.

In 1953, he was invited to demonstrate capoeira to the then president of Brazil, Getúlio Dorneles Vargas. Vargas says, "Capoeira is the only sport which was truly Brazilian."

Important names to Brazilian society at that time such as Dr. Joaquim de Araújo Lima (former governor of Guaporé), Jaime Tavares, Rui Gouveia, Alberto Barreto, Jaime Machado, Delsimar Cavalvanti, César Sá, Decio Seabra, José Sisnando and many others were Bimba's students.

== Death and legacy ==
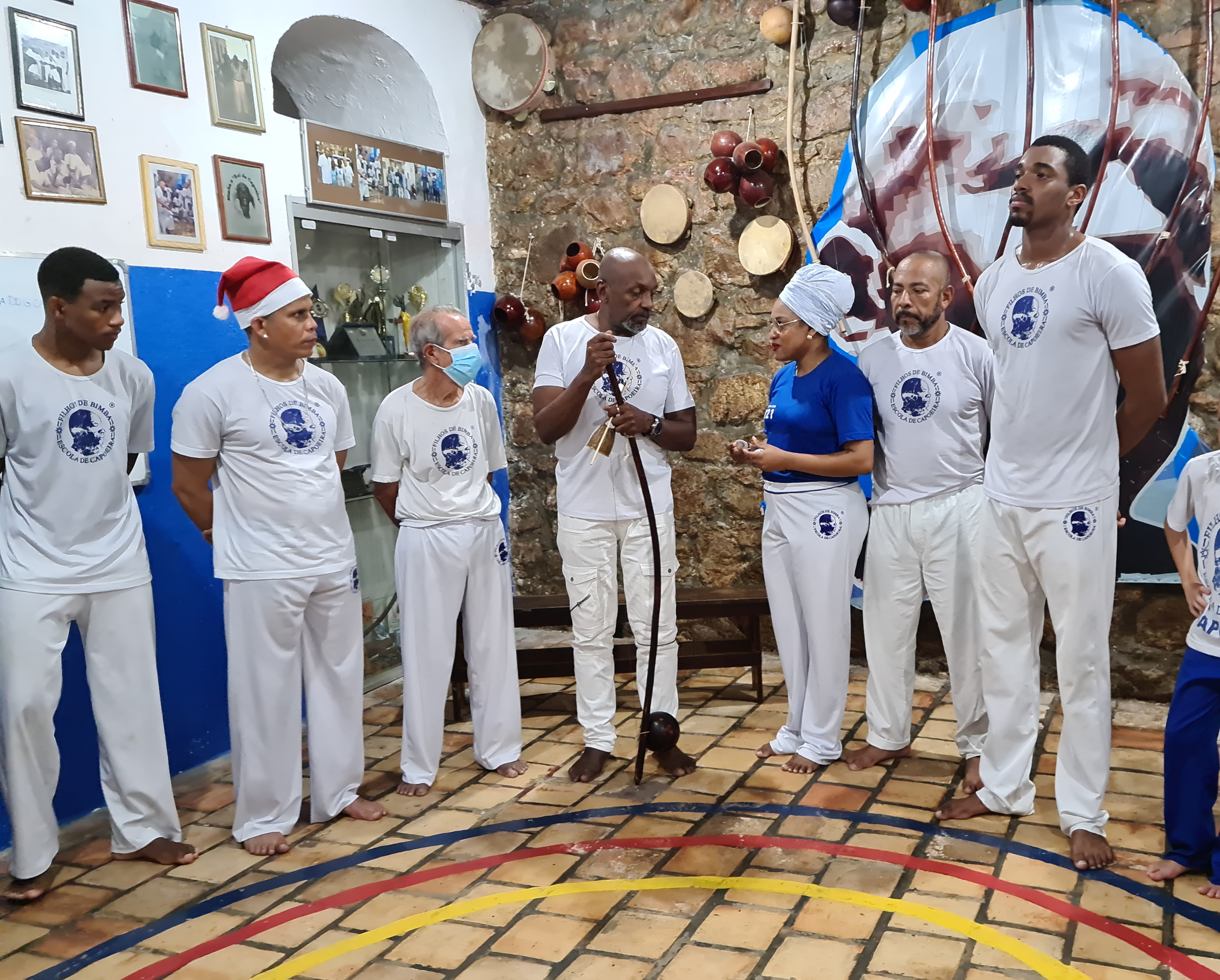
Mestre Bimba's group in 2022

Unhappy with false promises and lack of support from local authorities in Bahia, he moved to Goiânia in 1973 at the invitation of a former student. He died a year later, on February 5, 1974, at the Hospital das Clínicas de Goiânia because of a stroke.

Bimba managed to recover the original values within capoeira, which were used amongst the black slaves centuries before him. For Bimba, capoeira was a fight but "competition" should be permanently avoided since he believed it was a "cooperation" fight, where the stronger player was always responsible for the weaker player and helped him to excel in his own fighting techniques.

Machado fought all his life for what he strongly believed was best for capoeira and succeeded. Machado was posthumously awarded the title Honoris Causa by the Federal University of Bahia.

As of 2023, Bimba's son, Mestre Nenel, continues to teach capoeira in his father's style in Bahia.

To celebrate his 119th birthday, Google released a Google Doodle commemorating him.

=== Academy rules ===

Bimba strongly believed capoeira had an extraordinary value as a self-defense martial art, hence his efforts to develop its learning in a structured and methodical way.

Bimba developed a capoeira teaching method with commandments, principles and traditions, which are still part of the capoeira regional up to this day. Some of his commandments are:

- To stop smoking and drinking since it interferes with the players' performance
- Avoid demonstrating your progress to your friends outside the capoeira roda. Remember that surprise is your best ally in a fight
- Avoid conversation during training, instead observe and learn from watching
- Always ginga
- Practice daily the basic fundamentals
- Keep your body relaxed
- It is better to get "caught" in the roda than on the streets
- Don't be afraid to get close to the opponent. The closer you stay, the better you will learn
- Students must maintain good grades in school or be employed

Bimba also established his own capoeira principles as the basis for his capoeira teaching method:

- Gingar sempre (to keep oneself in constant movement when fighting); ginga is the capoeira basic movement
- Esquivar sempre (to dodge away from the opponent's attacks)
- All movements must have a purpose (attack and corresponding defense movement)
- Preserve a constant fixed position on the ground (acrobatic jumps makes one vulnerable)
- Play according to the rhythm determined by the berimbau (capoeira musical instrument)
- Always play close to your partner
- Respect a player when he/she can no longer defend an attack movement
- Protect the opponent's physical and moral integrity (during the practice, the stronger will protect the weaker player)

Consequently, Bimba created several traditions and rituals to support his methodology:

- A chair was used in order to train beginner students/players
- The charanga is the capoeira orchestra, composed by a berimbau and two pandeiros
- The singing (quadras e corridos), songs composed by Bimba to accompany the game
- The batizado (baptism), the first time the student plays capoeira at the sound of berimbau

The aspects that still makes capoeira regional unique is its method:

- Admission exam (physical test made with capoeira movements to identify students' abilities)
- The sequência (sequence) of the basic 17 capoeira attack and defence movements
- Practice of the different rhythms of the game
- Specific movements: traumatizing, projection, connected and unbalancing
- Practice of cintura desprezada (second sequence practice by advanced students)
- Formatura (capoeira teacher graduation)
- Especialização and emboscada (specific advanced exams)

== In popular culture ==
- Mestre Bimba: A Capoeira Illuminada (2006) is a documentary about Mestre Bimba and Capoeira.

== Literature ==
- Almeida, Bira (1986). Capoeira: A Brazilian Art Form. North Atlantic Books. ISBN 978-0938190295.
- Assunção, Matthias Röhrig (2002). Capoeira: The History of an Afro-Brazilian Martial Art. Routledge. ISBN 978-0-7146-8086-6.
- Capoeira, Nestor (2002). Capoeira: Roots of the Dance-Fight-Game. Blue Snake Books. ISBN 978-1-58394-637-4.
- Capoeira, Nestor (2007). The Little Capoeira Book. Blue Snake Books. ISBN 9781583941980.
- Downey, Greg (2005). Learning Capoeira: Lessons in Cunning from an Afro-Brazilian Art. Oxford University Press. ISBN 978-0-19-517697-1.
- Wesolowski, Katya (2023). Capoeira Connections: A Memoir in Motion. University of Florida Press. ISBN 978-1-68340-320-3.

== See also ==
- Mestre Pastinha
- Mestre Sinhozinho
- Norival Moreira de Oliveira
- João Grande
- João Pequeno
- Bira Almeida (Mestre Acordeon)
