= Puxada de Rede =

Brazilian folkloric dance

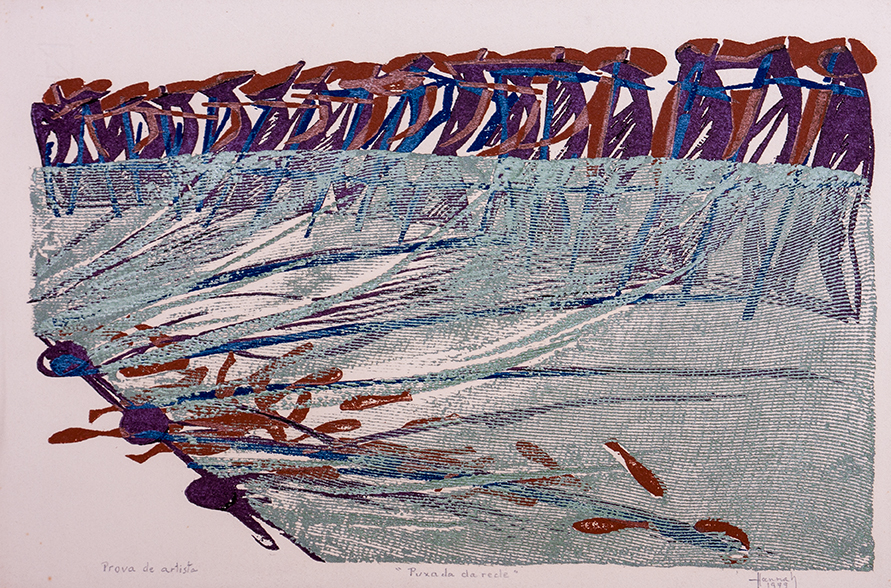
Puxada de rede (1979), gravura de Hannah Brandt

Puxada de rede (lit. "fishing net pulling") is an Afro-Brazilian folkloric dance or play often associated with capoeira performances that mimics the pulling of a fishing net. A traditional folk dance originating in coastal communities in Bahia, it emerged in dance performance in the 1960s.

Ethnomusicologist Emília Biancardi, with her dance group Viva Bahia, the first group of its type, translated it and other traditional dances from the oral tradition to the stage after learning them from Manuel dos Reis Machado, Vicente Ferreira Pastinha and others in and around Salvador.

Mestre Canjiquinha claimed to be the first to incorporate the dance into a "folkloric suite" alongside capoeira, maculelê and samba de roda. It has a repertoire of songs about fishing, the sea, and worship of Iemanja, who often appears in the dance. It is widely taught in capoeira schools.

== Plot ==
A fisherman goes out to fish at night on a jangada, a handmade sailing raft used by fishermen of north-eastern Brazil. His wife has a presentiment of something wrong and tries to stop him from going fishing that night. He goes anyway, leaving his wife crying and his kids scared. His wife waits the whole night for him on the beach, and around 5:00am, the usual arrival time, she sees the jangada. The fishermen look very sad, and some are crying, but she does not see her husband. The fishermen tell her that her husband fell off the jangada. As they start to withdraw the net, they find his body amongst the fish. His friends carry his body in a traditional funeral ritual on the beach. The fishermen composed a dance in his memory and called it "puxada de rede"; it has two rhythms.

== Lyrics ==
English translation in italics where available.

NO MAR

No mar, no mar, no mar, no mar eu ouvi cantar
In the sea, in the sea, in the sea, in the sea I heard singing
No mar, no mar, no mar minha sereia, ela é sereia
In the sea, in the sea, in the sea my mermaid, she is a mermaid

MINHA JANGADA VAI SAIR P'RO MAR

Minha jangada vai sair p'ro mar
My jangada is going out to sea
Vou trabalhar, meu bem querer
I'm going to work, my love.
Se Deus quiser quando eu voltar do mar
If God wants when I return from the sea
Um peixe bom, eu vou trazer
A good fish, I will bring
Meus companheiros tambem vão voltar
My friends will also return
E a Deus do céu vamos agradecer
and to God we will give thanks

A REDE PUXA

A puxa a marra marinheiro
A rede puxa
A puxa lá que eu puxo cá
A rede puxa
A puxa a marra samangolê
A rede puxa

PUXA A MARRA MARINHEIRO

Puxa a marra marinheiro puxa a marra
E olha o vento que te leva pela a barra
