= Ginga (capoeira) =

Fundamental footwork (or dancing move) of capoeira

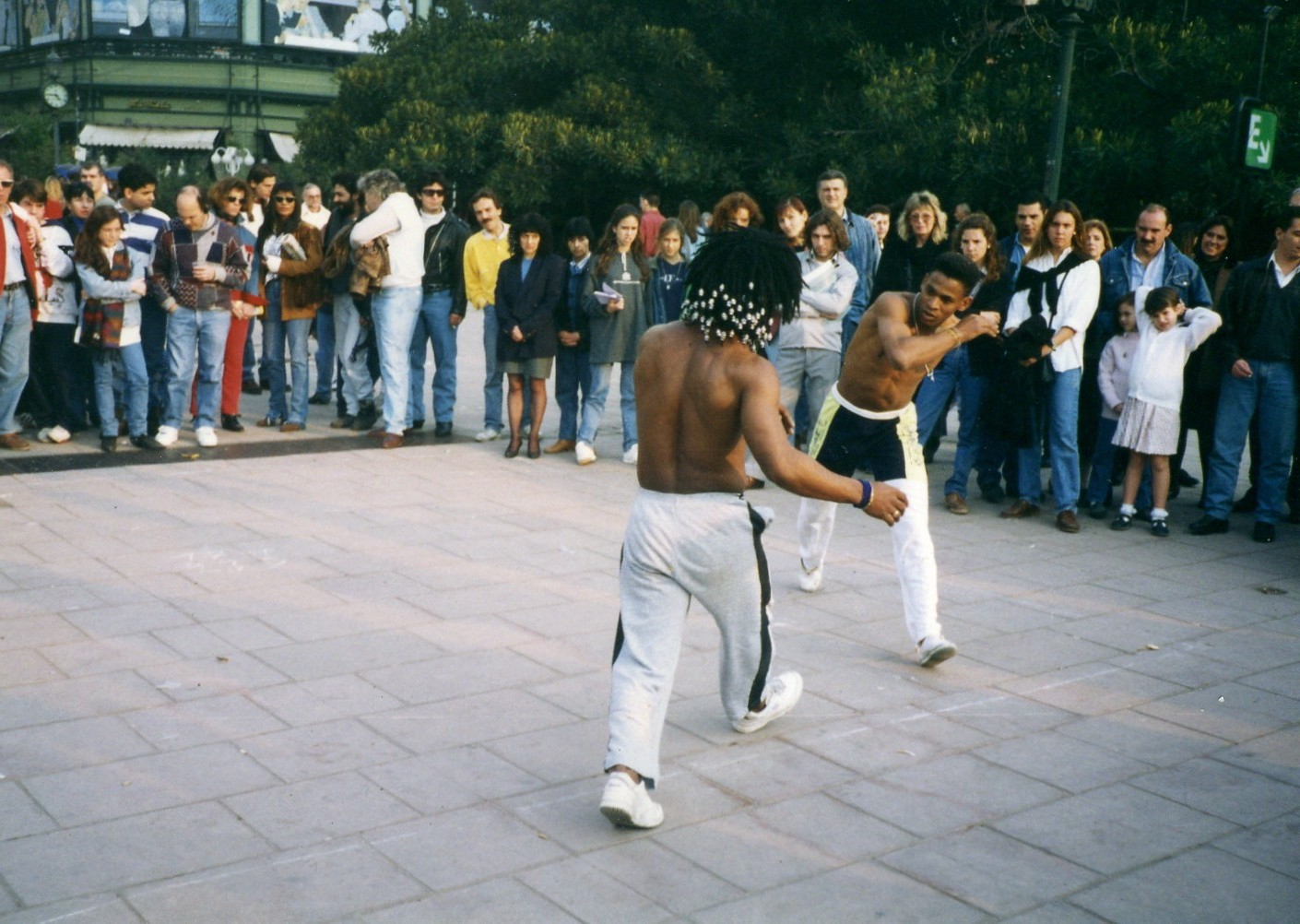
- Two capoeira players in ginga
- Name: Ginga
- Meaning: to sway, dance, play (Bantu)
- Type: footwork, dance move
- Parent style: capoeira Angola
- Parent technique: engolo base step
- Child technique(s): balanço

The ginga (pronounced jeen-gah; from gingar - to sway) is the fundamental footwork (or dancing move) of capoeira. It is a sidestep that can be a prance or a shuffle and it sets the rhythm of the game. The ginga embodies the extraordinary cunning of capoeira, which is its fundamental characteristic.

The capoeira game starts with keeping the body in constant motion with dancelike steps, making capoeiristas elusive targets for opponents. The constant triangular footwork makes capoeira both easily recognizable and confusing, since it looks much more like a rhythmic dance step than a fighting stance.

The ginga distinguishes capoeira from other martial arts. Only a few others employ similar rhythmic footwork, including taekkyon and some forms of pencak silat.

The initial form of ginga comes from engolo, the forerunner of capoeira.

== Name ==
By the late 19th century this motion was called ginga in Brazil, a Bantu term found in the Kongo language and many Njila languages of Angola, meaning "to dance, sway, or play". Although the term ginga likely originated primarily from the northern Angolan languages, it is noteworthy that in many Cimbebasian languages, njenga meant "to joke or play," and ndjinga repeated meant "to remain in motion shaking, undulating, or rocking."

== Application ==
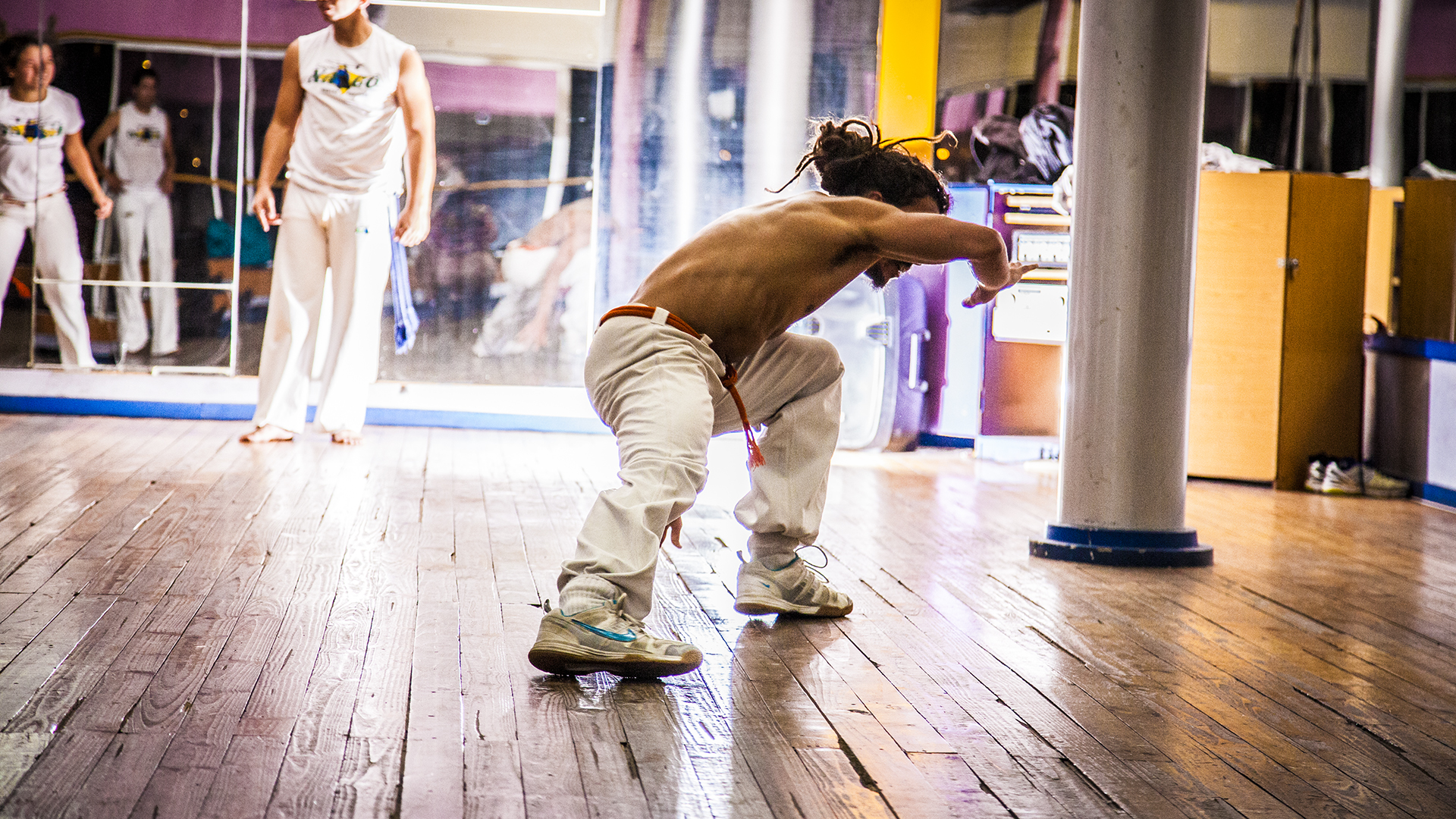
Low variant of ginga

Capoeiras unanimously affirm that the ginga is the first principle of capoeira. The constant, ceaseless movement of the body — gingar — is the principle that creates snares of deception, of trickery, by which the adversary can be taken unawares.

— Cesar Barbieri

Ginga is a key move which holds diverse parts of the capoeira game together. It enables capoeiristas to hide, dodge, feint, and attack while continuously shifting stances to cause confusion and make the capoeirista a frustrating target for a forward-advancing opponent. The ginga also allows the capoeirista to continuously maintain enough torque to use in a strike while providing a synchronization of arm movement to avoid and slip under attacks. The ginga is not static, so its speed is usually determined by the toque or rhythm dictated by the bateria.

The aim of ginga is diverting the opponent's attention to make them vulnerable to his attacks. The movements of the ginga are smooth and highly flexible, easily confusing those unfamiliar with capoeira, making them an easy target.

According to Pastinha, the constant movement of the arms up and down and from inside to outside, which can also be reversed, provides valuable resources for defense against knife attacks and strikes from various weapons. Capoeira practitioners can swiftly counter on the aggressor's forearm, all while maintaining the ability to execute the classic "rasteira" (sweep) in a fraction of a second.

Ginga also enhances balance, lending the body the grace and smoothness typical of a dancer.

== Variations ==
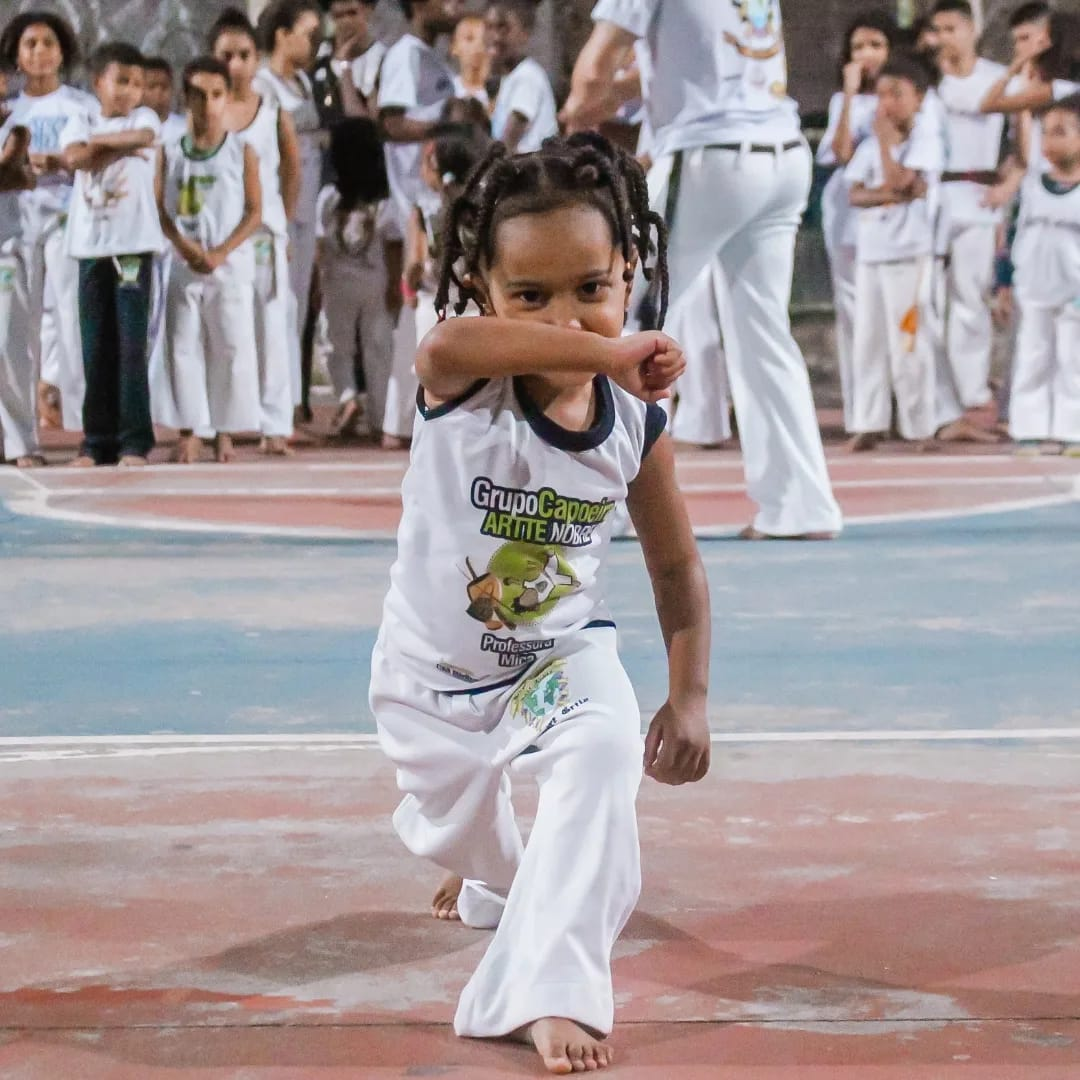
Ginga performed by a three-year-old child

Angola and Regional styles in capoeira have distinctive versions of this movement. In Capoeira Angola, the ginga is more expressive and individualistic, while in capoeira Regional the ginga has a more structured and defensive look. Most Capoeira regional academies teach the ginga in the same way until the student advances to a certain level and begins to develop their own expressive and comfortable way of using it.

Mestre Augusto, from capoeira Angola tradition, describes the essence of the ginga:

Capoeira, at its essence, is an expression of yourself, this no one can take away, the way in which you ginga. You can look into an academy and see that no one has the same ginga. The way one gingas is a label of where one learns, but later one loses all of this. It is an expression of each person, it is yourself expressing the movement of capoeira. There comes a point in capoeira, when you begin to have intimacy with her, you begin to express yourself, not of the mestre who taught you, but of what you have inside.

== Ginga walk ==
The acrobatic maneuvers typical of capoeira, and the flexibility that its continuous practice bestows upon the body, confer upon the players a specific form of walking: andar gingado or "walking with a sway."

At the beginning of the 19th century, when capoeira was persecuted, some players were even arrested for "walking as capoeiras."

== Interpretations ==
Ginga animation

At the congress of capoeristas in Brazil in 1984, a conversation ensued about how to perform ginga. Mestre Itapoan claimed that mestre Camisa distorts capoeira because all of his students do the ginga in the same way. Itapoan noted that he had seen a theater play in which one actor did the ginga in a way that made it obvious that he was a student of Camisa. Itapoan pointed out that in Bahia and in Mestre Bimba's school, no one does the ginga in the same way. He said that the ginga is the capoeirista's identity, and that is why he believed that Camisa was distorting capoeira.

Camisa agreed that the ginga is something personal, but he also pointed out that capoeira is a fighting form, and that some body positions are better than others in combat. Camisa explained that his method is to relate attack and defense positions to an axis. For example, he does not allow his students to stretch out their front leg during the ginga, because if they receive a pisao kick on a stretched knee, they could be seriously injured. Similarly, he advises his students against crossing their back leg, because this could make them vulnerable to a banda takedown.

== Literature ==
- Pastinha, Mestre (1988). Capoeira Angola. Fundação Cultural do Estado da Bahia.
- Assunção, Matthias Röhrig (2002). Capoeira: The History of an Afro-Brazilian Martial Art. Routledge. ISBN 978-0-7146-8086-6.
- Capoeira, Nestor (2002). Capoeira: Roots of the Dance-Fight-Game. Blue Snake Books. ISBN 978-1-58394-637-4.
- Capoeira, Nestor (2007). The Little Capoeira Book. Blue Snake Books. ISBN 9781583941980.
- Talmon-Chvaicer, Maya (2008). The Hidden History of Capoeira: A Collision of Cultures in the Brazilian Battle Dance. University of Texas Press. ISBN 978-0-292-71723-7.
- Desch-Obi, M. Thomas J. (2008). Fighting for Honor: The History of African Martial Art Traditions in the Atlantic World. Columbia: University of South Carolina Press. ISBN 978-1-57003-718-4.
- Taylor, Gerard (2012). Capoeira 100: An Illustrated Guide to the Essential Movements and Techniques. Blue Snake Books. ISBN 9781583941768.

== See also ==
- Capoeira
- List of capoeira techniques
