= Capoeira =

Afro-Brazilian martial art

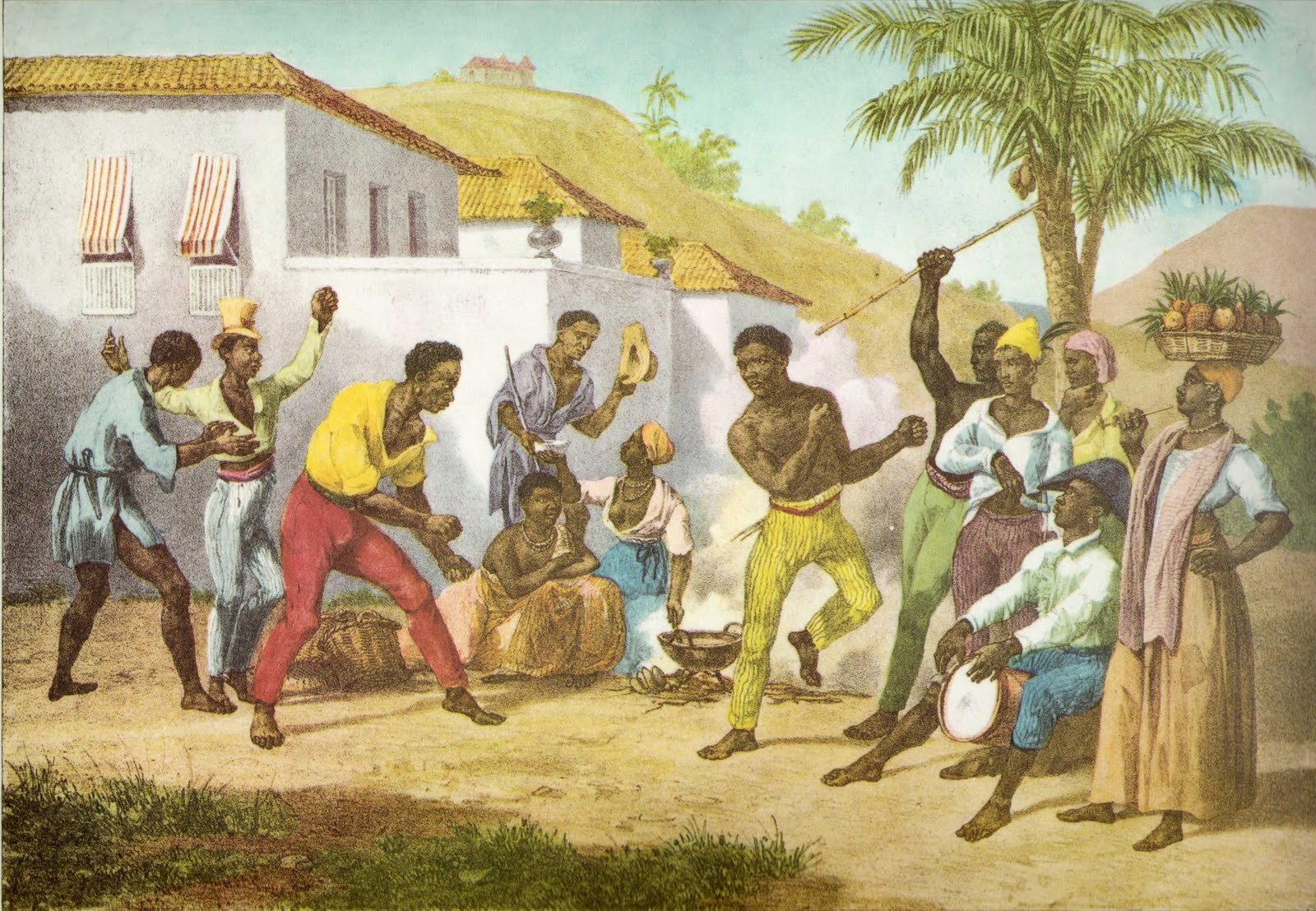
- Capoeira or the Dance of War by Johann Moritz Rugendas, 1825
- Also known as: Capoeiragem
- Focus: Kicks, evasions, takedowns, handstands, acrobatics
- Hardness: Full-contact
- Country of origin: Brazil
- Date of formation: Unknown; first documented in 1789
- Famous practitioners: Mestre Pastinha (1889-1981); Mestre Sinhozinho (1891-1962); Besouro Mangangá (c.1895-c.1924); Mestre Zuma (1898-1965); Mestre Bimba (1899 or 1900-1974); João Pequeno (1917-2011); Mestre Canjiquinha (1925-1994); João Grande (b.1933); Bira Almeida (b.1943); Nestor Capoeira (1946-2025); Jelon Vieira (b.1953); Mestre Camisa (b.1955); Cobra Mansa (b.1960)
- Ancestor arts: Batuque, engolo
- Related arts: Macuelê; Samba de roda Puxada de rede Breakdancing
- Meaning: Forest clearing

Capoeira (Portuguese pronunciation: [kapuˈe(j)ɾɐ]) is an Afro-Brazilian martial art and game that includes elements of dance, acrobatics, music, and spirituality.

Capoeira has been practiced among Black Brazilians for centuries; scholars have identified roots in engolo, a traditional Bantu martial art practiced in Angola. Capoeira is first mentioned in an official document in 1789, as a criminal activity. In the 19th century, a street fighting style called capoeira carioca appeared; it was also criminalized. In the early 1930s, Mestre Bimba reformed traditional capoeira and developed the capoeira regional style, which established standardized teaching sequences. The government came to see capoeira as a socially acceptable sport, legalizing it in 1937 and promoting it as part of national culture. In 1941, Mestre Pastinha founded his school where he cultivated the traditional capoeira Angola, distinguishing it from reformed capoeira and the "national sport" approach. Both of these influential teachers came from the Bahia region of Brazil.

In the mid-20th century, capoeira became increasingly recognized outside Brazil. Women, who were previously marginalized in capoeira, began to participate much more often in the culture. Beginning in the 1960s, the Grupo Senzala, from Rio de Janeiro, became increasingly influential, practicing a particularly athleticized version of capoeira. In the late 1970s, trailblazers such as Jelon Vieira and Bira Almeida brought capoeira to the US and Europe, helping the art to become internationally recognized and practiced. In the 1980s, capoeira Angola received greater visibility, and capoeira culture began to place greater explicit emphasis on anti-racism. In 2014, capoeira was granted a special protected status as intangible cultural heritage by UNESCO. It is practiced all over the world, has appeared in commercial martial arts films, and has influenced the fighting styles of some practitioners of mixed martial arts.

Capoeira is played as a game in a roda, a ceremonial circle, along with musical accompaniment guided by a traditional bow called a berimbau. The fundamental movement of capoeira is the ginga, a rhythmic sidestep. Other moves include kicks, handstrikes, sweeps (rasteira) and cartwheels (aú). It includes acrobatic and complex manoeuvres, often involving hands on the ground and inverted kicks. It emphasizes flowing movements rather than fixed stances. Some practitioners and interpreters understand capoeira in terms of Afro-Brazilian culture or African philosophy.

== History ==
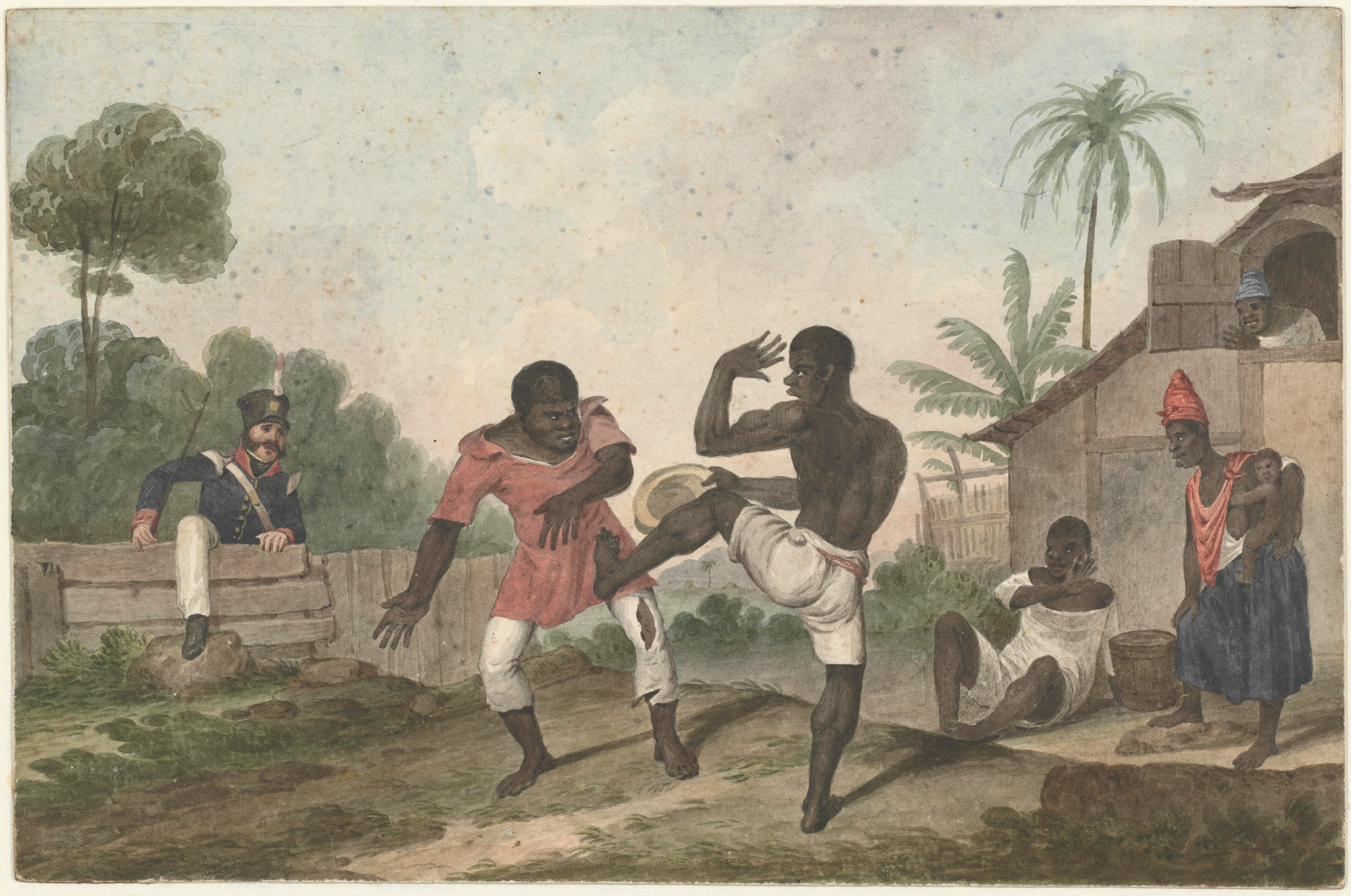
Capoeira, Brazils, by Augustus Earle, c. 1822. Watercolor painting depicting an illegal capoeira-like game in Rio de Janeiro.

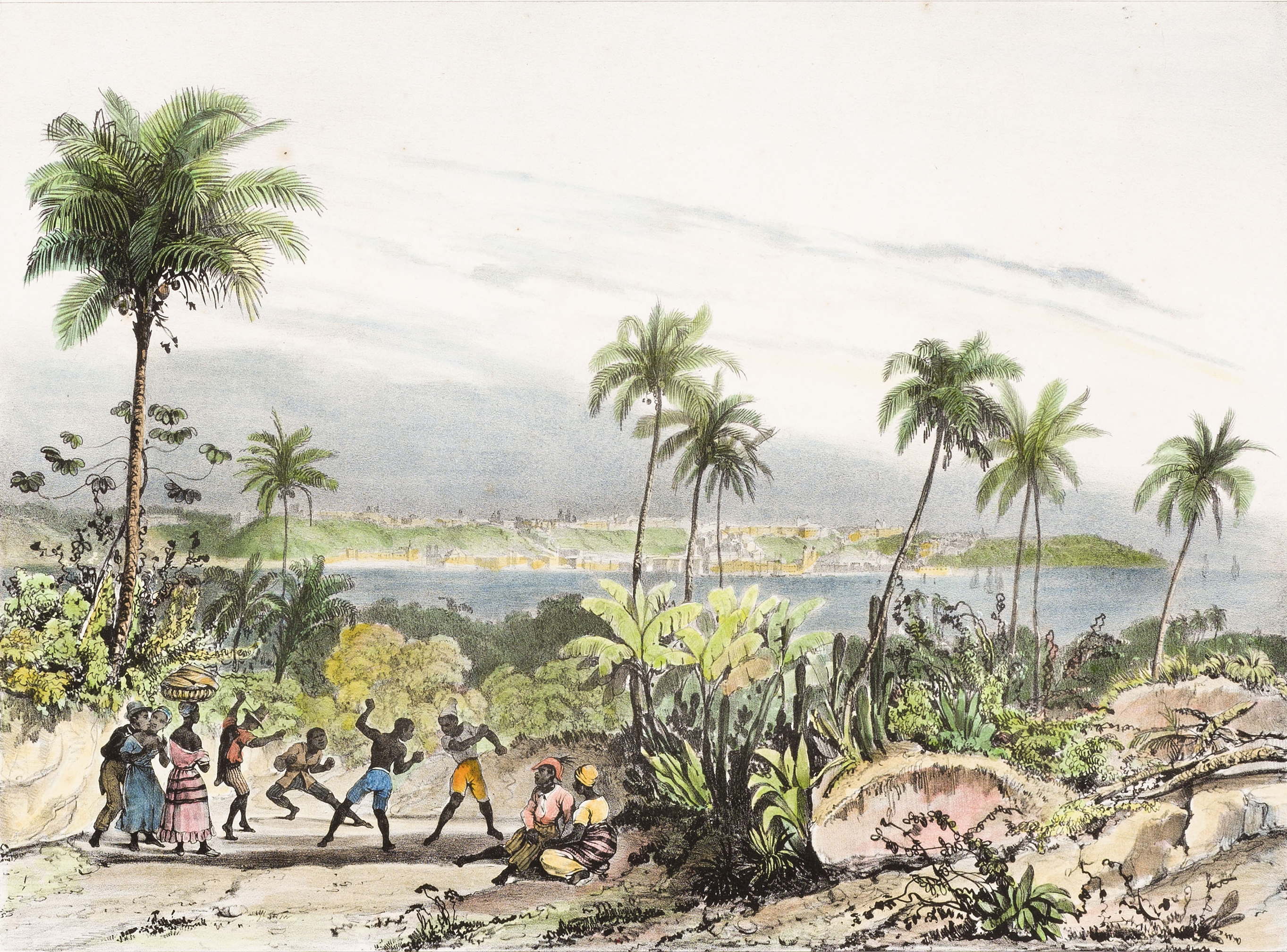
San Salvador, 1835, by Rugendas. "The scene is set in a clearing surrounded by tropical vegetation and palm trees, corresponding precisely to the space called capoeira in Brazil."

=== Etymology ===
In police documents, capoeira was known as capoeiragem, with a practitioner being called capoeira. Gradually, the art became known as capoeira, with a practitioner being called a capoeirista. In a narrower sense, capoeiragem meant a set of fighting skills. The term jogo de capoeira (capoeira game) is used to describe the art in the performative context. Although debated, the most widely accepted origin of the word capoeira comes from the Tupi words ka'a ("forest") paũ ("round"), referring to small forested areas in the Brazilian interior where fugitive slaves would hide.

=== 18th century and prior: Origins in Angola and transmission to Brazil ===
Capoeira first appeared among Africans in Brazil during the early colonial period. According to oral traditions preserved by old capoeira mestres and within the capoeira community, the art has historical connections to Angola. Although the exact origins of capoeira remain uncertain, some studies have suggested that engolo was one of the African traditions that may have influenced its development, with the Cunene region identified as one of the areas associated with the practice. Some authors argue that other African and Brazilian practices also contributed to the formation of capoeira, rather than a single ancestral tradition; Assunção identifies moraingy, a fighting style from Madagascar, as a possible precursor. Similarities between engolo and capoeira have been noted in movements such as crescent kicks, push kicks, sweeps, handstands, cartwheels, evasions, and techniques such as meia lua de compasso, scorpion kick, and cartwheel kick, although the extent of a direct historical connection remains debated. Some commentators, practitioners and historians emphasize the African origins of capoeira, while others draw attention to its development in the unique Brazilian context; capoeira did not develop independently in any African diasporic community outside Brazil. Capoeira was first mentioned in a judicial document under the name Capoeiragem in 1789, as "the gravest of crimes".

=== 19th century ===
Slavery was an institution in Brazil for centuries; there was a period of general tolerance of African cultural practices until 1814, but at that time there was a systematic repression of capoeira activities. Slavery was not abolished until 1888. The street capoeira practiced in late 19th-century Rio de Janeiro was often associated with violent confrontations. This street-fighting capoeiragem incorporated different fighting elements, including foot kicks, headbutts, hand blows, knife fighting and stick-fighting. The late 19th century street-fighting capoeiragem was a mixed martial art, combining five main fighting techniques: headbutts, foot kicks, open hand blows, blades, and stick techniques. The straight razor (navalha) was most common capoeira weapon, also used for assassinations. Blade techniques were a natural extension of unarmed capoeira; the razor was seamlessly integrated into the core art by gripping it between the toes, preserving the feet as the primary weapon while adding efficiency with the blade. Headbutts were the capoeiras' primary technique, as per police records. In one case, when a soldier attempted to arrest Celestino, a capoeirista from Salvador, he instead received a headbutt that "caused his death almost instantly". In other case, a police officer in Rio had been murdered with a headbutt, whose upper body "had been flattened as if the implement of death had been a mallet". This historical form of capoeira became known as capoeira carioca, referring to its association with Rio de Janeiro. Capoeira was listed as a crime in the Brazilian penal code of 1890.

=== 1900s and 1910s ===
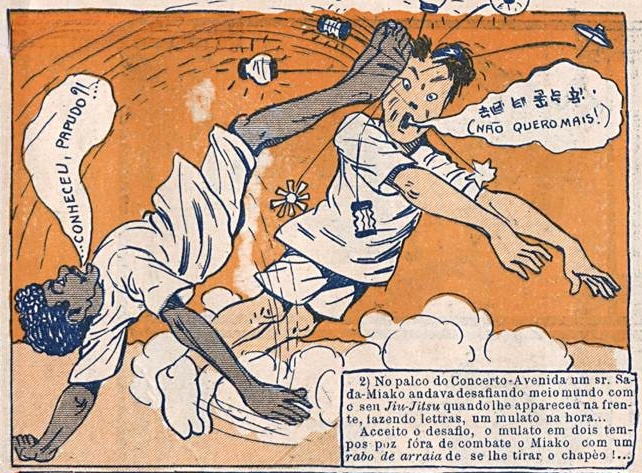
Panel by Alfredo Storni featuring capoeirista Ciríaco defeating jujitsu fighter Sada Miyako with a rabo de arraia kick, O Malho, 1909.

Main proponents of the fighting-oriented capoeira of Rio de Janeiro were Mestre Sinhozinho and Mestre Zuma. In this period, capoeiristas usually carried knives and bladed weapons with them, or hid blades in unusual places such as umbrellas or the berimbau (a traditional musical instrument). When street capoeira was illegal in Brazil, capoeiristas and other outlawed groups like female prostitutes, street vendors, and Candomblé priestesses would benefit each other by setting up their rodas (capoeira circles) and stands near each other. The capoeiristas would bring business by buying food from the street vendors, while the women would keep a lookout for police, concealing the weapons of capoeira fighters. Although very few women took part in capoeira in this period, there is documented evidence that a small number of women were trained in it.

In 1909, capoeirista Ciríaco Francisco da Silva defeated Japanese jujutsu fighter Sada Miyako in one of the first documented examples of vale tudo (early mixed martial arts). Besouro Mangangá (1895-1924) was a legendary capoeira fighter of the early 20th century; while there is only one historical record of his existence, his exploits are recounted in various songs and tales, such as his ability to transform into a beetle. The Rio variation of capoeira was repressed and slowly disappeared, leaving Bahia as the center of capoeira practice.

=== 1920s and 1930s ===
Nestor Capoeira argues that capoeira as we know it is concentrated in the Bahia region, because Bahia synthesized capoeira's fighting method with ritual culture; in contrast, the capoeira of Rio de Janeiro was primarily a fighting style. In the 1920s, capoeira in Bahia faced repression from the cavalry squadron of police chief Pedro de Azevedo Gordilho; this led to a more harmless dance version of the art form. Partly as a response to this domestication, capoeira regional began to take form in the 1920s, when Mestre Bimba (1899-1974) met his future student, José Cisnando Lima. Both believed that capoeira was losing its martial side and concluded there was a need to re-strengthen and structure it. Bimba created his sequências de ensino (teaching combinations) and created capoeira's first teaching method. Advised by Cisnando, Bimba decided to call his style Luta Regional Baiana, as capoeira was still illegal at that time.

Almeida contends that modern-day capoeira begins with Mestre Bimba's practice in the early 1930s. State repression of capoeira decreased after the military coup of Gétulio Vargas, who advocated a strategy of cultural populism. Mestre Bimba established a formal school in 1932, when the Bahia local government agreed to allow it; he developed capoeira regional, a reformed style including aspects of batuque, which he learned from his father, and instituting training sequences. There is controversy regarding the question of whether Mestre Bimba also borrowed from non-Brazilian styles, such as jujutsu and boxing. Mestre Bimba took part in many street fights and public matches, sometimes to establish his skills and sometimes for practical reasons; a news report of 1936 recounts that Mestre Bimba applied capoeira to defend himself and a young boy from police. Capoeira regional has a formal means of instruction and emphasizes fighting skills. Training focuses mainly on attack, dodging and counter-attack, giving high importance to precision and discipline. Use of jumps or aerial acrobatics stay to a minimum, since one of its foundations is always keeping at least one hand or foot firmly attached to the ground. Mestre Bimba included in his teachings a curso de especialização or "specialization course", in which the pupils would be taught defenses against knives and guns, as well as the use of bladed weapons. Capoeira was legalized and promoted by the Brazilian state beginning in 1937, and became an official national sport under Vargas' government.

=== 1940s ===
Modern capoeira is strongly associated with Bahia; in this region, there emerged a distinction between two traditions of practice, in the 1940s. Mestre Pastinha (1889-1981) established his capoeira Angola style in 1941, distinguishing it from the "national sport" approach. The ideal of capoeira Angola is to maintain capoeira as close to its roots as possible. While Mestre Bimba considered capoeira to be formed by circumstances in Bahia, Brazil, Mestre Pastinha argued that it was essentially African. Although Mestre Pastinha strove to preserve the original Angolan art, he nevertheless introduced significant changes to capoeira practice of his time. Unlike Mestre Bimba, he forbade weapons; like Mestre Bimba, he moved training away from the street into a school and started to teach women. Capoeira Angola is characterized by strategy, with sneaking movements executed standing or near the floor depending on the situation; it values the traditions of malícia, malandragem and the unpredictability of the original capoeira. The anthropologist Alejandro Frigerio defines capoeira Angola as art, versus capoeira Regional as sport; he identifies defining characteristics as capoeira Angola as cunning, complementarity of the two players" movements, a low game, the absence of violence, beautiful movements (according to a "Black aesthetic"), slow music and the importance of ritual and theatricality. Unlike many other capoeira groups that play barefoot, angoleiros always train with shoes.

In the 1940s, capoeira fighters took part in public matches with practitioners of other martial arts, called vale tudo. Capoeira was traditionally male-dominated, but Mestre Bimba trained six women for an international festival in the mid-1940s. Ebony magazine published an article publicizing capoeira in the United States, in 1947. The magazine focuses on Mestre Bimba's school, reporting that he taught two versions of the practice, one focusing on self-defense and the other on athletic practice; the article also argues that most of Bahia's policemen had become students of Mestre Bimba's insititute.

=== 1950s and 1960s ===
Mestre Bimba made many presentations of his new style; the best known took place in 1953 for the audience of Getúlio Vargas, after which the president declared that "Capoeira is the only truly national sport." Obligatory uniforms for capoeira groups became common practice in the 1960s. By the 1960s, capoeira regional had introduced the first ranking method in capoeira: calouro (freshman), formado (graduated) and formado especializado (specialist). After 1964, when a student completed a course, a special celebration ceremony occurred, ending with the teacher tying a silk scarf around the capoeirista's neck.

Bira Almeida graduated from Mestre Bimba's school in 1959 and opened his own in 1962; his school aimed to include both regional and Angola styles. In 1964, Almeida created the Grupo Folclórico da Bahia, which integrated capoeira with theater and related Afro-Brazilian cultural practices, and toured throughout Brazil. The group toured Rio de Janeiro in 1966, and one of its performers established a new school in that city. In 1968, the Grupo Folclórico da Bahia won international prizes in Argentina, Ecuador, and Peru. In 1964, the Grupo Senzala also formed, initially by teenagers in Rio and subsequently incorporating students of Mestre Bimba and Mestra Pastinha. The group was primary young white men of the upper middle class; they also incorporated training and techniques of Shotokan karate, which had become popular in Rio. From 1967 to 1969, Golden Berimbau tournaments were held in Rio de Janeiro, all of three of which were won by the Grupo Senzala organization; Senzala practiced an athleticized and acrobatic form of capoeira regional. Capoeira also flourished in the city of São Paulo beginning in the 1960s; Mestre Suassuna was a prominent figure throughout this period. Mestre Canjiquinha also played an important role in shaping the São Paulo capoeira style, which drew from both Regional and Angola styles while developing distinct characteristics. In 1968 and 1969, the first national meetings of mestres from all the regions of Brazil took place; the events were partly sponsored by the Brazilian Air Force. Capoeira regional spread throughout Brazil after the 1960s, tending to absorb other local variants.

=== 1970s and 1980s ===
The 1975 Capoeira Cup

In 1970, Mestre Bimba became discouraged by a lack of official support and moved from Bahia to Goías; he died in 1974. Rio and São Paulo became regional centers of capoeira, on par with Bahia. In 1972, the Brazilian government made capoeira an official sport and tried to establish official rules; however, these were not universally adopted. In the 1970s, capoeira was in conversation with other developments in athletics in Brazil, such as the Gracie family and Brazilian jiu-jitsu, as well as football in Brazil. Nestor Capoeira likely became the first to teach capoeira in Europe; first teaching at the London Contemporary Dance School in 1971, before touring European cities for three years. Jelon Vieira began teaching capoeira in New York City in 1975; he founded the Capoeira Foundation in the U.S. in 1976. Demonstrations by Vieira may have inspired the incorporation of some capoeira movements into breakdancing. Bira Almeida, a student of Mestre Bimba's, settled on the West Coast of the United States in 1979. In the 1980s, João Grande, a student of Mestre Pastinha's, began teaching on the East Coast. Numerous Brazilian groups toured Europe, the United States, and other countries, showcasing capoeira alongside other Brazilian rhythms and dances. Almeida reported that in 1984 there were about 300 capoeira students in California, 60 in New York, and about 100 scattered elsewhere.

The Grupo Senzala, practicing regional, was the most influential capoeira style in the 1970s and 1980s. However, during the mid-1980s, capoeira Angola also became more prestigious, in tandem with a broader revival of Afro-Brazilian culture. Greg Downey, an anthropologist, links this revival to Brazilian Carnival groups who created mass popular support for African forms of cultural expression, such as Ilê Aiyê. The Grupo de Capoeira Angola Pelourinho (GCAP) criticized a perceived emphasis on technical skills in capoeira regional, and a corresponding deficiency of cultural elements. The majority of modern practitioners affirm to be neither Angola nor Regional, emphasizing that "there is only one capoeira". In 1984, the First National Meeting of the Art of Capoeira took place at the Circo Voador, partly organized by the Senzala group. The meeting brought old masters together with younger talent, and presented a more experimental approach to the global future of capoeira. Since the mid-1980s, there has been an increasing emphasis on conscious anti-racism in capoeira culture. In the 1970s and 1980s, women became much more active participants in the capoeira community, in Brazil and globally. The first wave of female capoeira mestras appeared in the 1980s. In 1988, Mestre Camisa split from Grupo Senzala to form ABADÁ-Capoeira.

=== 1990s ===
In 1992, João Grande established his academy in New York. In 1995, a capoeirista named Mestre Hulk knocked out a Brazilian jiu-jitsu fighter to win a vale tudo competition; this led to debate within the community regarding an increasing aggression in some forms of capoeira. Capoeira fights have, on occasion, resulted in severe injuries and even fatalities, as seen in Petrópolis in 1996. In the 1990s, Cobra Mansa began teaching capoeira in Seattle. In this period, there was increasing visibility of capoeira in popular culture. In 1994, capoeira appeared in an American martial arts film, Only the Strong. The choreography for the film was done by Amen Santo. In addition, many of Wesley Snipes' action films include scenes involving capoeira, as he is trained in it. The character Eddy Gordo appeared in the video game Tekken 3 in 1997.

There was also increasing participation in capoeira by women throughout the 1990s, partly influenced by feminism in Brazil. Mestra Janja and Mestra Paulinha founded Grupo Nzinga, creating new leadership roles for Afro-Brazilian women. In the late 1990s, ABADÁ-Capoeira became one of the largest groups, with 25,000 members across Brazil and worldwide. Mestra Edna Lima, affiliated with ABADÁ, became the first female capoeira master in the United States. In Rio, capoeira communities overlapped with the culture of funk carioca. In Bahia, Mestre Nenel, the son of Mestre Bimba, continued to teach in his father's tradition.

=== 21st century ===
In 2001, Europe saw its first native mestre, Edgardo Sananiello. In April 2002 the First International Capoeira Championship of Asia and the Pacific took place in Sydney, featuring 60 groups. In 2002, a Brazilian capoeira group also traveled to Angola to connect with the roots of the art form. Capoeira became increasingly visible in popular culture; a plotline concerning it appeared on the ninth season of the popular Brazilian soap opera Malhação (2002-2003). In 2004, capoeira appeared in a variety of American movies, TV shows, and video games and became a fitness trend. Anthropologist Katya Wesolowski notes that "capoeira had become an 'exotic' dance-fitness fad stripped of contextual signifiers and packaged for global consumption." As of 2006, Nestor Capoeira estimated about 7,000 capoeira students in the United States. Capoeira today is an active exporter of Afro-Brazilian culture all over the world. Present on every continent, every year capoeira attracts thousands of foreign students and tourists to Brazil. Foreign capoeiristas learn Portuguese to better understand and become part of the form. Capoeira mestres often teach abroad and establish their own schools. Capoeira presentations are common sights around the world. Globalized capoeira has become a space where "class, ethnic, gender and cultural differences are played out and renegotiated". Moreover, Wesolowski suggests that it has become increasingly globalized: "Early capoeira migration from the 1970s to 1990s was predominantly to North America, Europe, Australia, and Japan—places where Brazilian instructors hoped to improve their quality of life. Starting in the early 2000s, capoeira groups were popping up in African, South American, and Caribbean locales." Capoeira featured in the 2008 European Games in Brussels; Wesolowski suggests that Brazil is no longer the center of capoeira. Capoeira continued to affect mixed martial arts; in 2009, Brazilian fighter Marcus "Lelo" Aurélio (also known as Professor Barrãozinho), knocked out his opponent Keegan Marshall with a capoeira kick, a meia lua de compasso.

In 2014 the roda de capoeira (capoeira circle) was added to UNESCO's Representative List of the Intangible Cultural Heritage of Humanity, the convention recognised that the "capoeira circle is a place where knowledge and skills are learned by observation and imitation" and that it "promotes social integration and the memory of resistance to historical oppression". In 2017, an international Women's Capoeira Angola Conference took place in Washington, DC, in large part discussing sexism in capoeira tradition and how to overcome it. Capoeira also influenced Chadwick Boseman's fight scenes in the 2018 film Black Panther.

== As a game ==
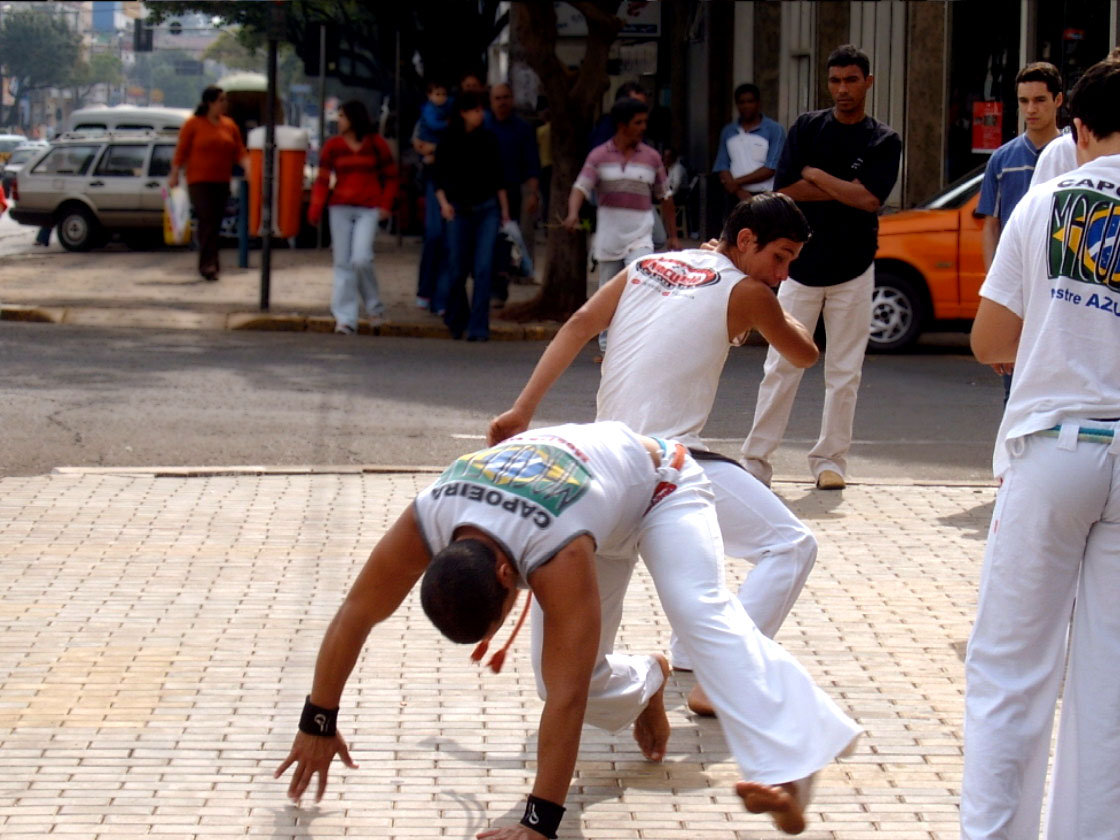
Capoeiristas outside

Capoeira practitioners do not speak of "fighting" or "dancing" but rather of "playing" (jogar). Some scholars have interpreted capoeira as a way of concealing martial arts within dance movements. However, research from Angola suggests that the relationship between game, fight, and dance may be even deeper. These scholars propose that the ambivalence between these three elements is a fundamental aspect of the ancestral grammar shared by engolo and capoeira. In Bantu culture, the Nkhumbi term ochimama encapsulates the overlapping meanings of game, dance, and tradition; this overlap is also found in Afro-Brazilian folklore, where many similar forms of expression are called brincadeiras (games). Capoeira training requires the practice of musical instruments and songs as well as physical techniques and game-playing strategy.

The berimbau is the primary instrument of capoeira, setting the rhythm for the game. Musical rhythms dictate different types of games; for example, the banguela rhythm calls for a low, tricky game, while the Iuna rhythm indicates more acrobatic movements, and São Bento grande demands speed and strength. Playing capoeira is both a game and a method of practicing the application of capoeira movements in simulated combat. While it can be played anywhere, it is usually done in a roda (pronounced [ˈʁodɐ]). During the game most capoeira moves are used, but capoeiristas usually avoid punches or elbow strikes unless it is a very aggressive game. The game does not focus on knocking down or defeating opponents, but rather on body dialogue and highlighting skills.

The roda is a circle formed by capoeiristas and capoeira musical instruments, where every participant sings the typical songs and claps their hands following the music. Two capoeiristas shake hands, enter the roda and play the game according to the style required by the musical rhythm. In the roda, capoeiristas perform various attacks and dodges; the game finishes when one of the musicians holding a berimbau determines it, when one of the capoeiristas decides to leave or call the end of the game, or when another capoeirista interrupts the game to start playing, either with one of the current players or with another capoeirista.

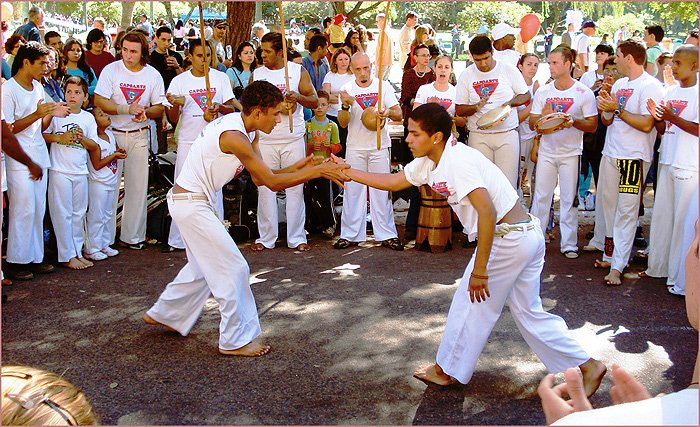
Capoeiristas in a roda (Porto Alegre, Brazil)

The batizado (lit. baptism) is a ceremonial roda where new students receive recognition as capoeiristas and earn their first graduation. More experienced students may also be evaluated and move up in rank. Students enter the roda against a high-ranked capoeirista (such as a teacher or master) and normally the game ends with the student being taken down. In some cases the more experienced capoeirista can judge the takedown unnecessary. Following the batizado the new graduation, generally in the form of a cord, is given. Traditionally, the batizado is the moment when the new practitioner gets or formalizes their apelido (nickname). This tradition was created back when capoeira practice was considered a crime. To avoid having problems with the law, capoeiristas would present themselves in the capoeira community only by their nicknames. In some cases, the nicknames have overtones of mockery, but they also carry affection and pride. Nicknaming was initially uncommon for female capoeiristas, although it has become typical.

Chamada means "call"; in capoiera Angola, this can happen at any time during a roda where the rhythm angola is being played. It happens when one player, usually the more advanced one, calls their opponent to a dance-like ritual; the opponent then approaches the caller and meets them to walk side by side, following which both resume normal play. While it may seem like a break time or a dance, the chamada is actually a challenge; both players are vulnerable because of the proximity and potential for a surprise attack. The chamada can result in a developed awareness, helping practitioners learn the subtleties of anticipating another person's hidden intentions. The chamada can be very simple, consisting solely of the basic elements, or the ritual can be elaborate including trickery or theatric embellishments. The volta ao mundo, meaning, "around the world," takes place after an exchange of movements has reached a conclusion, or after there has been a disruption in the harmony of the game; one player will begin walking around the perimeter of the circle counter-clockwise, and the other player will join the volta ao mundo in the opposite part of the roda, before returning to the normal game.

Professor Barrãozinho from Axé Capoeira performing a meia-lua de compasso against Keegan Marshall.

While capoeira is a game, it can be very intense; combat capoeira, often referred to as rough capoeira (capoeira dura), places a primary emphasis on combat. It is commonly observed in street rodas, and sometimes even in graduations within certain groups. In the words of Nanica, a capoeira teacher:

I think beating (pancadaria) is good. I learned capoeira being beaten up and I like a rough game, heavy game. Sometimes, when I receive a kick that breaks my mouth, my nose, I even like it because I am learning. Beating is important in capoeira. Pancadaria is not violence.

Several capoeira fighters have gained national reputation, including Mestre King Kong from Salvador, Mestre Maurão from São Paulo, and King from Rio de Janeiro; they advocate for capoeiristas to be skilled in playing intense games to ensure that the art retains its combat effectiveness. In the tradition of Sinhozinho and Bimba, contemporary capoeira fighters have expanded their training by incorporating various martial arts disciplines, including jujutsu, boxing, and taekwondo. Brazilian mixed martial arts champions like Marco Ruas acknowledge the significance of capoeira in their training. The use of capoeira techniques in free-style competitions shows to what extent the art still provides essential fighting skills.

Related art forms are often practiced at public capoeira performances. Samba de roda is a traditional Brazilian dance and musical form associated with capoeira. Maculelê is a stick-fighting dance with drum (atabaque) accompaniment. It is also based on a ginga step. Many capoeira groups include Maculelê in their presentations. Puxada de rede (pulling the net) is a Brazilian folkloric theatrical play, seen in many capoeira performances. It is based on a Brazilian fishing tradition.

== Techniques ==
Simple animation depicting part of the ginga

Capoeira is often said to be a martial art disguised as a dance. It is fast and versatile; the lower body kicks, sweeps and takes down aggressors, while the upper body assists those movements and occasionally attacks as well. It features a series of complex positions and body postures that should flow, strike, dodge and move with characteristic unpredictability and versatility. The fluidity of the movements requires mobility and flexibility. Capoeira movements are generally circular, rather than striking head on.

The ginga (literally "rocking back and forth"; "to swing") is the fundamental movement in capoeira, important both for attacking and defending oneself. It has two main objectives: one is to keep the capoeirista in motion, preventing them from being a still and easy target; and the other is to mislead, fool or trick the opponent, leaving them open to attack. Most capoeira attacks are made with the legs; there are several kicks, such as meia lua de frente (an arc kick), armada (a spin-kick), queixada (an inverse arc kick), chapa de costas (a back push kick), bênção (a front push kick), and meia lua de compasso (a crouch and spinning reverse kick). Capoeira regional also includes a martelo ("hammer") kick, similar to a roundhouse kick. In addition, capoeiristas apply takedowns such as the rasteira (leg sweeps), tesoura, arrastão, boca de calça, and vingativa. Capoeira can also include hand strikes such as galopante, godeme, and cutelo, although the Angola style generally bans them. The head strike (cabeçada) is an important counter-attack move. Capoeira also includes a bananeira, a handstand.

Defense relies on avoiding an attack using evasive moves, instead of blocking it. Dodges include cocorinha and resistência (two types of defensive crouch), queda de quatro (a defensive fall backwards on all fours), and esquiva (head and torso movement). A series of rolls and acrobatics, such as the cartwheels called aú or the transitional position called negativa, allows the capoeirista to quickly overcome a takedown or a loss of balance, and to position themselves around the aggressor to attack. This combination of attacks, defense and mobility is what gives capoeira its perceived "fluidity" and choreography-like style.

A capoeira movement (aú fechado) (click for animation)

=== Recognition of proficiency ===
Individual capoeristas generally strive to develop their own style, within the tradition they are trained. Nestor Capoeira teaches:

It is a task, and a lonely one, to find and develop your own style, breaking with the “correct” way of playing that you learned from your teacher, who many times presents himself as “owner of the truth.” But this can be done after one has experience and an idea of what capoeira is … maybe after ten or fifteen years of practice.

Capoeira has never maintained general agreement on a ranking system. Bira Almeida speaks of distinctions among discípulos (people who pursue capoeira as a supplementary activity to their general lifestyle), contra-mestres (capoeiristas who have achieved considerable proficiency and who instruct others in the tradition), and mestres (who have devoted their lives to capoeira). Some masters have established a system for their particular tradition. The most common system uses colored ropes, called corda or cordão, tied around the waist. The highest rank in capoeira is mestre or mestra (master), but different schools and traditions have distinct criteria for giving this title; in the 1960s, some young men took on the title when they were in their twenties, but it is now much more common to require a mestre to be at least 40 years old (or even 60 years old in some schools), with 25 years of capoeira playing as well as significant accomplishments in teaching it.

== Music ==
Music sets the tempo and style of game that is to be played within the roda; rhythms (toques) are controlled by an instrument called a berimbau, which has become the symbol of capoeira. The second most important instrument in capoeira is a pandeiro, a type of tambourine.

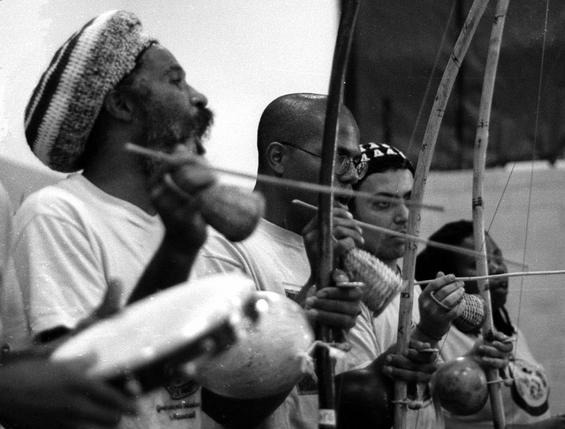
A capoeira bateria showing three berimbaus, a reco-reco and a pandeiro

Capoeira instruments are disposed in a row called bateria. Traditionally, it includes berimbaus, pandeiros, atabaques, and an agogô; the format may vary depending on the capoeira group's traditions or the roda style. The berimbau is the leading instrument, determining the tempo and style of the music and game played; the other instruments must follow the berimbau's rhythm, free to vary and improvise a little, depending upon the capoeira group's musical style. The capoeiristas change their playing style significantly following the toque of the berimbau, which sets the game's speed, style and aggressiveness. While capoeira regional is guided by one berimbau, the capoeira Angola bateria traditionally includes three of them.

Many of the songs are sung in a call and response format while others are in the form of a narrative. The lyrics that capoeiristas sing are stories about the beautiful history of capoeira, mythic legends, and other fun playful tales. The songs are sung in Portuguese and have a poetic melody to them, while showcasing the true intensity and power of the game. There are three basic kinds of songs in capoeira: The ladainha, corrido, and quadra. The ladainha is a narrative solo sung at the beginning of a roda; the players first observe while this is being sung. A second part of the ladainha is answered by the chorus; the corrido is a one- or two-verse song, first sung by a soloist and then answered; while the quadra is a song where the same verse is repeated four times, with chorus responses. The topics of capoeira songs can include a wide variety of topics, such as a historical fact, a famous capoeirista, trivial life facts, or hidden messages for players. Improvisation can be important; while singing a song, the main singer can change the music's lyrics to address something taking place in or outside the roda.

Capoeira music has influenced a number of contemporary Brazilian musicians, such as Naná Vasconcelos, Antônio Carlos Jobim, and Gilberto Gil.

== Philosophy ==
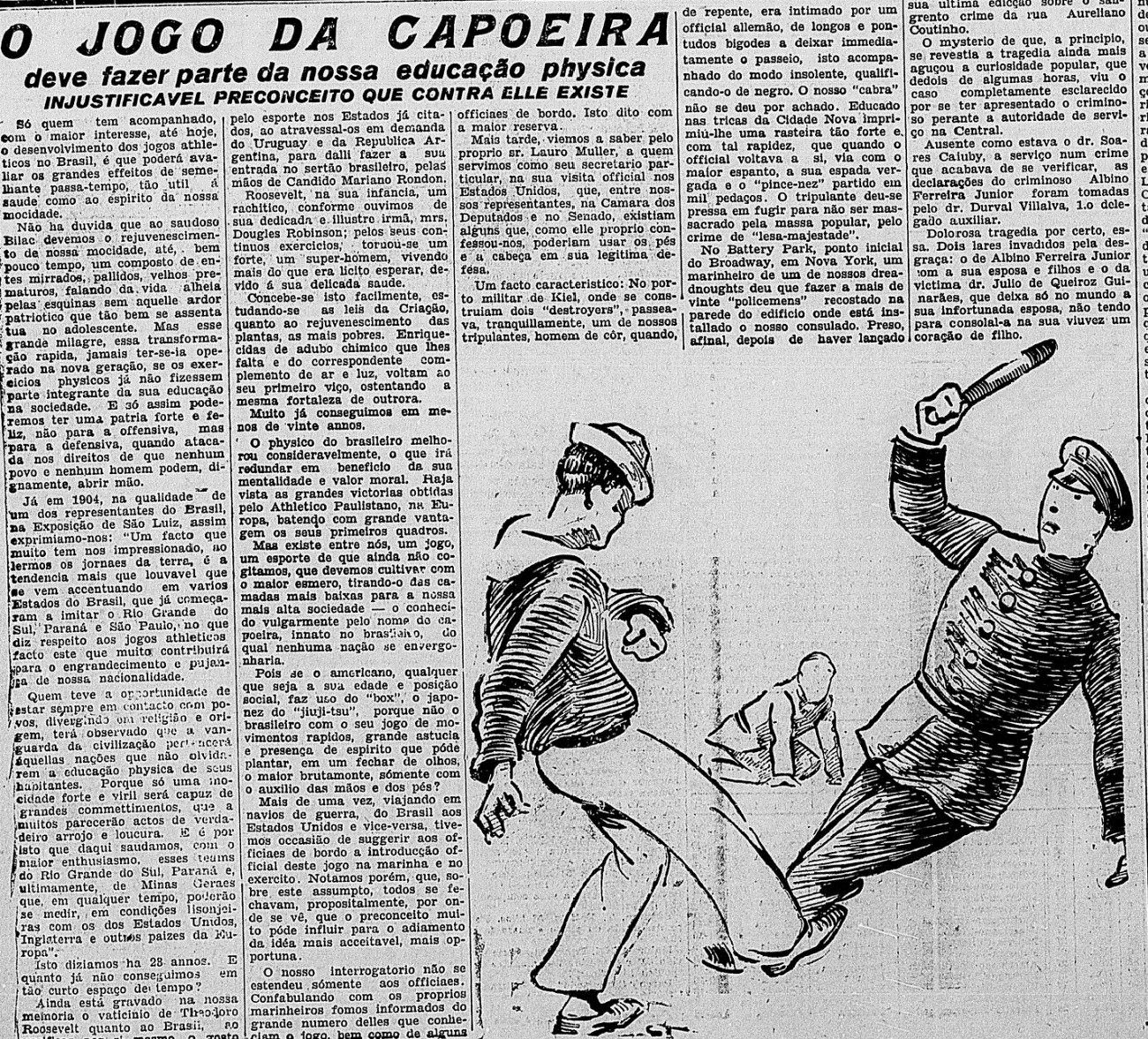
Diário Nacional, from 1927, shows a drawing of a sailor tripping a policeman, while another figure is already on the ground.

=== Malícia, malandragem, and mandinga ===
Capoeira is sometimes considered a way of life; when asked for a definition, Mestre Pastinha said "Capoeira is whatever the mouth eats." As capoeiristas move through esquivas (dodges), kicks, rolls, and ginga, they engage muscles throughout the body, developing balance as they shift their weight; they also develop flexibility by bending and twisting in the acrobatic moves. Capoeiristas develop persistence when they master the martial art, as well as adaptiveness, as they learn to respond quickly to their opponent's moves during combat. Some practitioners, such as Greg Downey, have drawn on phenomenology to describe the experience of capoeira, while others, notably Nestor Capoeira, have taken concepts from the post-structuralist philosophy of Deleuze and Guattari.

The capoeirista resorts to an endless number of tricks to confuse and distract his opponent. He pretends to step back but he returns quickly; jumps from side to side; lies down and gets up; advances and retreats; pretends not to see the opponent to deceive him; turns in all directions; and shrinks in a cunning and bewildering ginga.

— Mestre Pastinha

Mestre Bimba once declared that "capoeira is treachery." The basic term of capoeira philosophy is malícia, which refers to street-smarts (a cognate of the English word "malice", but the meaning is different). One aspect of malicia consists of deceiving the opponent into thinking that you are going to execute a certain move when in fact you are going to do something completely different, which can let a less powerful opponent get the upper hand in combat. There is an example of malícia of Besouro who once fell to the ground during a game, crying like a woman and begging for mercy. Mestre João Pequeno claimed that he teaches his students how to play capoeira, but they should learn malícia for themselves since it cannot be taught.

The meaning of malícia in capoeira has expanded over time to cunning, suspicion, alertness, readiness, flexibility, and adaptation. Basically, it is the capacity to understand someone's intentions and making use of this understanding to misdirect someone as to your next move. In the contemporary capoeira, this is done good-naturedly, contrary to what the word may suggest. Nestor Capoeira explicated malícia as follows:

I think malícia is not only to feign, to pretend that you are going to deliver a certain blow and do something else, but a system of signs and signals. It is as if you were casting a spell or a charm in order to build a specific reality, a seductive reality, during the game and also outside the roda in day-to-day life and in any type of struggle or combat.

Gregory Downey explains:

Malícia, not coincidentally, is the quality, or constellation of qualities, that the ideal capoeirista should most evidence in his or her everyday life: a combination of wariness, quick wit, savvy, unpredictability, opportunism, playfulness, viciousness, and a talent for deception. The ability to fool, distract, and deceive the opponent is the key to success. The basic movement in capoeira, the ginga, is a constant fluid movement backward and forward, and a good capoeirista will use malícia in the ginga to deceive his opponent.

The ginga is the first principle of capoeira and the embodiment of malice. The continuous, ceaseless bodily motion, known as gingar, is the principle that creates deception or trickery, catching the opponent off guard. The bênção kick, ironically named, reflects another form of malícia. Slave owners would gather slaves in the morning, often on Sundays, to offer blessings, despite their mistreatment. In a deceptive twist, bênção appears as a blessing but swiftly becomes an attack on the opponent's belly.

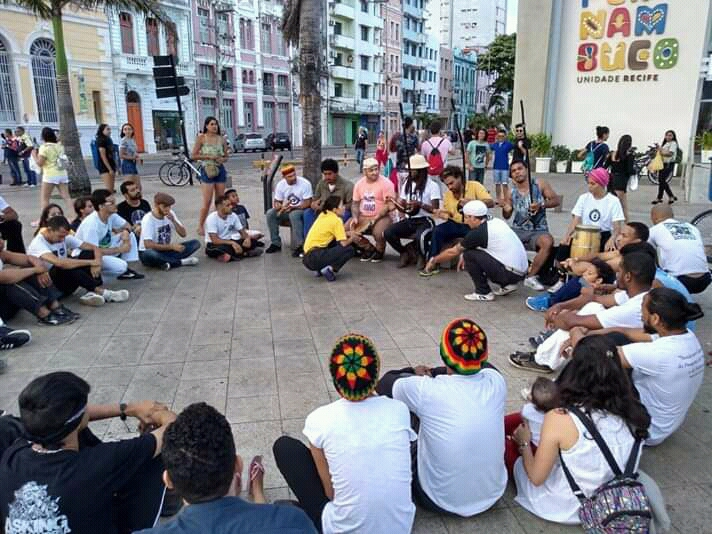
Capoeira Angola roda.

Malandragem is a concept derived from malandro, a man who used street smarts to make a living. In the 19th century, capoeira was quite similar to the type of urban person who was a constant source of trouble — the malandro (punk). In the 19th century Rio de Janeiro, the capoeirista was a malandro (a rogue) and a criminal, expert in the use of kicks (golpes), sweeps (rasteiras) and head-butts (cabeçadas), as well in the use of blade weapons. In capoeira, malandragem is the ability to quickly understand an opponent's intentions, and during a fight or a game, fool, trick and deceive him. A popular Brazilian saying, "Malandro demais se atrapalha" means that when one tries to be too clever or smart, instead of confusing his opponent, he confuses himself.

Capoeira draws on mandinga, which can be translated as magic, sorcery, or witchcraft. Mandinga suggests an understanding of fundamental natural forces and their utilization through magic rituals to some extent. In the past, capoeiristas used protective amulets and performed specific rituals to ensure their safety. Same players "do their mandinga" before the game by drawing magical symbols on the ground with their fingers. Some magic elements in capoeira are clear and familiar, while others have become obscure over time. Folklorist Edison Carneiro noted that the ladainha, sung before entering the capoeira circle, invokes the gods, adding a touch of mysticism to the ritual. Actions like touching the ground symbolize drawing signs in the dust, and gestures such as kissing hands, crossing oneself, and prayer are reminders of long-forgotten traditions, the Bantus' prayer for divine blessings, aid, and bravery in battle. Mandinga is also a certain esthetic, where the game is expressive and sometimes theatrical, especially in the Angola style. An advanced capoeira player is sometimes referred to as a mandingueiro, someone who embodies mandinga; the word mandinga originates from the name of Mandinka people.

Capoeira is slave mandinga, desirous of freedom.

Its principles have no method,

its aim is inconceivable even to the wisest of the mestres.

— Mestre Pastinha

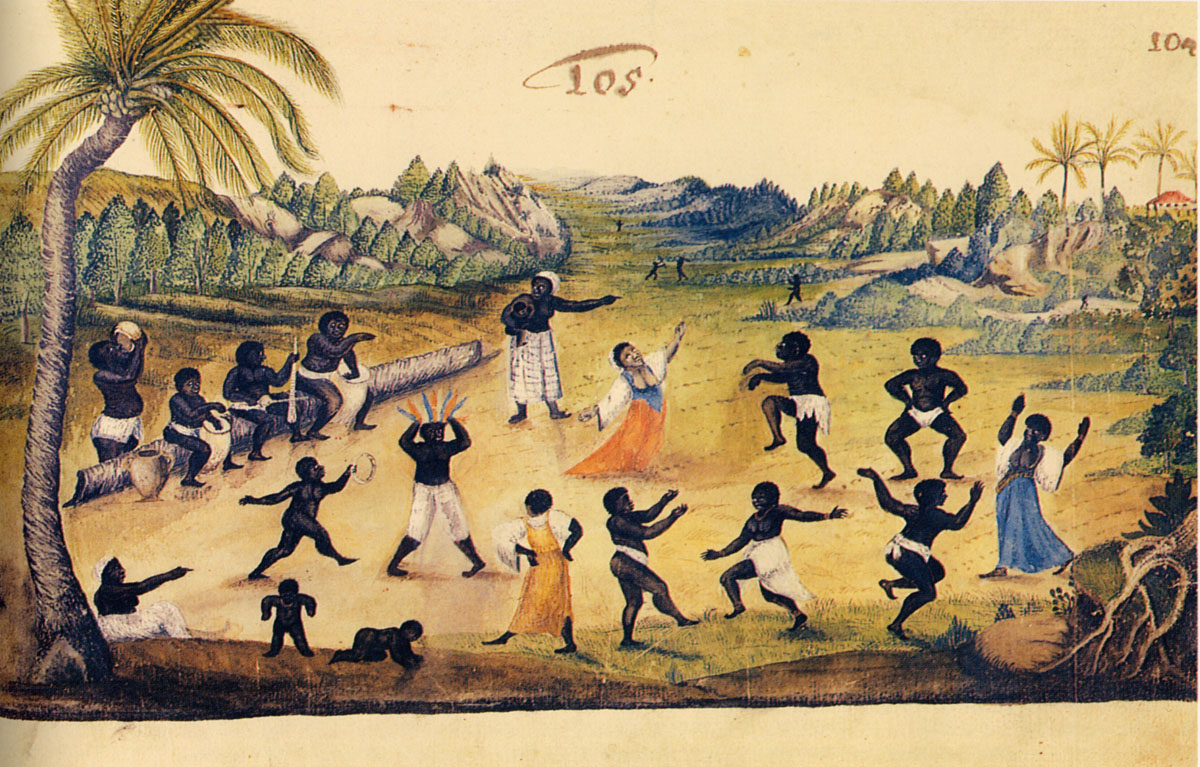
Divination Ceremony and Dance, Brazil, by Zacharias Wagener, 1630.

=== Afro-Brazilian and African spirituality ===
Capoeira can also preserve and transmit spiritual values and practices. Spirituality in capoeira is shaped under the influence of various African beliefs. Capoeiristas sometimes speak of "axé" or aché, a magic energy throughout nature. Axé comes from the Yoruba term asë. Capoeira has been additionally shaped by the cosmic worldview of candomblé, an Afro-Brazilian religion that has engaged with various manifestations of natural energies. The capoeira player in past usually had his orixá or santo (patron saint) as Ogum (the Warrior) or Oxóssi (the Hunter). Some important concepts of candomblé, such as dendé, a conception of energy, have become common among capoeiristas. Maya Talmon-Chvaicer, a scholar, suggests that capoeira could be understood in Bantu terms. Capoeira is a social expression that incorporates all the basic African elements: circle, dance, music, rituals and symbols; it also contains the ingredients of a game from the Kongolese perspective: a means to train and prepare for life. Within the Bantu culture, dancing in a circle holds significance, representing protection and strength, symbolizing the bond with the spirit world. Musical instruments connect the living, the deceased, and the gods; African dances customarily commence by paying homage to the primary instrument. This practice of tribute to the gods is mirrored in the capoeira tradition of kneeling before the berimbau during the ladainha. In Bantu religion, kalûnga represents the idea that, in the realm of the living everything is reversed from the realm of the ancestors. Inhabitants of the ancestral realm are inverted compared to us. Practitioners of African martial arts deliberately invert themselves upside down to emulate the ancestors, and to draw strength and power from the ancestral realm. A capoeira ritual is to perform the aù at the beginning of the game; this symbolizes a transition in Kongolese religion, where touching the ground with hands while feet are up in the air signifies the player crossing over to other worlds.

=== Debate regarding authenticity ===
Capoeira regional was the first tradition of capoeira to achieve legitimacy and cultural acceptance in Brazil, and tended to absorb other local styles. As a response, Mestre Pastinha's capoeira Angola rejected its innovations and adopted an Afrocentric approach meant to preserve musicality and self-expression rather than the perceived overemphasis on fighting effectiveness and athleticism in the regional style. Capoeristas associated with the Angola tradition even characterized the regional tradition as "whitening" of capoeira. In particular, the style of Grupo Senzala became a uniform standard in the 1970s and this restricted creativity and play. Nestor Capoeira and Bira Almeida have argued against the thesis that Mestre Bimba distorted or betrayed the original capoeira. Nestor Capoeira argues that Mestre Bimba's emphasis on combat effectiveness is closer to capoeira as it was documented in 1835, generally thought to be a "pure" form. He views the Angola tradition's emphasis on authenticity and origins as an invented tradition. Interpreters and practitioners in the regional tradition are more likely to credit the multiculturalism of Brazil as a significant ingredient in the development of capoeira; for example, Nestor Capoeira describes capoeira as "a dance-fight, a game that is a mixture of boxing, tai-chi, samba, American music" as well as dances and instruments from different African regions. However, Nestor agrees that the Senzala style had become stultifying, and welcomes the greater diversity and emphasis on anti-racism adopted in the mid-1980s. Capoeiristas of different traditions who may have philosophical disagreements play the game with one another, despite variations in method and understanding.

== Bibliography ==
- Almeida, Bira "Mestre Acordeon" (1986). Capoeira: A Brazilian Art Form. Berkeley: North Atlantic Books. ISBN 978-0-938190-30-1.
- Assunção, Matthias Röhrig (2002). Capoeira: The History of an Afro-Brazilian Martial Art. Routledge. ISBN 978-0-7146-8086-6.
- Assunção, Matthias Röhrig (2023). "Engolo and Capoeira. From Ethnic to Diasporic Combat Games in the Southern Atlantic". Martial Arts Studies (13): 6–26.
- Barbosa, Maria José Somerlate (2023). The Ripple Effect: Gender and Race in Brazilian Culture and Literature. Purdue University Press. ISBN 978-1612498522.
- Capoeira, Nestor (2002). Capoeira: Roots of the Dance-Fight-Game. Blue Snake Books. ISBN 978-1-58394-637-4.
- Capoeira, Nestor (2003). The Little Capoeira Book. Blue Snake Books. ISBN 9781583941980.
- Capoeira, Nestor (2006). A Street-Smart Song: Capoeira Philosophy and Inner Life. Blue Snake Books. ISBN 978-1-58394-155-3.
- Delamont, Sara; Stephens, Neil (2021). "The belts are set out: The batizado as a symbolic welcome to capoeira culture". Ethnography. 22 (3): 351–371. ISSN 1466-1381.
- Desch-Obi, Thomas J. (2008). Fighting for Honor: The History of African Martial Art Traditions in the Atlantic World. University of South Carolina Press. ISBN 978-1-57003-718-4.
- Diaz, J. D. (2017). "Between repetition and variation: A musical performance of malícia in capoeira". Ethnomusicology Forum. 26 (1): 46–68.
- Downey, Greg (2005). Learning Capoeira: Lessons in Cunning from an Afro-Brazilian Art. Oxford University Press. ISBN 978-0195176988.
- Downing, Ben (1996). "Jôgo Bonito: A Brief Anatomy of Capoeira". Southwest Review. 81 (4): 545–562. ISSN 0038-4712. JSTOR 43471791.
- Essien, Aniefre (2008). Capoeira Beyond Brazil: From a Slave Tradition to an International Way of Life. Blue Snake Books. ISBN 9781583942550.
- Gentry, Clyde (2011). No Holds Barred: The Complete History of Mixed Martial Arts in America. Triumph Books. ISBN 978-1-60078-545-0.
- Hart, Stephen M.; Young, Richard (2003). Contemporary Latin American cultural studies. London: Arnold. pp. 285–286. ISBN 0-340-80821-7. OCLC 52946422.
- Harte, Colin (2019). "Capoeira". The SAGE International Encyclopedia of Music and Culture. Vol. 5. doi:10.4135/9781483317731.n142. ISBN 978-1-4833-1775-5.
- Kambon, Obádélé (2018). "Afrikan=Black Combat Forms Hidden in Plain Sight: Engolo/Capoeira, Knocking-and-Kicking and Asafo Flag Dancing". Africology: The Journal of Pan African Studies. 12 (4): 327–363.
- Rashid, Kamau (2022). ""You've Got to Be the Medicine to Heal the Community": Capoeira and the Art of Healing Mind, Body, and Spirit". Journal of Black Studies. 53 (7): 746–759. ISSN 0021-9347.
- Schwarz, Lilia M.; Starling, Heloisa M. (2015). Brazil: A Biography. Farrar, Straus, and Giroux. ISBN 978-0-374-28049-9.
- Silva, Marcelo Moraes e (2024). "A construção de um improvável herói esportivo: o capoeira Cyriaco (1909-1925)". Tempo. 30 (1). doi:10.1590/tem-1980-542x2024v300104. ISSN 1980-542X.
- Talmon-Chvaicer, Maya (2004). "Verbal and Non-Verbal Memory in Capoeira". Sport in Society. 7 (1): 49–68. doi:10.1080/1461098042000220182.
- Talmon-Chvaicer, Maya (2008). The Hidden History of Capoeira: A Collision of Cultures in the Brazilian Battle Dance. University of Texas Press. ISBN 978-0-292-71723-7.
- Taylor, Gerard (2007). Capoeira: The Jogo de Angola from Luanda to Cyberspace. Vol. 2. Berkeley, CA: Blue Snake Books. ISBN 9781583941836.
- Varela, Sergio González (2017). Power in Practice: The Pragmatic Anthropology of Afro-Brazilian Capoeira. Berghahn Books. ISBN 978-1-785-33635-5.
- Vianna Neto, Eurico Lopes Baretto (2017). Capoeira and transnational culture: Investigating the social role of a globally mobile traditional cultural practice (PhD thesis). Australia: Griffith University.
- Wedsworth, Evan (2016). The Capoeira Guidebook: Investigations into the Culture, History, and Philosophy of the Afro-Brazilian Art. ISBN 9781523827381.
- Wesolowski, Katya (2023). Capoeira Connections: A Memoir in Motion. University of Florida Press. ISBN 978-1-68340-320-3.
- Willson, Margaret (March 2001). "Designs of Deception: Concepts of Consciousness, Spirituality and Survival in Capoeira Angola in Salvador, Brazil". Anthropology of Consciousness. 12: 19–36. doi:10.1525/ac.2001.12.1.19.
