= Atabaque =

Hand drum

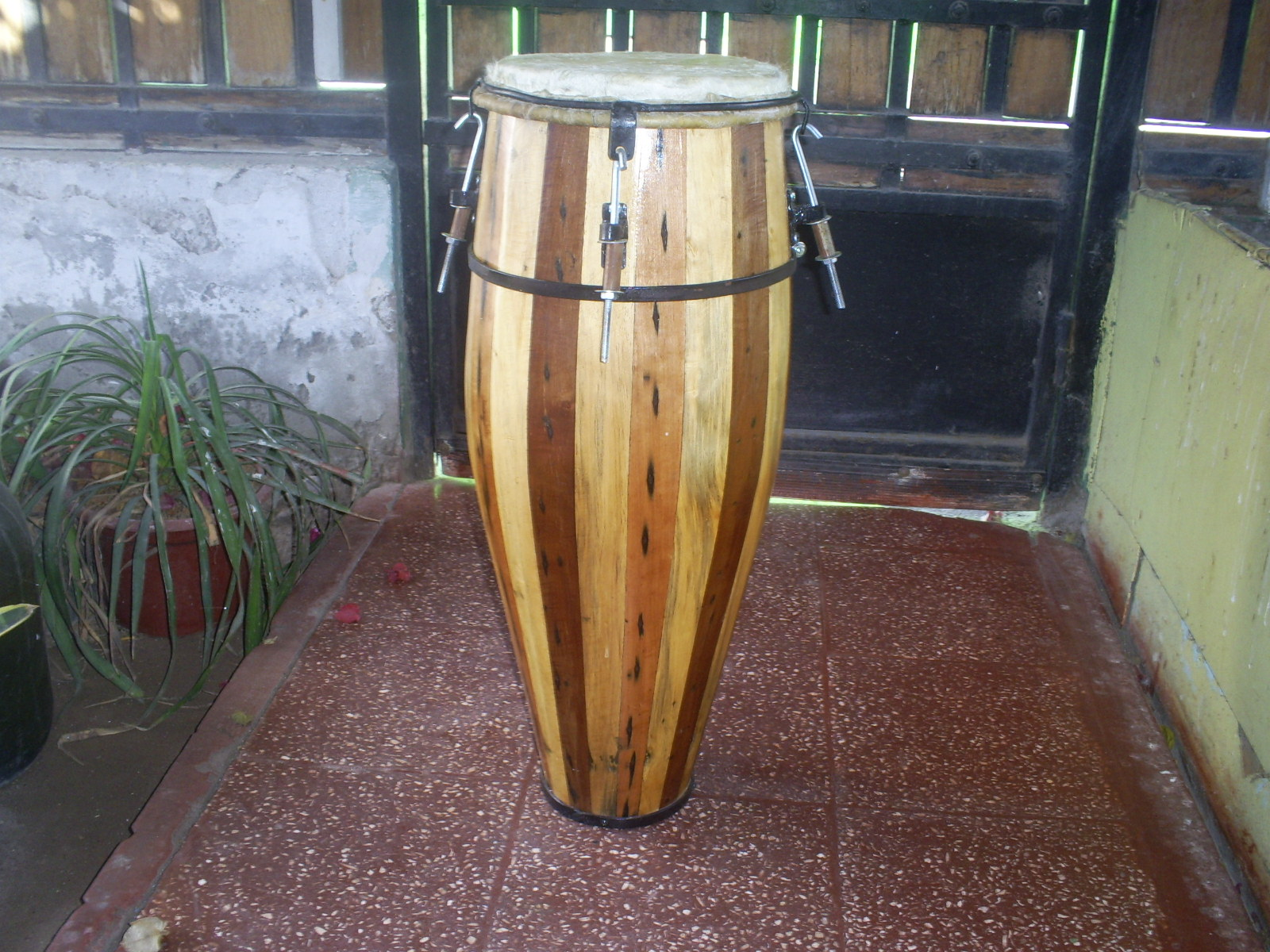

Percussion instrument
- Classification: Membranophone
- Hornbostel–Sachs classification: 211.221.1 (Barrel drum)
- Developed: Brazil

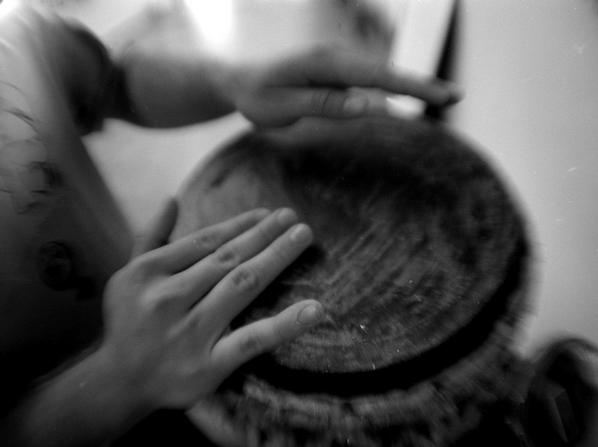
Drumming on an atabaque

The atabaque (UK: /ˌætəˈbæki/ AT-ə-BAK-ee, US: /ˌɑːtəˈbɑːki/ AH-tə-BAH-kee, Brazilian Portuguese: [ataˈbaki]) is a tall, wooden, Afro-Brazilian hand drum, similar to conga.

The shell is made traditionally of Jacaranda wood from Brazil. The head is traditionally made from calfskin. A system of ropes are intertwined around the body, connecting a metal ring near the base to the head. Because of this tuning mechanism the drum is sometimes known as 'Atabaque de Corda'. Wooden wedges are jammed between this ring and the body and a hammer is used to tighten or loosen the ropes, raising or lowering the pitch of the drum.

In Africa, cord-and-peg tension atabaques had a distribution area roughly congruent with the iron double bell (Agogo). This included the Guinea Coast from the Niger River and west to Benin, Togo, and Ghana. Beyond West Africa, cord-and-peg tension drums appeared in Bahia, Suriname, St. Domingue, Cuba, and the southern states of America. These drums traveled with the Ewe, Fon, Akan, and Yoruba people during the New World diaspora.

The atabaque is used in Capoeira, Maculelê and the Afro-Brazilian religions of Candomblé and Umbanda. It is considered sacred in Candomblé and Umbanda. The main instrument in Candomblé is the drum (Atabaque), skinned with cord-and-peg tension.

There are three types of atabaque: rum, the tallest with the lowest pitch; rum-pi, of medium height and in the middle pitch range; and lê, the smallest and highest-pitched.

In Maculelê and the rituals of Candomblé and Umbanda, as many as three Atabaques are used (usually one of each type), but in Capoeira, traditionally only one is used.

== Nomenclature ==
The atabaque has several distinct parts. Some of these are the couro de boi (oxhide), the corda (rope) and the aro (hoop), forming where together the corda de aro (rope hoop). The acunhas are the Wedges, and the suporte is the atabaque stand.

== Literature ==
- Capoeira, Nestor (2007). The Little Capoeira Book. Blue Snake Books. ISBN 9781583941980.
