= Mestre Canjiquinha =

Mestre Canjiquinha

Washington Bruno da Silva (1925–1994), known as Mestre Canjiquinha, was a Brazilian capoeira Angola mestre and a prominent figure in contemporary capoeira.

He was one of the few mestres who didn't emphasize differences between Angola and Regional style, viewing them as primarily different rhythms.

== Biography ==
Washington was born on September 25, 1925 in Barrio #6 in the center of Salvador, Bahia, as a son of a washerwoman.

He started in Capoeira in 1935, in Baixa do Tubo, in Matatu Pequeno. "In the bathroom of the late Octavian" (a public bathroom). He learned Capoeira with the legendary Mestre Aberrê (Antônio Raimundo).

Mestre Canjiquinha was a shoemaker, lunch box delivery man, and a typist. Among other activities, he was also a football player (goalkeeper) for the Ypiranga Futebol Clube, as well as a bolero singer on Salvadoran nights.

Even though he was not a student of Mestre Pastinha, Canjiquinha was Contra Mestre in his academy. Upon leaving, he founded, already as a mestre, his own academy. He was a capoeira visionary, he always told his students "Capoeira has no creed, no color, no flag, it belongs to the people, it will travel the world". He had a unique characteristic of playing the berimbau, an instrument he held in his right hand and played with the vaqueta in his left hand, keeping the berimbau at chest height. During his presentations, Mestre Canjiquinha didn't limit himself to showcasing capoeira but also incorporated other Afro-Brazilian dances, including maculelê. He claimed to be the first to integrate maculélé into capoeira demonstrations.

Mestre Canjiquinha played a pivotal role in shaping the style of mainstream capoeira that began to emerge in São Paulo during the 1960s. This evolving style, which emerged in the 1960s and 1970s, drew from both Regional and Angola styles while maintaining its distinct characteristics.

He recorded a CD with old Mestre Waldemar in 1984.

Like many others, he faced poverty in his later years. Mestre Canjiquinha died in 1994.

He left behind a legacy continued by talented mestres such as Paulo dos Anjos, Mestre Brasilia, and Mestre Lua Rasta.

== Movies ==
He appeared in several Brazilian films, promoting capoeira to a wider audience.

== Literature ==
- Assunção, Matthias Röhrig (2002). Capoeira: The History of an Afro-Brazilian Martial Art. Routledge. ISBN 978-0-7146-8086-6.

== See also ==
- Capoeira
- Capoeira Angola
