= Maculelê (stick dance) =

Brazilian folk dance

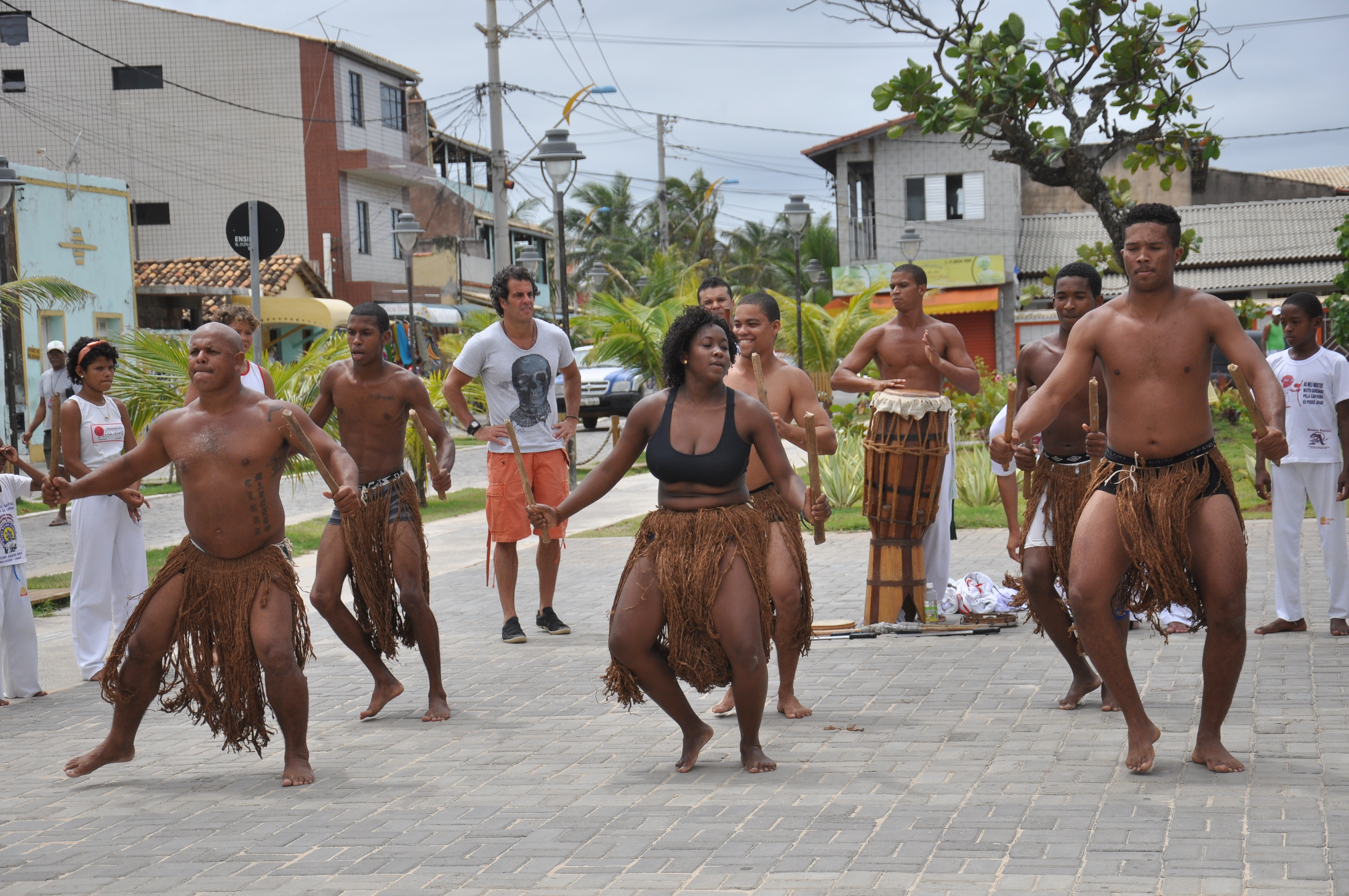
Maculelé in Arembepe

Maculelê (Portuguese pronunciation: [makuleˈle]) is an Afro-Brazilian stick-dance from Bahia.

Maculele, a stick fighting dance from Santo Amaro, was introduced to a wider audience by Viva Bahia, a capoeira theater group founded in 1963. Viva Bahia's founder, Emília Biancardi, had researched Bahian folklore for many years and integrated maculele into her group's performances. Major capoeira groups, such as those led by mestres Bimba, Pastinha, and Canjiquinha, soon adopted maculele as well.

== Origins ==
The German painter Rugendas observed African slaves stick fighting during the 1820s in Brazil:

It is also necessary to mention a sort of military dance: two troops armed with poles stand in front of each other, and the skill consists for each to avoid the thrusts that the adversary strikes at him.

That stick fighting and dancing have endured into the twentieth century through forms like maculêlê.

== Form ==
In the roda, one or more atabaques positioned at the entrance of the circle. Each person brandishes a pair of long sticks, traditionally made from biriba, canzi, or pitia wood from Brazil. The sticks, called grimas, traditionally measure 20–24 inches (50–60 cm) long by 1 1/8 inches (3 cm) thick. As the Maculelê rhythm plays on the atabaque, the people in the circle begin rhythmically striking the sticks together. The leader sings, and the people in the circle respond by singing the chorus of the songs. When the leader gives the signal to begin playing Maculelê, two people enter the circle, and to the rhythm of the atabaque, they begin striking their own and each other's sticks together. On the first three beats, they strike their own sticks together, making expressive and athletic dance movements, and on each fourth beat, they strike each other's respective right-hand stick together. This makes for a dance that looks like "mock stick combat". (Also, traditionally in Maculelê, the players wear dried grass skirts).

Maculelê has steps similar to many other Brazilian dances such as "frevo" from Pernambuco, "Moçambique" from São Paulo, "Cana-verde" from Vassouras-RJ, "Bate-pau" from Mato Grosso, "Tudundun" from Pará among others.

== Capoeira ==
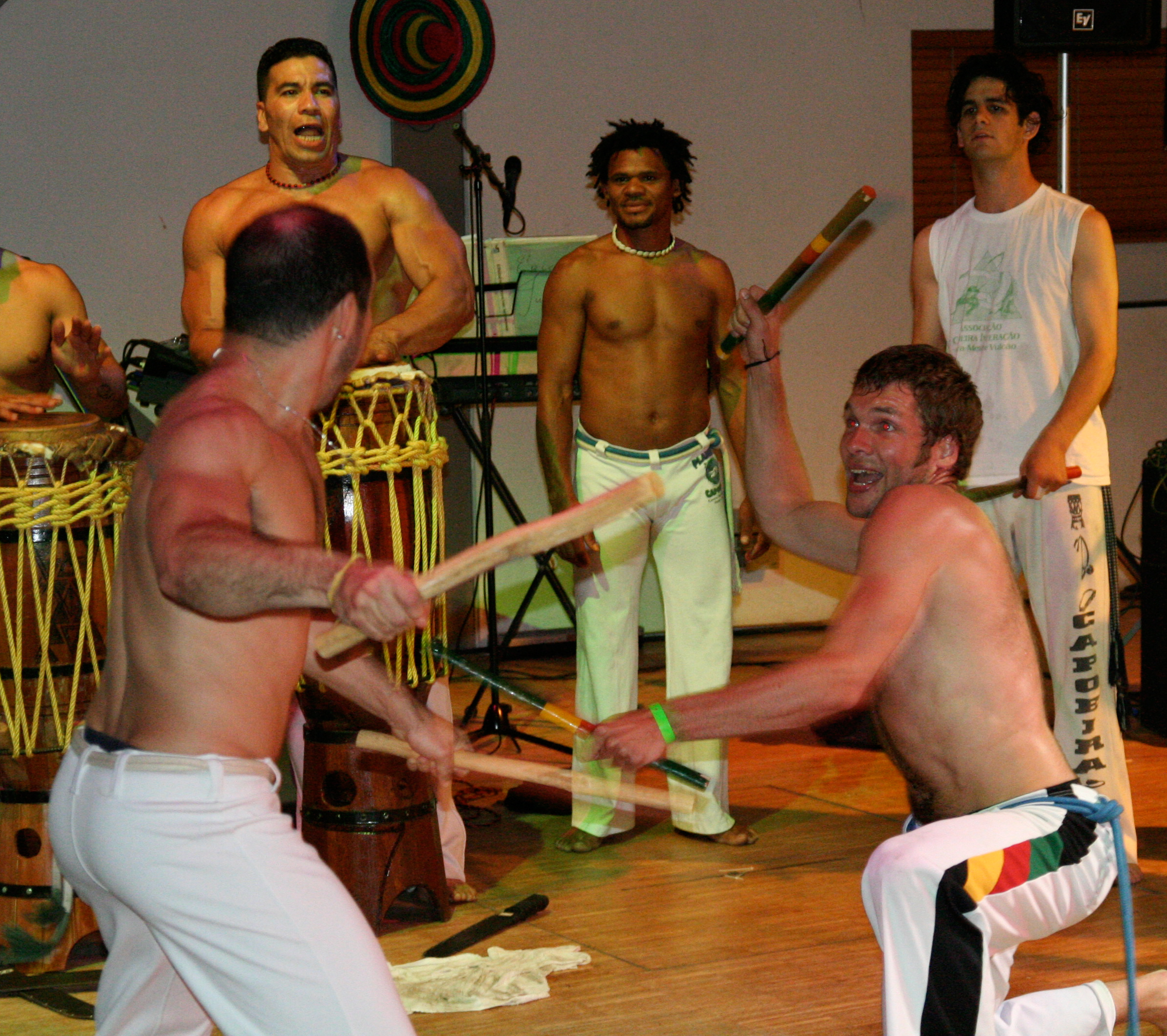
Maculelê performance in capoeira

In some capoeira schools, students perform maculelê using a pair of machetes or facones (facão in Portuguese; plural: facões). These large knives are associated with the tools used by slaves in plantations. The knives spark as they strike in the air, and the sparks along with the sounds of the knives striking one another make this performance particularly impressive. Because a fast moving dance with large knives is dangerous, only very experienced capoeiristas will use knives.

== In popular culture ==
Maculelê was performed as a group dance in the Canadian version of So You Think You Can Dance.

== See also ==
- Morris Dance
- Colombian grima, martial art sport using the related sticks and weapons
- Stick dance (African-American)
- Weapon dance

== Literature ==
- Assunção, Matthias Röhrig (2002). Capoeira: The History of an Afro-Brazilian Martial Art. Routledge. ISBN 978-0-7146-8086-6.
