= Jogo de dentro =

Style of capoeira

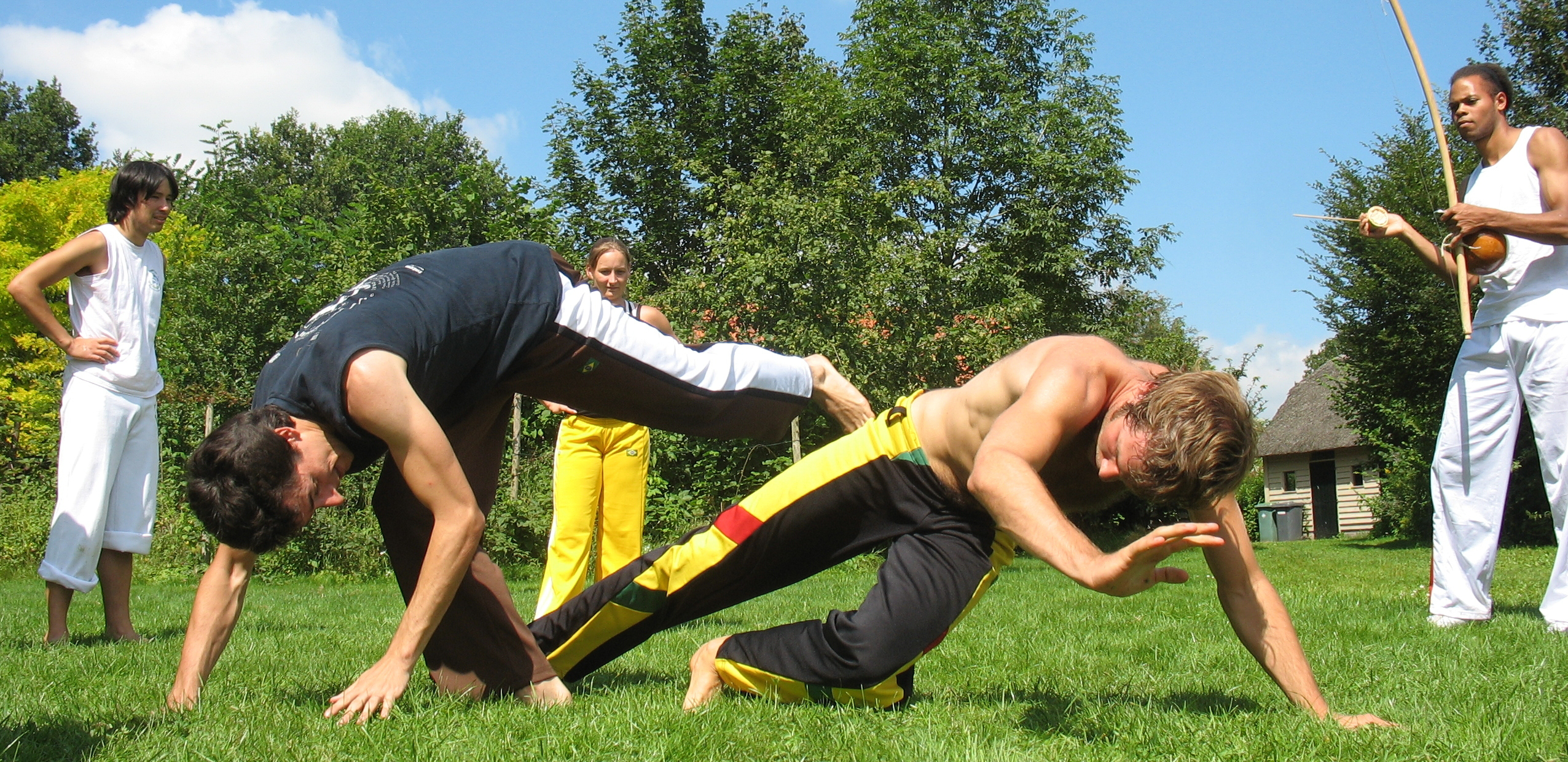
Wapse Capoeira Camping, jogo de dentro

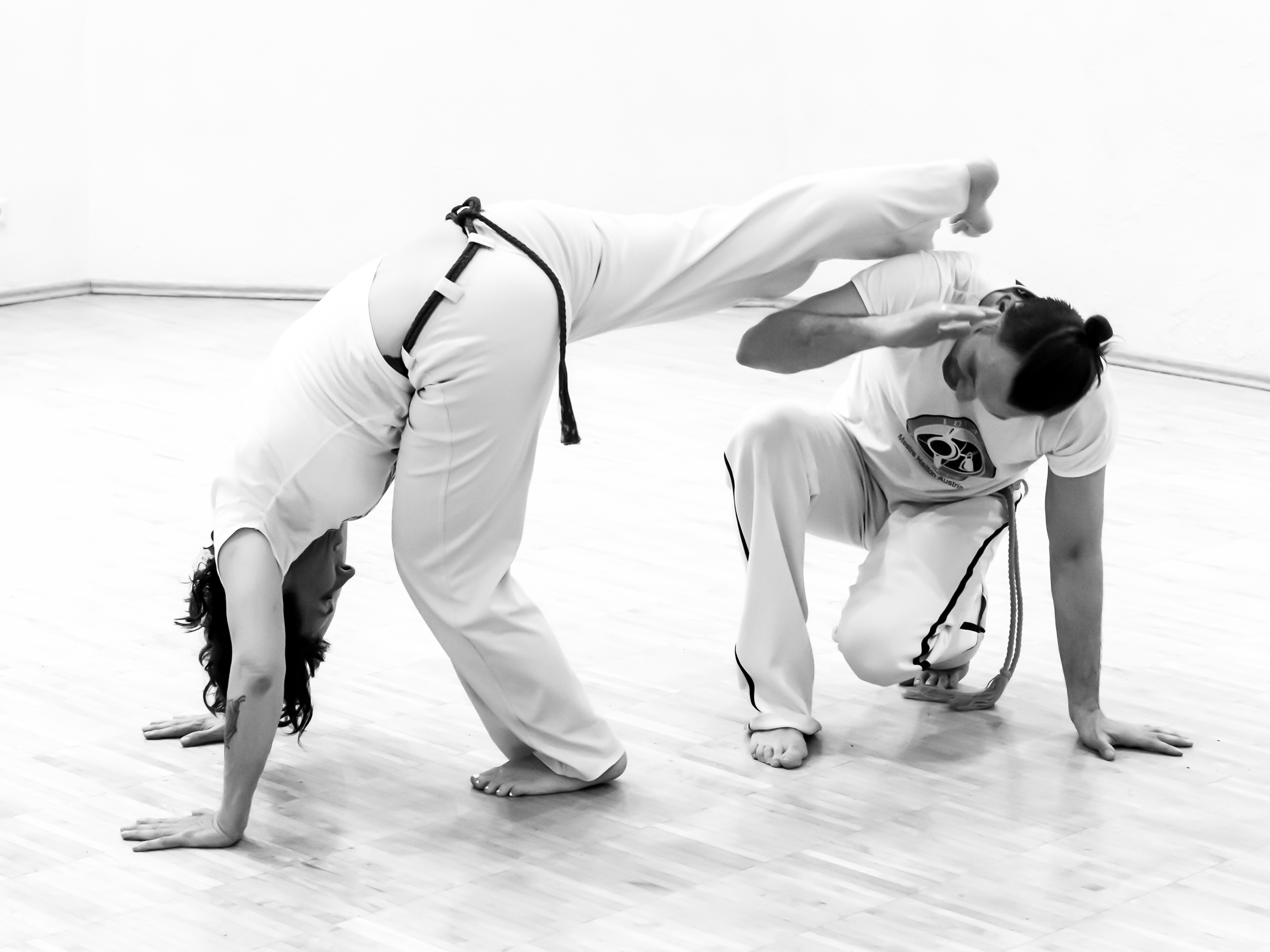
Rabo de arraia

Jogo de dentro (inner game) or jogo de baixo (low game) is the style of playing capoeira on the ground, involving low movements, with capoeiristas supporting themselves with their feet and hands only. The body should not touch the ground in this modality.

In “inside game” opponents are very close to one another. In this style of play, the cunning of the players, as they try to outsmart each other, finds significant application. The consequences of even a slight lapse in attention can be severe because, given their position, kicks to the head, such as the rabo de arraia, are more viable than when the fighters are standing. In the "low game," capoeiristas must always be vigilant towards their opponent, trying to discern their intentions or tricks in time. In friendly demonstrations, the strikes are delivered at a slow pace, allowing time for defense or ensuring they pass close to the target without making contact.

Low game is a major characteristic of capoeira Angola style. Mestre Pastinha wanted his students to improve their practice of the principal kicks (cabeçada, rasteira, rabo de arraia, chapa de frente, chapa de costas, meia lua and cutilada de mão), which allows a proper inner game to develop.

This style of play develops significant resistance in both the upper and lower body due to the substantial physical effort required.

== Literature ==
- Pastinha, Mestre (1988). Capoeira Angola. Fundação Cultural do Estado da Bahia.
- Assunção, Matthias Röhrig (2002). Capoeira: The History of an Afro-Brazilian Martial Art. Routledge. ISBN 978-0-7146-8086-6.
- Capoeira, Nestor (2002). Capoeira: Roots of the Dance-Fight-Game. Blue Snake Books. ISBN 978-1-58394-637-4.
