= Egg car =

Type of entrepreneurship

Egg car Fiat Fiorino (a common panel van in Brazil) crossing Lajeado, a Brazilian district in the subprefecture of Guaianases of the city of São Paulo.

Egg car is a type of entrepreneurship in Brazil characterized by the ambulant sale of large quantities of eggs at low prices in low-income neighborhoods through a car, often of the Kombi type, equipped with a loudspeaker.

At the same time, eggs are advertised with slogans such as "Attention, housewife. It's the egg car that's passing by your street [...]", the loudspeakers play popular songs, gospel music, and even chicken clucks, which can be adapted according to the target audience. In some cases the advertising message is itself sung, approaching a jingle format. In 2005, in Curitiba, for example, the following phrase was collected on an egg car passing through neighborhoods in the city: "Thirty eggs, thirty eggs only pays three reais. It's the egg car that is passing by [...]", and the phrase is repeated.

In 2020, during the COVID-19 pandemic in Brazil, this type of entrepreneurship became very popular, initially due to the layoffs caused by the pandemic, finding very favorable ground due to the high price of meat, leading to a higher consumption of eggs. Some vendors articulated sales through WhatsApp groups, reaching up to 2000 customers, also using a loyalty card system. Payment ranged from local currency to Pix transfers.

In the Quilombo do Orobu, in the region of Cajazeiras, in Salvador da Bahia, the popular and easily recognized by the community character of the egg car was used to advertise the personal protective equipment against COVID-19, being part of the strategy to contain the disease, with messages like "Covid came from China. Wear a mask and come get the egg!". The strategy posed the question of the need to interact with the community when it comes to promoting social distancing as a way to combat COVID-19. The thought that this distancing would prevent access to food items, such as eggs, generated a conflict that amped up the risk the community submitted itself to by leaving home.

In December 2020, the group Aparelhamento, a collective from São Paulo born in 2016, put on the streets of the city a van selling eggs from free-range chickens, 30 units for 10 reals, with the goal not to generate profit, but to encourage debate through questions of political nature and national relevance, such as "The egg car wants to know: why Queiroz was hiding in the house of the Bolsonaro family lawyer?". The questions were emitted by the van's sound system, surprising, cheering and revolting the São Paulo traffic, and generating repercussions in social networks. The sale of the egg itself was part of the message, being sold for a lower price than purchased, with the characteristic that they came from free-range hens. In addition, the eggs were boiled and distributed free of charge to homeless people by the same car. The word also had its function, playing on the similarity of "the egg wants to know", the motto used as an introduction to the questions asked by the megaphone, with the slogan, "the people want to know".
