= Capoeira Angola =

Traditional style of the Afro-Brazilian martial art capoeira

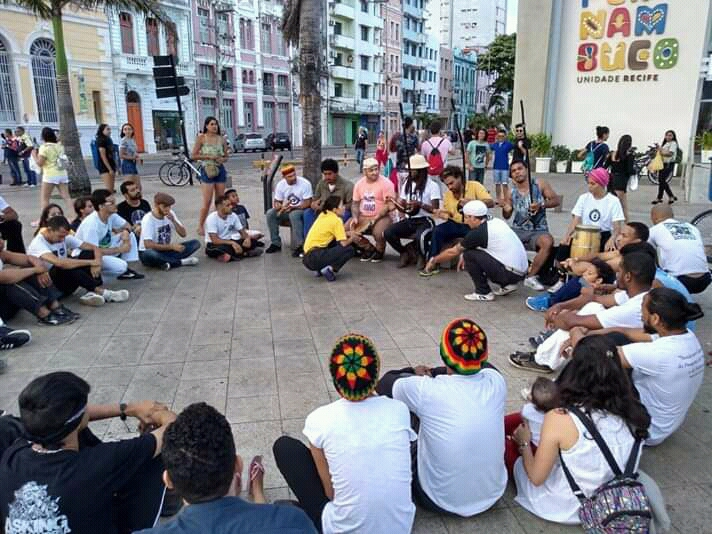
- Capoeira Angola roda in Recife, 2019
- Other names: angola, jogo de angola
- Martial art: capoeira
- Place of origin: Brazil, especially Bahia
- Date of creation: early 20th century

Capoeira Angola (also known as angola or jogo de angola) is a traditional style of capoeira, the Afro-Brazilian martial art. A newer style, developed through a reform of capoeira, is known as regional.

The term capoeira Angola can refer to both earlier forms of capoeira practiced before its 20th-century organization and the contemporary style developed and organized by Mestre Pastinha, who drew on older capoeira traditions.

Although Mestre Pastinha sought to preserve earlier capoeira practices, he also introduced significant changes, including restrictions on weapons and lethal techniques, the adoption of uniforms, the transition of training from streets to academias, and the inclusion of women. For Mestre Pastinha, Capoeira Angola remained "above all, fighting and violent fighting".

The practice of capoeira Angola combines martial techniques with chants, music, and cultural traditions, while emphasizing elements associated with older forms of capoeira developed within Afro-Brazilian communities.

Some practitioners and researchers have proposed connections between capoeira and the Angolan art of engolo, although the nature and extent of this relationship remain debated among scholars.

Capoeira Angola played an important role in the preservation and revival of traditional capoeira music, rituals, and practices within the broader capoeira community.

== Name ==
The name Capoeira Angola reflects the historical association of the term with Angola and with enslaved Africans and their descendants in Brazil who were involved in the development and transmission of capoeira traditions.

== History ==
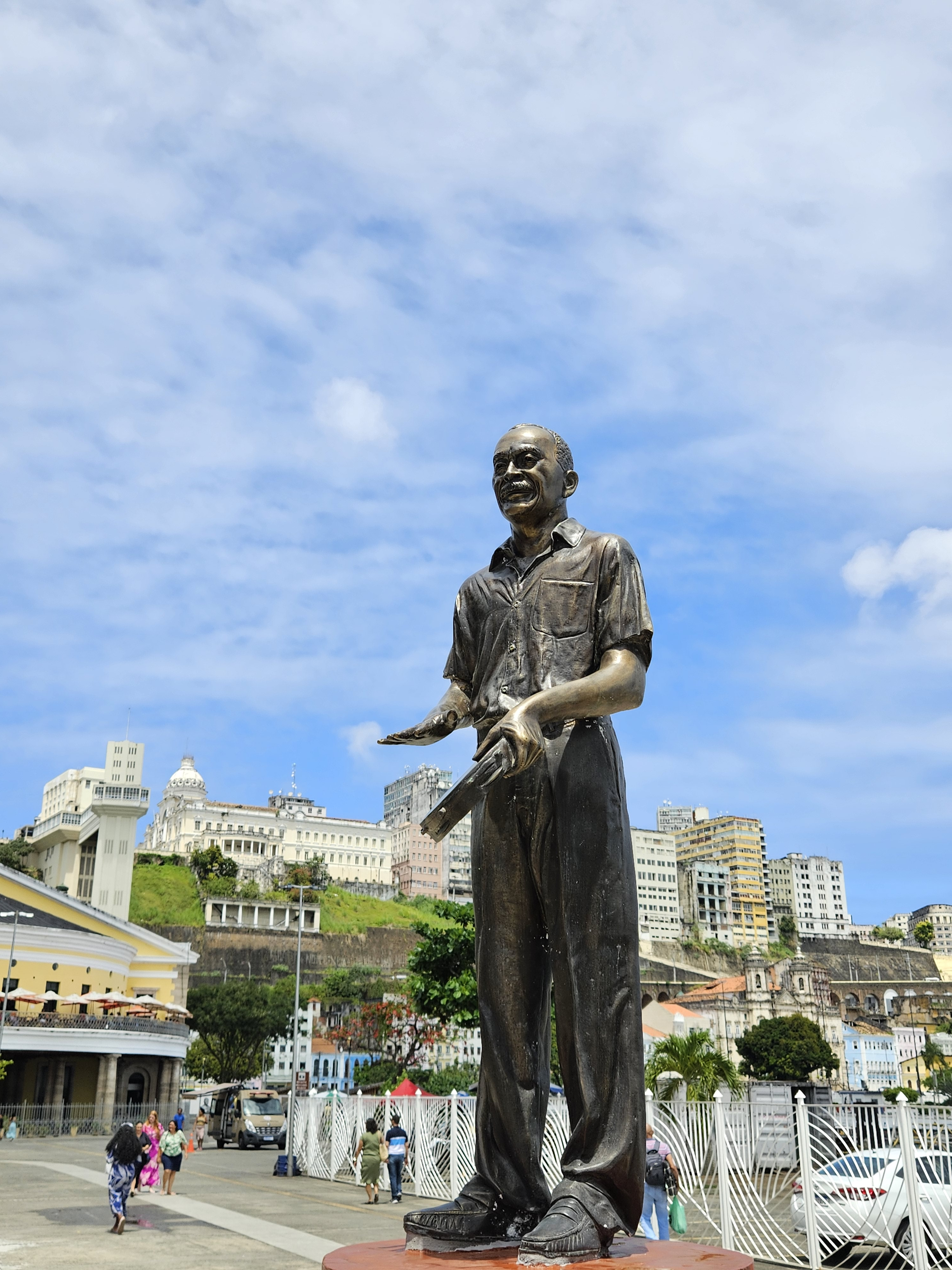
Statue of Mestre Pastinha at the Arena da Capoeira monument in Salvador

From its formation to the present day, capoeira has developed into different styles, each shaped by its own interpretations, practices, and interactions with local cultures. Today, these different approaches are represented by major traditions such as capoeira Angola, associated with Mestre Pastinha, and Capoeira Regional, associated with Mestre Bimba. Other less widespread approaches also developed, including Capoeira Utilitária, created by Mestre Zuma and Sinhozinho.

Capoeira Angola differs from Mestre Bimba's Regional by emphasizing connections with older capoeira traditions and by combining elements of fighting, play, dance, and expression. It places particular importance on mandinga (strategy, deception, and skill in the game) and is often characterized by a lower style of play, with movements performed closer to the ground and with coordinated use of different parts of the body.

The practice of Capoeira Angola emphasizes play, ritual, and the preservation of traditions, often featuring slower, more grounded, and more theatrical movements. In the roda de Angola, different groups maintain their own styles and interpretations while sharing common principles associated with the practice.

Capoeira Angola does not have a clearly defined date of creation or a single individual who can be considered its founder. However, Mestre Pastinha (Vicente Ferreira Pastinha, 1889–1981) is widely recognized as one of its most important figures. He promoted, organized, and helped establish Capoeira Angola as a recognized tradition, contributing to its preservation and public recognition.

Mestre Pastinha sought to preserve the characteristics he considered fundamental to Capoeira Angola while adapting its teaching and organization. Through his school, the Centro Esportivo de Capoeira Angola, founded in Salvador, Bahia, and through the training of many students, he played a central role in the transmission of the tradition to later generations.

Today, various organizations and groups dedicated to Capoeira Angola continue to practice and preserve its traditions. Like capoeira more broadly, Capoeira Angola has continued to evolve through the work of mestres and practitioners, maintaining historical elements while developing new expressions within contemporary culture.

=== First capoeira Angola center ===
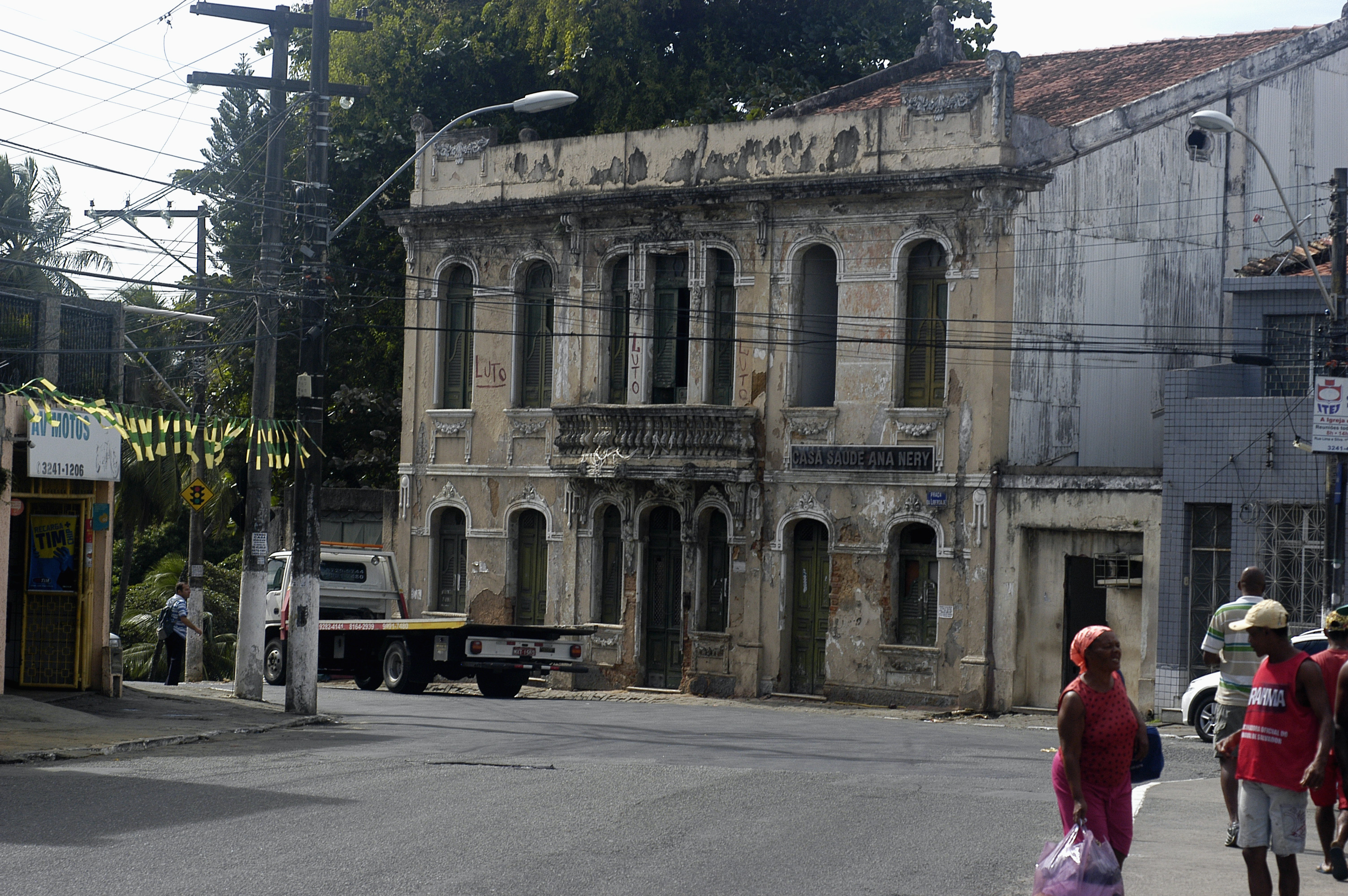
Liberdade neighbourhood in Salvador

During the 1920s, Mestre Noronha, his brother Livino, and other capoeira Angola mestres were involved in the organization of capoeira groups in Salvador, Bahia, including the Centro de Capoeira Angola at Ladeira de Pedra, in the Liberdade neighbourhood.

According to the manuscripts of Mestre Noronha, several capoeira mestres were associated with this group, including Noronha, Livino, Maré, Amorzinho, Raimundo ABR, Percílio, Geraldo Chapeleiro, Juvenal Engraxate, Geraldo Pé de Abelha, Zehi, Feliciano Bigode de Seda, Bonome, Henrique Cara Queimada, Onça Preta, Cimento, Algemiro Grande Olho de Pombo, Antonio Galindo, Antonio Boca de Porco, Candido Pequeno Argolinha de Ouro, Lúcio Pequeno, and Paquete do Cabula.

The colours of this centre were green and yellow, the colours of the Brazilian flag, and they were represented in the clothing worn by its disciples.

The group also maintained specific rules for capoeira Angola demonstrations:

The capoeirista who is defeated by a rasteira, a rabo de arraia, a joelhada, a balão boca de calças, or an escoramento de coxa is considered defeated. The adversary is considered beaten if he acknowledges his defeat immediately outside the demonstration. These are rules of capoeira Angola. The combat ring is 4 meters by 4, and there will be a capoeira Angola judge to evaluate which player is superior in attack.

=== Reform and legalization of capoeira ===
Since the early 20th century, many teachers tried to bring capoeira back into the legal framework. After several attempts to codify the street version of capoeira from Rio, mestre Bimba from Salvador reformed Bahian capoeira and codified it into regional style.

In early 1930s, Mestre Bimba developed systematic training method for capoeira, including kicks from other martial arts. He called it Luta Regional Baiana (regional Bahian fight), because capoeira was still illegal. In 1937, Bimba founded Centro de Cultura Física e Luta Regional, with permission from Salvador's Secretary of Education. His work was very well received, and he taught capoeira to the cultural elite of the city.

By 1940, capoeira finally lost its criminal connotation and was legalized.

=== Pastinha's capoeira Angola center ===
Centro Esportivo de Capoeira Angola
- Also known as: CECA
- Date founded: 1941
- Country of origin: Brazil
- Founder: Mestre Pastinha
- Arts taught: Capoeira Angola
- Ancestor arts: capoeira
- Ancestor schools: Centro de Capoeira Angola
- Practitioners: João Pequeno; João Grande

In response to a series of reforms, which changed capoeira considerably, Mestre Pastinha decided to preserve and popularize the traditional African style known as capoeira de Angola, from which the reformers distanced themselves.

In 1941, old capoeira Angola mestres who ran the first capoeira Angola center recognized a capable person in Pastinha and entrusted him with managing the center in Liberdade. That year, he legally registered Centro Esportivo de Capoeira Angola (CECA), in the Salvador neighborhood of Pelourinho, which attracted many traditional capoeiristas. He made his mission to clearly separate capoeira Angola from the violence. Pastinha adopted the colors of his favorite soccer club, Ypiranga, yellow and black, which became the hallmarks of the Angola style he taught.

Despite their significant differences, both mestres introduced major innovations – they moved training and rodas away from the street, instituted the academia, prescribed uniforms, started to teach women and presented capoeira to a broader audiences.

=== Academy period ===
Pastinha gathered a number of excellent players around him, not only because of his playing style but also his personal qualities. However, many capoeira Angola mestres including Waldemar, Cobrinha Verde and Gato Preto did not become part of Pastinha's school, and the art continued to live outside the academy as well. Mestre Waldemar regularly held his rodas in the neighborhood of Liberdade, during the 1940s and 1950s.

The traditional method of learning capoeira Angola, which persisted into the 1960s and beyond, relied on intuitive learning and observation. There was no structured training centered on repetitious movements. The angoleiros' efforts to distinguish capoeira Angola thwarted the attempts of the authorities in the 1970s to uniformize capoeira as the Brazilians' national sport.

In parallel, capoeira Angola began to lose popularity, and by the 1970s many angoleiros switched to Regional popularized by Grupo Senzala. Some of the old Angola mestres had retired and they no longer taught due to the lack of disciples.

But since the 1980s mainly the opposite seems to occur. After observing distinct angoleiro players from Bahia, regional players such as Marrom from Senzala in Rio de Janeiro, Deraldo in Boston and China in Barcelona have decided to become angoleiros. Since 1985, capoeira Angola experienced a revival with an influx of new students. Maybe due to increase in students, or perhaps to the success of the Senzala method, the Angola teachers adopted the new teaching method, including warm-ups, structured sequences of movements, uniform execution of kicks, and more. As a result, contemporary angoleiros from a particular academy tend to exhibit a uniform style of play.

Around 2010, mestre Cobra Mansa and few other capoeira Angola players went on a research trip to Angola, searching for the roots of the game. There they found players of the nearly extinct engolo game and played joint capoeira-engolo games with them.

== Music ==
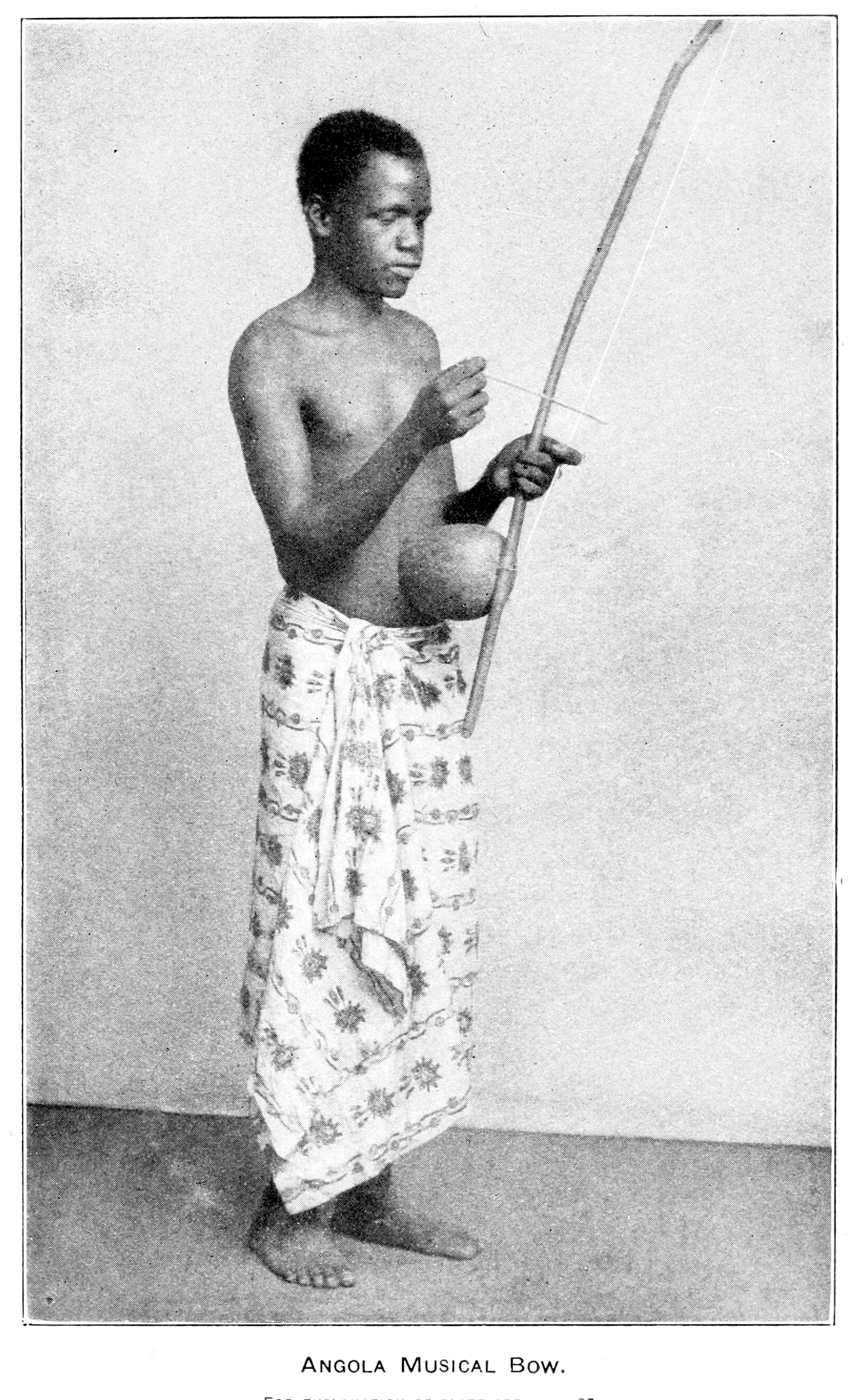
Angola musical bow (1922), known as berimbau in Brazil

Traditionally, capoeira in Bahia was exclusively accompanied by a large Bantu drum, which had been targeted by police repression in the 19th century. In the early 20th century, the most significant musical change was the shift from the drum to the berimbau, becoming the primary instrument in capoeira. The transition may have been influenced not only by musical preferences but also by the berimbau's dual role as a weapon.

Before the mid-20th century, various combinations of instruments were used in capoeira Angola. Muniz Sodré wrote that in Santo Amaro, capoeira music was played to the sound of a small guitar.

Mestre Pastinha formalized the instruments of capoeira Angola orchestra in his academy. He experimented with various instruments, occasionally incorporating guitars (viola de corda) and even introducing Spanish castanets into the roda. The current standardized formation of three berimbaus, two pandeiros, one agogô, one reco-reco, and one atabaque likely did not become established until the 1960s. Although, in mestre Waldemar's rodas, they did not have atabaque, a big drum.

Today, typical bateria formation in capoeira Angola is three berimbaus, two pandeiros, one atabaque, one agogô and one ganzuá.

The rhythms Angola and São Bento Grande were just two among many others used in traditional capoeira. Pastinha based his style on the slower Angola rhythm, while Mestre Bimba preferred the faster São Bento Grande, although both used a wide range of toques. Today, capoeira Angola music is generally slow.

== Techniques ==
Capoeira Angola actually has a small number of moves compared to some other martial arts. According to mestre Pastinha, the principal kicks of capoeira Angola are:

- cabeçada
- rasteira
- rabo de arraia
- chapa de frente
- chapa de costas
- meia lua
- cutilada de mão

In Capoeira Angola, there are a limited number of kicks, but each blow has numerous modalities depending on where it is applied. Every strike has variations, so what at first glance seems simple becomes complex.

This basic techniques allows a proper jogo de dentro (inner game) to develop.

== Characteristics ==
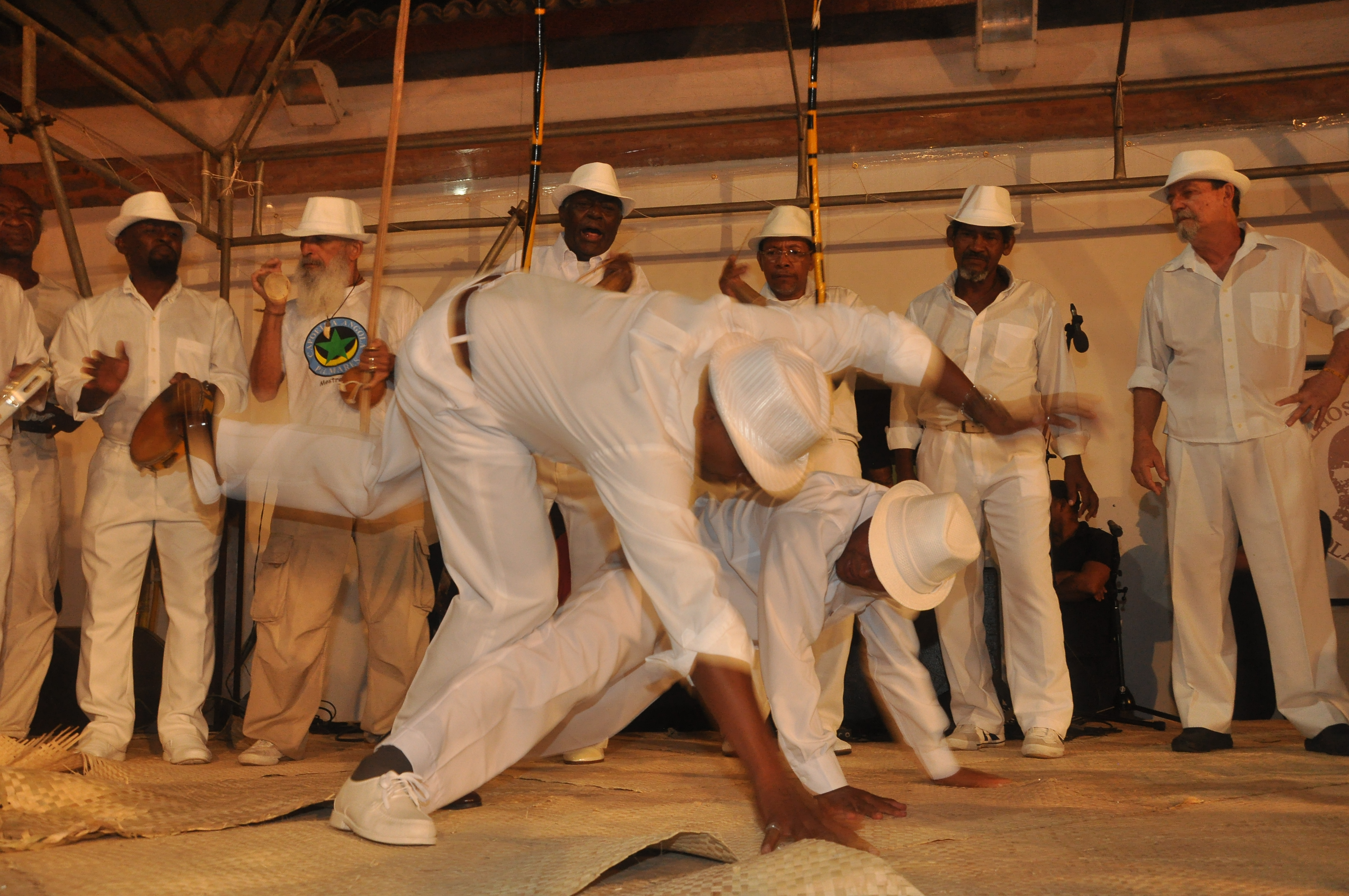
Encontro das Culturas Negras, Bahia 2012. Roda of old mestres.

Capoeira Angola emphasizes slower, ground-level game. The games in capoeira Angola last long, sometimes over ten minutes, enabling a more extended dialogue among participants. Capoeira Angola rodas can last anywhere from two to five hours. Some rodas in Salvador are known to be dangerous, while others are considered to be mild.

Practically, there is no age limit for entering a Capoeira Angola academy. In Pastinha's academy, there was a very high number of people over 60 years of age who have practiced capoeira, with impressive joint agility and flexibility. This approach shares similarities with African dances, which encourage individuals to dance according to their abilities. In Africa, dance is accessible to everyone.

Capoeira Angola is characterized by strategic play, deceptive movements, and the traditions of malícia, malandragem, and unpredictability associated with older capoeira practices. The anthropologist Alejandro Frigerio defines Capoeira Angola as an art form, in contrast to capoeira Regional, which he describes as a sport. He emphasizes the following characteristics of contemporary Capoeira Angola: cunning, complementation (the interaction between the two players' movements), a low game, the absence of violence, beautiful movements (according to a "black aesthetic"), slow music, and the importance of ritual and theatricality.

Despite its playful appearance, capoeira Angola is always a potentially violent art form. Old mestres teach that capoeira Angola is "the art of fighting with a smile", but they also emphasize the importance of being prepared to defend oneself.

Capoeira Angola is inextricably linked to African religious and ideological beliefs. Many capoeira Angola mestres in Bahia had a connection to the candomblé religion.

== Clothing ==
Unlike many other capoeira groups that play barefoot, angoleiros always train with shoes. When it comes to the color of the uniforms, there is a lack of uniformity within the style. Although mestre Pastinha at his academy required students to wear yellow and black jerseys, some of his successors have adopted white only uniforms within their schools.

== Angoleiro identity ==
There exists a significant discrepancy between how some capoeira players define themselves and how others categorize them. Determining who qualifies as an angoleiro, for example, is far from straightforward. Those who were students of Pastinha and later became mestres are widely acknowledged as the central figures in the Angola style. This recognition also extends to disciples of other renowned mestres like Cobrinha Verde or Waldemar.

However, beyond this core group, many other capoeiristas claims to be angoleiros as well. Their assertion faces challenges from dedicated angoleiros on two fronts: lineage and technique. Capoeiristas who have practiced different styles for an extended period and then decide to switch to Angola are often viewed with disapproval and labeled as regional.

== Interpretations ==
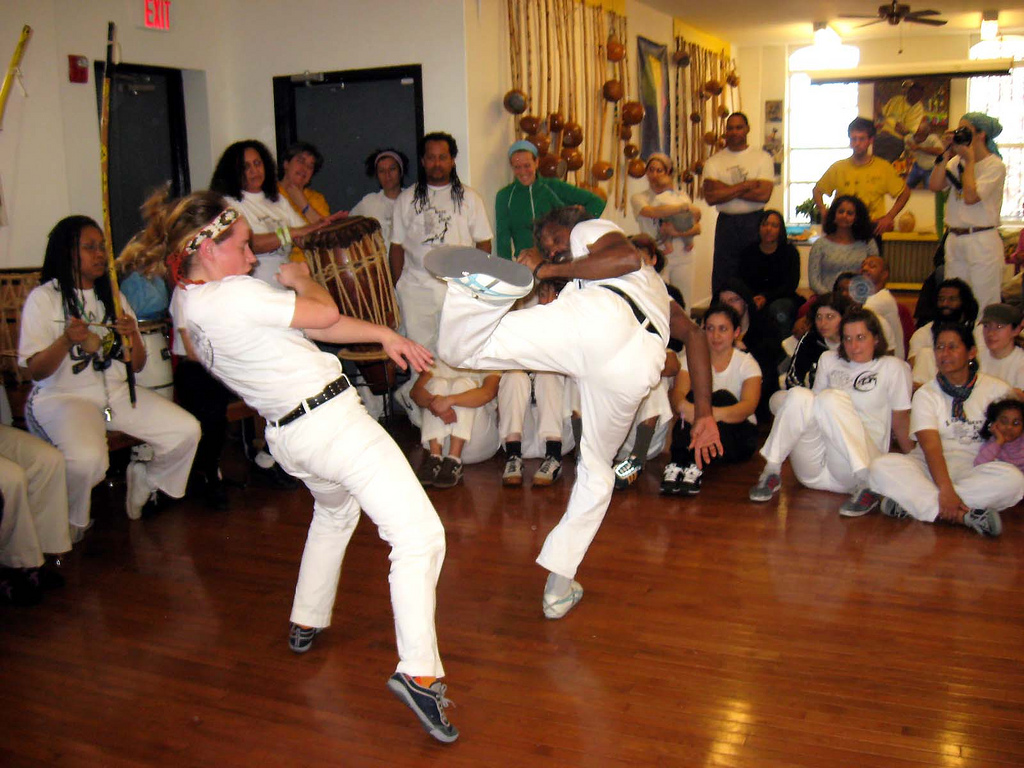
Mestre Cobra Mansa (the one kicking) playing a capoeirsta in a roda of the 10th Annual FICA Women's Conference 2008 Washington D.C.

[As engolo], nineteenth-century capoeira was also played from a more erect position and the ground game was probably only developed later on the flat and stony surfaces of squares and piers in Brazilian port cities. Hence the game on the ground which is so iconic of the Angola style – reputed to be more African – is probably and ironically less African than the exchanges of blows from a standing position, often seen as a Western innovation.

— Professor Matthias Röhrig Assunção

Assunção points out that because capoeira Angola has evolved in contrast to Regional, there is a tendency to "purify" it of all the elements perceived as Regional, even if they come from old Angola. It seems that capoeira Angola has evolved into a significantly positive reference in mainstream capoeira. It's viewed as synonymous with the roots of capoeira. So, angoleiro mestres are frequently invited to Regional events, yet the reverse rarely happens because Regional mestres are not considered to have competence in Angola circles. So, while Angola is considered the mother of Regional, Regional has become a kind of devil for many angoleiros, who dislike "aggressive" games and "violence".

== Notable mestres ==
- Mestre Pastinha
- Mestre Waldemar
- Mestre Gato Preto
- Mestre Cobrinha Verde
- Mestre Noronha
- Mestre João Pequeno
- Mestre João Grande
- Mestre Aberrê
- Mestre Curió
- Mestre Braga
- Mestre Pé de Chumbo
- Mestre Nô
- Mestre Canjiquinha
- Mestre Moraes
- Mestre Cobra Mansa
- Mestre Jogo de Dentro

== See also ==
- Capoeira
- History of capoeira
- Engolo

== Literature ==
- Pastinha, Mestre (1988). Capoeira Angola. Fundação Cultural do Estado da Bahia.
- Assunção, Matthias Röhrig (2002). Capoeira: The History of an Afro-Brazilian Martial Art. Routledge. ISBN 978-0-7146-8086-6.
- Capoeira, Nestor (2002). Capoeira: Roots of the Dance-Fight-Game. Blue Snake Books. ISBN 978-1-58394-637-4.
- Talmon-Chvaicer, Maya (2008). The Hidden History of Capoeira: A Collision of Cultures in the Brazilian Battle Dance. University of Texas Press. ISBN 978-0-292-71723-7.
- Desch-Obi, M. Thomas J. (2008). Fighting for Honor: The History of African Martial Art Traditions in the Atlantic World. Columbia: University of South Carolina Press. ISBN 978-1-57003-718-4.
- Varela, Sergio González (2017). Power in Practice: The Pragmatic Anthropology of Afro-Brazilian Capoeira. Berghahn Books. ISBN 9781785336355.
