= Mestre Noronha =

Capoeira Angola mestres

Mestre Noronha

Daniel Coutinho, known as Mestre Noronha (1909–1977) was one of the old capoeira Angola mestres, from the time when capoeira was an illegal martial art.

Mestre Noronha was one of the founders of the first Centre of Capoeira Angola in Liberdade neighbourhood of Salvador, Bahia in 1920s. He was often persecuted by the police as a capoeira practitioner.

== Biography ==
Daniel Coutinho was born on 3 August 1909 in Salvador, Bahia, in the lower area of Sapateiros, as a son of José Coutinho and Maria Conceição. He considered himself educated, as he knew how to read and write.

=== Capoeira practice ===
In 1917, when he was 8 years old, he started learning illegal capoeira then with "the champion of capoeira in the State of Bahia", mestre Cândido Pequeno in Beco de Xaréu. The same year they received an invitation to a roda at Curva Grande, which turned out to be a hostile event filled with tough individuals. These men had been trained to attack them with the help of the police and were under the command of a Military Police sergeant. The situation escalated further as the cavalry and additional police forces intervened, resulting in a clash between the police and the capoeiristas. The capoeiristas were ultimately detained, seemingly lured into a trap.

The capoeira player is not a tough guy and should not be, because the capoeirista has a lot of resources to fight, to be very calm.

=== Capoeira Angola center ===
I was a shoeshine boy to be able to live. My life as a capoeira angola master was very good, but I acquired nothing in life.

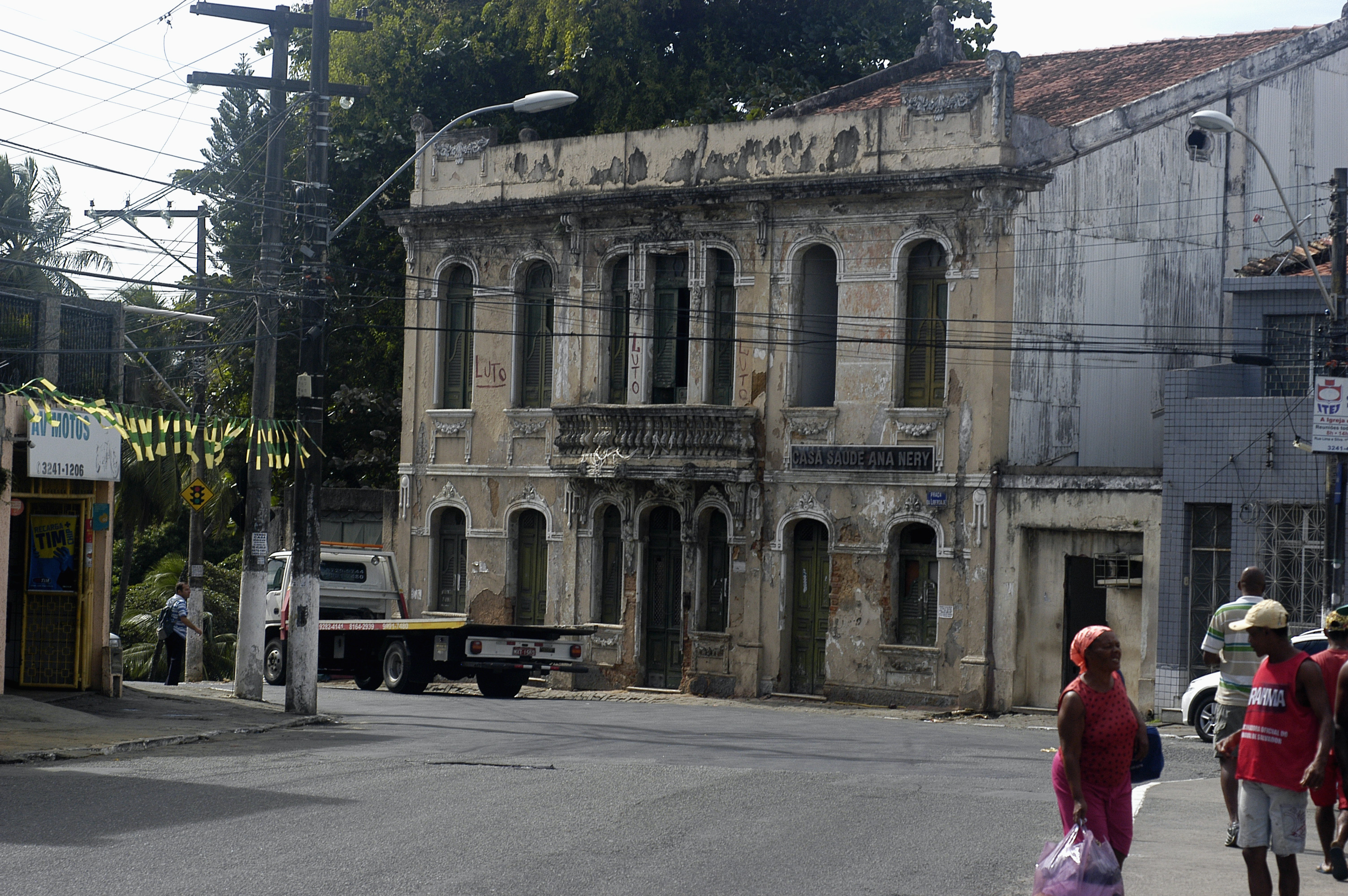
Liberdade neighbourhood in Salvador

During the 1920s, Noronha, his brother Livino and many other capoeira Angola mestres, founded the Centro de Capoeira Angola at Ladeira de Pedra, Liberdade neighbourhood, in Salvador, Bahia. Founding mestres were: Noronha, Livino, Maré, Amorzinho, Raimundo ABR, Percílio, Geraldo Chapeleiro, Juvenal Engraxate, Geraldo Pé de Abelha, Zehi, Feliciano Bigode de Seda, Bonome, Henrique Cara Queimada, Onça Preta, Cimento, Algemiro Grande Olho de Pombo longshoreman, Antonio Galindo, Antonio Boca de Porco stevedore, Candido Pequeno Argolinha de Ouro champion of Bahia, Lúcio Pequeno, Paquete do Cabula. The colours of this centre were green and yellow, the colours of the Brazilian flag, and they were symbolized on the clothes worn by the disciples. There were clear combat rules in their capoeira Angola center:

The capoeirista who is dragged by a rasteira in a demonstration or a rabo de arraia or a joelhada or a balão boca de calças or a escoramento de coxa is considered defeated. The adversary is considered beaten if acknowledging his defeat immediately outside the demonstration. These are rules of capoeira angola. The combat ring is 4 meters by 4, there will be a capoeira angola judge to judge the angola player who is superior in attack.

In 1941, together with other mestres, he handed their Centro Nacional de Capoeira de Origem Angola in Liberdade to Mestre Pastinha.

Then ABR introduced Mestre Pastinha. Because of the death of Amorzinho, the guard, we handed over the Centre to Mestre Pastinha to take care and this Centre was registered by the efforts of Mestre Pastinha, who knew how to raise this Center to prominence, thanks to the Good Lord, to this Spirit of Light that guided Mestre Pastinha.

=== Later years ===
He worked various jobs, including being a shoeshine boy, stevedore, dock worker, ragpicker, shipboard worker, truck driver assistant, street porter, and in the petrol industry. He eventually retired through his trade union.

In 1968, Noronha participated in Jair Moura's film called Dança de Guerra. In 1976, he completed his book, publish posthumously under the name O ABC da Capoeira Angola - Os Manuscritos do Mestre Noronha, in 1993.

Mestre Noronha died on 17 November 1977.

== Works ==
- O ABC da Capoeira Angola - Os Manuscritos do Mestre Noronha

== See also ==
- Capoeira Angola
- Mestre Pastinha
