= Ilê Aiyê =

Brazilian carnival block

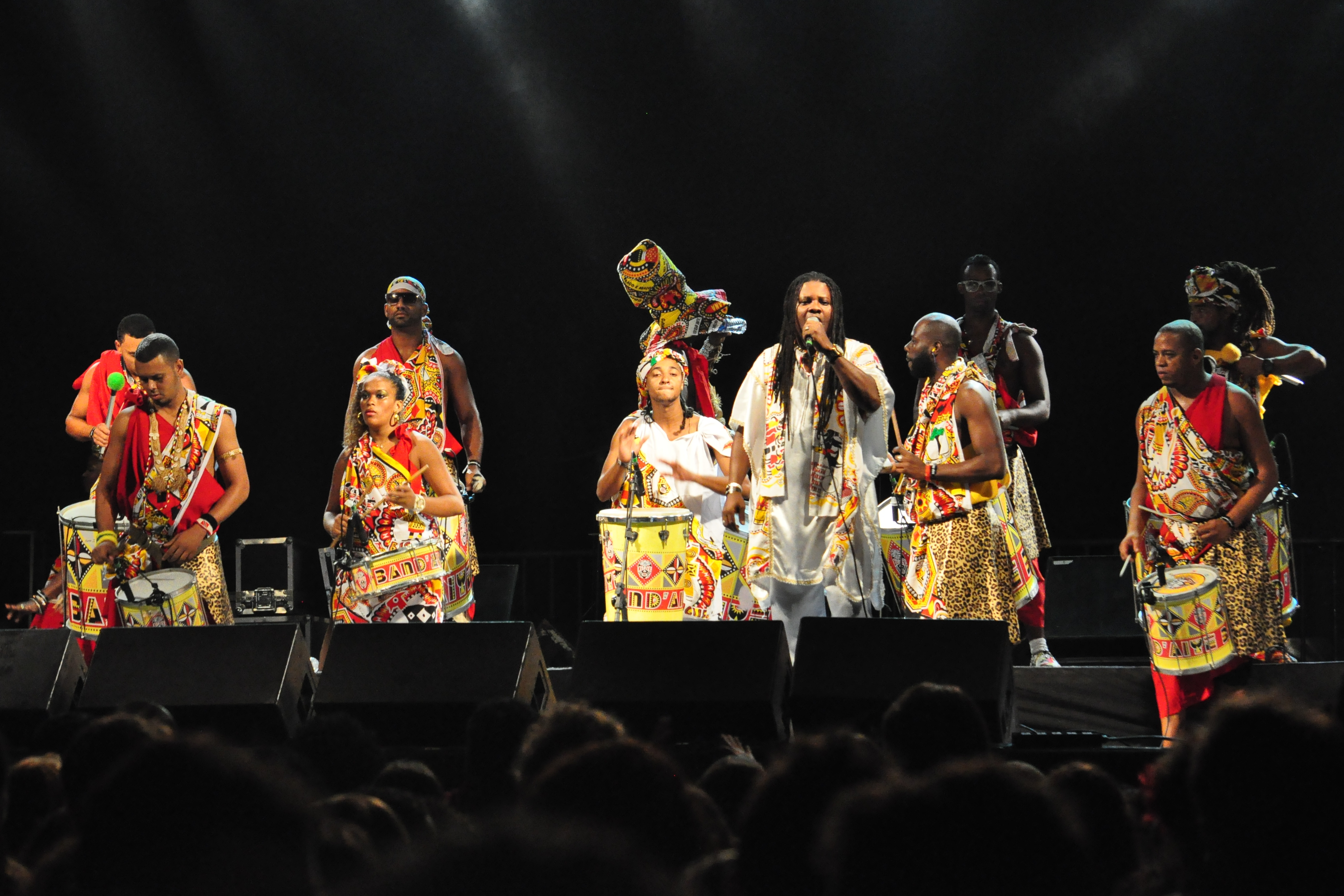
- Ilê Aiyê in Belo Horizonte (2013)
- Nickname(s): O mais belo dos belos (English: The most beautiful of the beautiful)
- Foundation: November 11, 1974; 51 years ago
- Colors
- Location: Curuzu; Liberdade
- President: Antonio Carlos "Vovô" dos Santos
- Patron: Mãe Hilda Jitolu

2019 presentation
- Title: Que bloco é esse? Eu quero saber: 45 anos de Ilê Aiyê (Which block is this? I want to know: 45 years of Ilê Aiyê)
- Motif: Ilê Aiyê's legacy in music and Afro-Brazilian moviment

Website
- ileaiyeoficial.com

Ilê Aiyê is a carnival block from Salvador, Bahia, Brazil. It is located in the Curuzu/Liberdade neighborhood, the largest afro-descendent population area of Salvador. The name stems from the Yoruba language: Ilé - home; Ayé - life, the world or human existence; which can be loosely translated as 'earth'. It was founded in 1974 by Antônio Carlos “Vovô” and Apolônio de Jesus, making it the oldest Afro-Brazilian block.

Ilê Aiyê works to raise the consciousness of the Bahian black community. Persecuted by the police and the media during its first years, and still controversial for only allowing blacks to parade with the group, Ilê Aiyê is a renowned element of Bahia’s carnival. The group pioneered the type of carnival group known as the bloco afro, featuring themes from global black cultures and history, and celebrating the aesthetic beauty of black people. All other Afro-Brazilian blocos borrow elements originally created by Ilê Aiyê, including such groups founded shortly afterwards, such as Olodum and Malê Debalê.

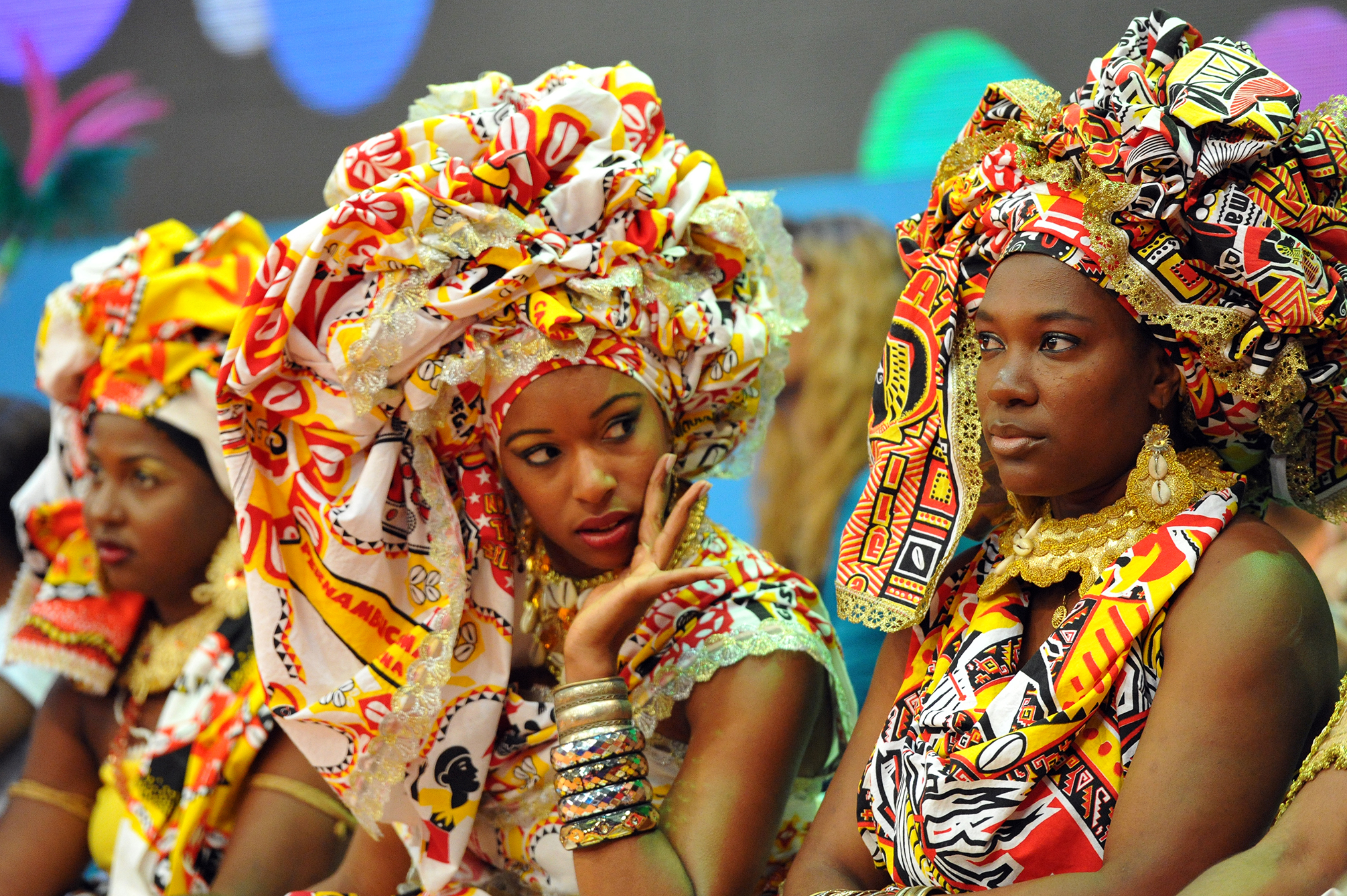
Girls from Ilê Aiyê (2011)

During Bahian carnival, the group includes hundreds of musicians, dozens of dancers, and thousands of members. They traditionally begin their procession on the Saturday night of Carnaval at the home of the Dos Santos family, where for many years Mãe Hilda de Jitolu, the mother of co-founder Vovô, presided as spiritual mother to the group and formal leader of a candomblé. As Ilê Aiyê passes, carnival crowds sing along by the thousands to songs about the importance of African and Afro-Brazilian culture and religion.

Ilê Aiyê was responsible for a huge cultural revolution in Brazil. It is often mentioned that in Salvador, before the founding of Ilê Aiyê, black men and women would never wear colorful dresses, would often not enter through the front door, would not wear afro hairstyles, and black women would not use lipstick – all because of long-standing racist stigmatization. This situation has been thoroughly changed for many Afro-Brazilians thanks to the empowerment processes that Ilê Aiyê implemented through music and through the praise of African culture and history.

== Discography ==
- 1984 - Canto Negro
- 1989 - Canto Negro II
- 1996 - Canto Negro III
- 1998 - Canto Negro IV
- 1999 - 25 Anos
- 2014 - Ilê Aiyê Bonito de se ver
