= Norival Moreira de Oliveira =

Brazilian martial artist

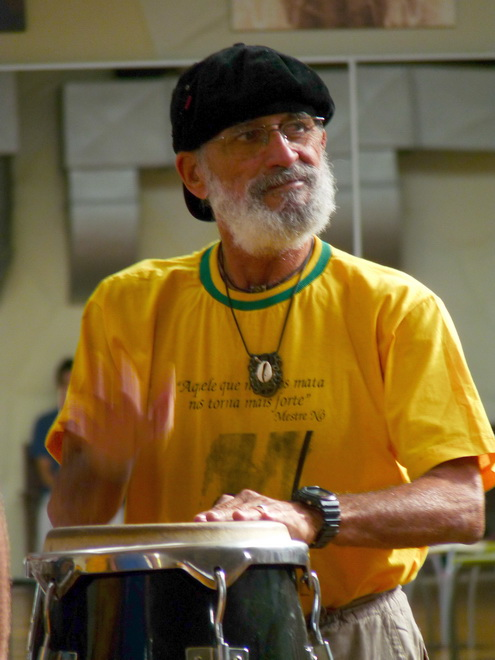
Mestre Nô in Russia, Moscow, 08.2009

Norival Moreira de Oliveira (born June 22, 1945), also known as Mestre Nô, is a Grand Master of capoeira angola who was initiated into capoeira angola at the age of four.

He was born in Coroa, Itaparica, Salvador, Bahia, Brazil. At 7, Norival and his family moved to Massaranduba, a poor neighborhood not far from the church of Bomfim. Mestre Nilton and Mestre Cutica, brothers and highly respected capoeiristas who lived down the block, took young Norival to meet the elder masters Pirró and Zeca. Pirró, Zeca and Nilton organized and commanded many capoeira angola rodas in the streets.

Norival began playing in the mestre's rodas and in 1965 he started teaching in his own academy. Mestre Nô founded Capoeira Academies Retintos, Orixás da Bahia and Capoeira Angola Palmares. He has taught to thousands of capoeiristas. He is founder, president, and grand master of Associacao Brasileira Cultural de Capoeira Palmares (ABCCP), an organization dedicated to teaching, promoting and maintaining the traditions of Capoeira Angola. He is also the president of A.B.C.A. (Associação Brasileira de Capoeira Angola), the most respected association created by the eldest masters to maintain and preserve capoeira angola as it is. Mestre Nô is known throughout the world to be the "mestre dos mestres", the "master of masters", for having graduated over 75 students to the level of Master, which is unique for any one teacher to accomplish in their lifetime.

Today, Mestre Nô lives with his family on Itaparica Island. He travels throughout Brazil, the US, Europe, and other parts of the world helping capoeiristas reach their goals. In August 2009 there will be an international gathering to celebrate the grand opening of CENTRO ACADEMICO DE CAPOEIRA ANGOLA PALMARES in Boca do Rio. He conducts an annual "International Capoeira Angola Palmares Seminar" in Coroa Vera Cruz, Itaparica Island where he conducts classes and imparts the philosophy of traditional Capoeira Angola.
