= Liberdade (neighbourhood) =

Neighborhood in Salvador, Brazil

Liberdade is the second most populous district of Salvador, exceeded only by Cajazeiras. It is a center for Afro-Brazilian cultural institutions such as the Ilê Aiyê carnival block as well as the Carneiro Ribeiro Education Center.

== Geography ==
Liberdade is located on the western side of the city on top of the plateau that divides the lower City ("Cidade Baixa") from the higher city ("Cidade Alta"). It is a short distance away from the port at Água de Meninos, the Feira de São Joaquim market and the ferry terminal, which provides daily service to Itaparica Island. An incline railway, Plano Inclinado Liberdade-Calçada, connects the community with its neighbor Calçada and the rest of the lower city.

== History ==
During the colonial era, a road that joined the backwoods of Bahia to the capital in Salvador. The road would become the main route for which cattle, largely bred in the interior - were marketed and transported to the port of Salvador. When the Brazilians won the war of independence against the Portuguese in Bahia, the victorious troops marched through what is now Liberdade and the old road was renamed 'Liberdade', meaning freedom in Portuguese.

== Culture ==
Liberdade is densely populated with lower income residents and has a strong community life within itself, making it feel like a large city within the wider metropolis of Salvador. The neighborhood has one the highest population of Afro-Brazilian residents in Bahia, and by extension Brazil. Historically, it was often said to be the neighborhood with the most Black people in Brazil, though this title has been given to nearby Pernambués.

It is a bustling neighborhood, where there are always parties, particularly during Carnival. The Cultural Association Ilê Aiyê is based in Liberdade on Rua Direta do Curuzu. Ilê Aiyê is a Carnival block celebrating its African roots that cultivates and performs social work that seeks to improve the self-esteem of black people through music and promotion of African cultures and history.

Close to Liberdade is the Carneiro Ribeiro Education Center, named after the famous Afro-Brazilian linguist and physician. Arguably one of the largest and most pioneering educational initiatives in Brazil, it was founded by educator Anisio Teixeira and inspired the creation of Integrated Public Education Centers (CIEP) and Integrated Child Support Centers (CIAC).

== See also ==
- Ilê Aiyê
- Calçada
- Pernambués
