= Cabeçada =

Headbutt in capoeira

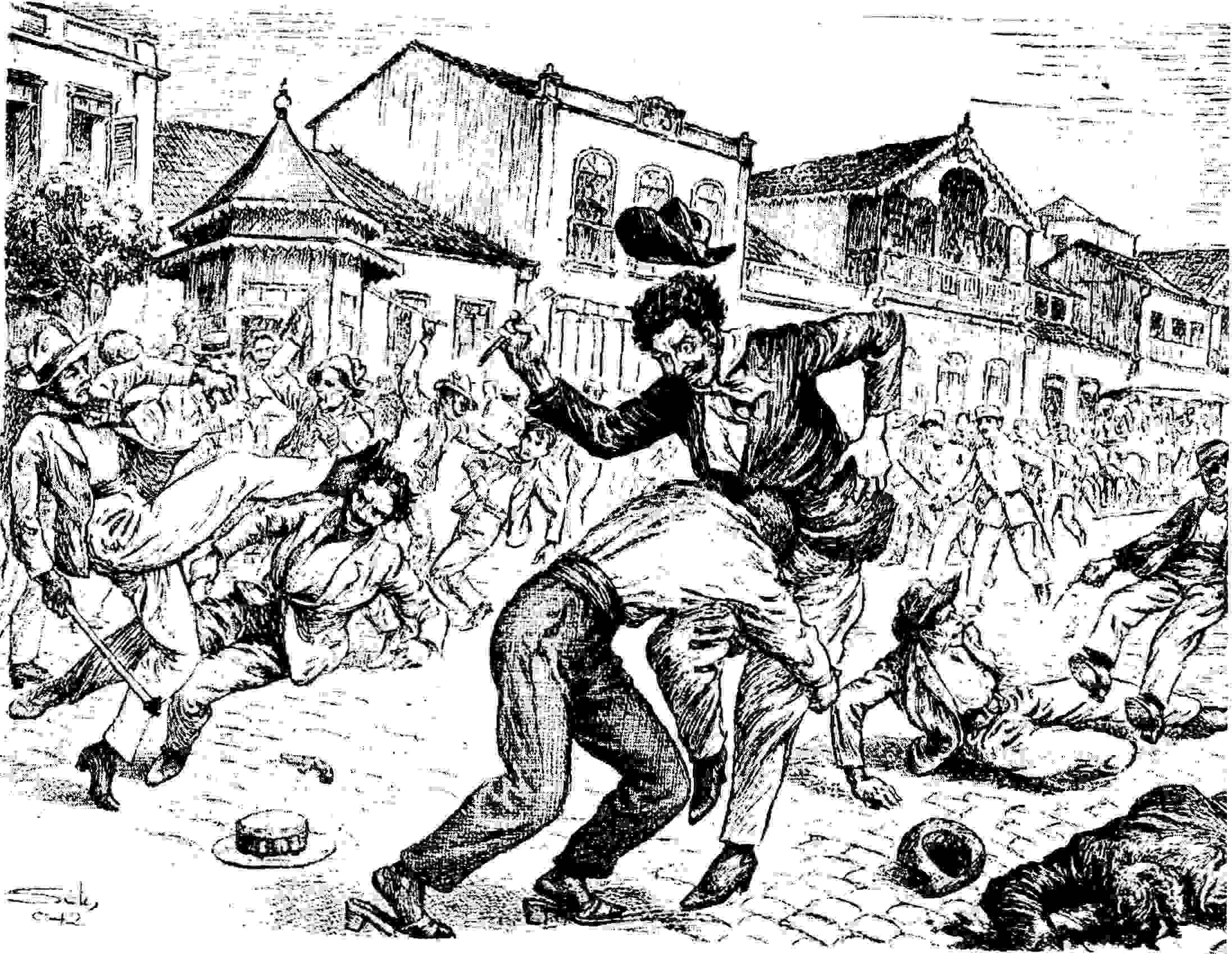
- Headbutt in 19th century Rio capoeiragem.
- Name: Cabeçada
- Meaning: headbutt
- Type: headbutt
- Parent style: capoeira Angola
- Parent technique: jogo de cabeçadas
- Child technique(s): arpão de cabeça escorumelo cocada
- Escapes: esquiva
- Counters: joelhada

Cabeçada (pronounced: ka-be-SA-da, lit. headbutt) is a headbutt in capoeira. It is a commonly used strike and one of the fundamental techniques in traditional capoeira.

Although simple to execute, headbutt is one of the most dangerous moves, often causing fatalities. Headbutt was a deadly technique in 19th century capoeira carioca. In the contemporary capoeira game, violent headbutts are generally avoided.

In capoeira, there are specific head butts, such as arpão de cabeça (head harpoon) and escorumelo.

== History ==
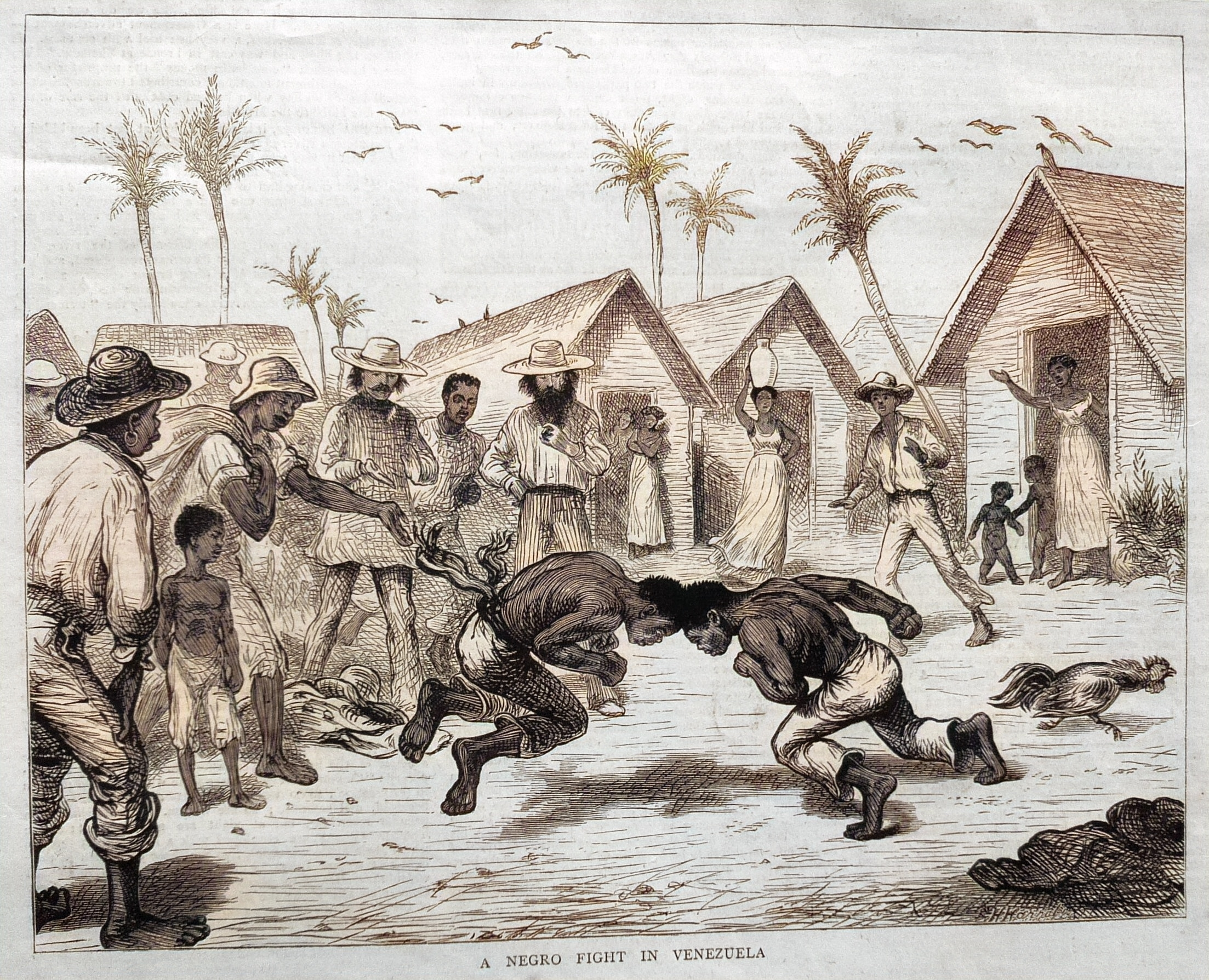
A negro fight in South America, 1874.

The sole major addition to capoeira, aside its engolo kicking core, was headbutting, a common African practice in the Americas, known as jogo de cabeçadas. In the 19th century, headbutts were the capoeiras' primary technique, as per police records. Between 1822 and 1824, the German painter Johann Moritz Rugendas described capoeira as a headbutting game:

Two contestants face each other, each trying to butt his adversary in the chest with his head and knock the opponent down. They turn cartwheels and pause as they launch into an attack. Sometimes they stand like he-goats, butting at each other. The game often turns into a wild brawl when knives are drawn and blood is shed.

— Johann Moritz Rugendas

In capoeira carioca, cabeçada was a deadly technique. An English visitor to Rio de Janeiro wrote in 1826 on this lethal technique:

They need no stiletto, ferro de gaiola, or any other weapon. In lieu of all these, they use only the head; and with it, they butt like bulls at the chest of their victim. I saw a field officer who had been murdered in this manner and thrown over the wall into his garden, where his family found him in the morning: the upper part of the body had been flattened as if the implement of death had been a mallet.

Lethal headbutt techniques were used in the 19th century Bahia also:

On the night of February 22, 1883, the soldier José Raimundo de Souza, standing patrol in the Baixa dos Sapateiros, went to arrest the stevedore Celestino, author of a major conflict on that street, from whom he received a ‘cabeçada’ that caused him almost instant death.

Although headbutts was prominent in street-fighting capoeira due to their effectiveness, it remained relatively infrequent in the game environment. In modern capoeira, headbutts are used more as a defensive tactic to keep a dangerously close opponent at bay rather than as a prominent technique.

== Technique ==
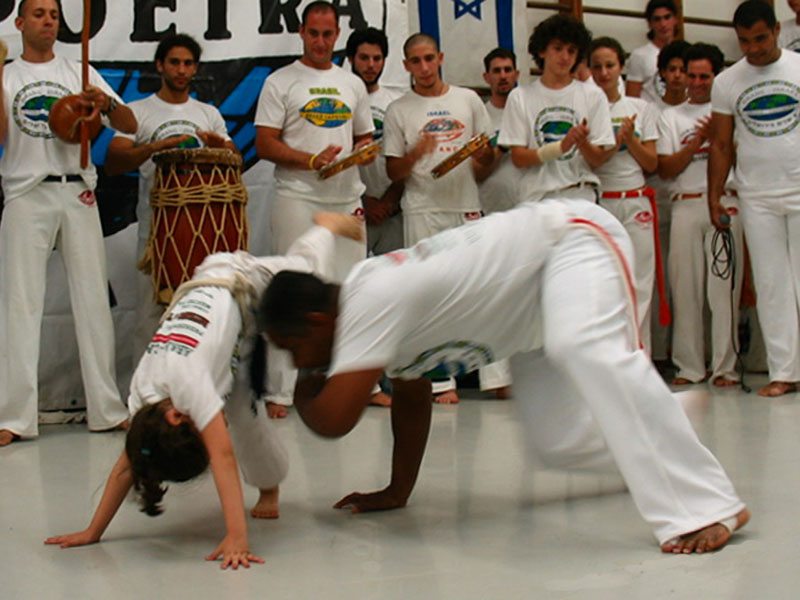
Cabeçada in capoeira game.

To perform a headbutt, the capoeirista lowers their body and launches themselves towards the opponent, striking them with the forehead. The headbutt can be delivered to various regions of the body. The preferred targets are:

- solar plexus, where one firm headbutt can be enough to bring down the opponent.
- chest
- chin or jaw, from bottom up.

As long as there's an opening in the defense, the possibility of a headbutt remains imminent. In this technique, the attacker rapidly approaches, gliding their head along the opponent's chest, usually targeting the chin, nose, or forehead upon contact. It's crucial to emphasize that this technique should never be fully executed in a game situation due to its serious consequences.

According to mestre Pastinha, the headbutt under the jaw, from bottom to top, is very dangerous and can be applied when the opponent is very close. According to mestre Bimba, "its application requires a lot of cunning."

== Application ==
According to mestre Pastinha, cabeçada is a malicious blow that can be applied to the chest or face, with a quick turn of the body when the opponent believes the attacker is withdrawing.

Capoeiristas use a variety of tricks to execute headbutts. For example, in ginga, they may tilt their body to a side as if dodging, but instead prepare for a headbutt if there is enough distance. Capoeirista may also drop objects and then deliver a headbutt when picking them up, especially when facing inexperienced opponent. In addition, if a capoeirista is held by two men, they can free themselves by lowering their body and delivering a headbutt.

== Variations ==
In capoeira carioca, headbutts were so important that they had different names depending on how they were performed. For example, the caveira no espelho, meaning "skull in a mirror," was a standing headbutt to the face, while the cocada was an upward headbutt under the chin.

=== Cocada (coconut) ===
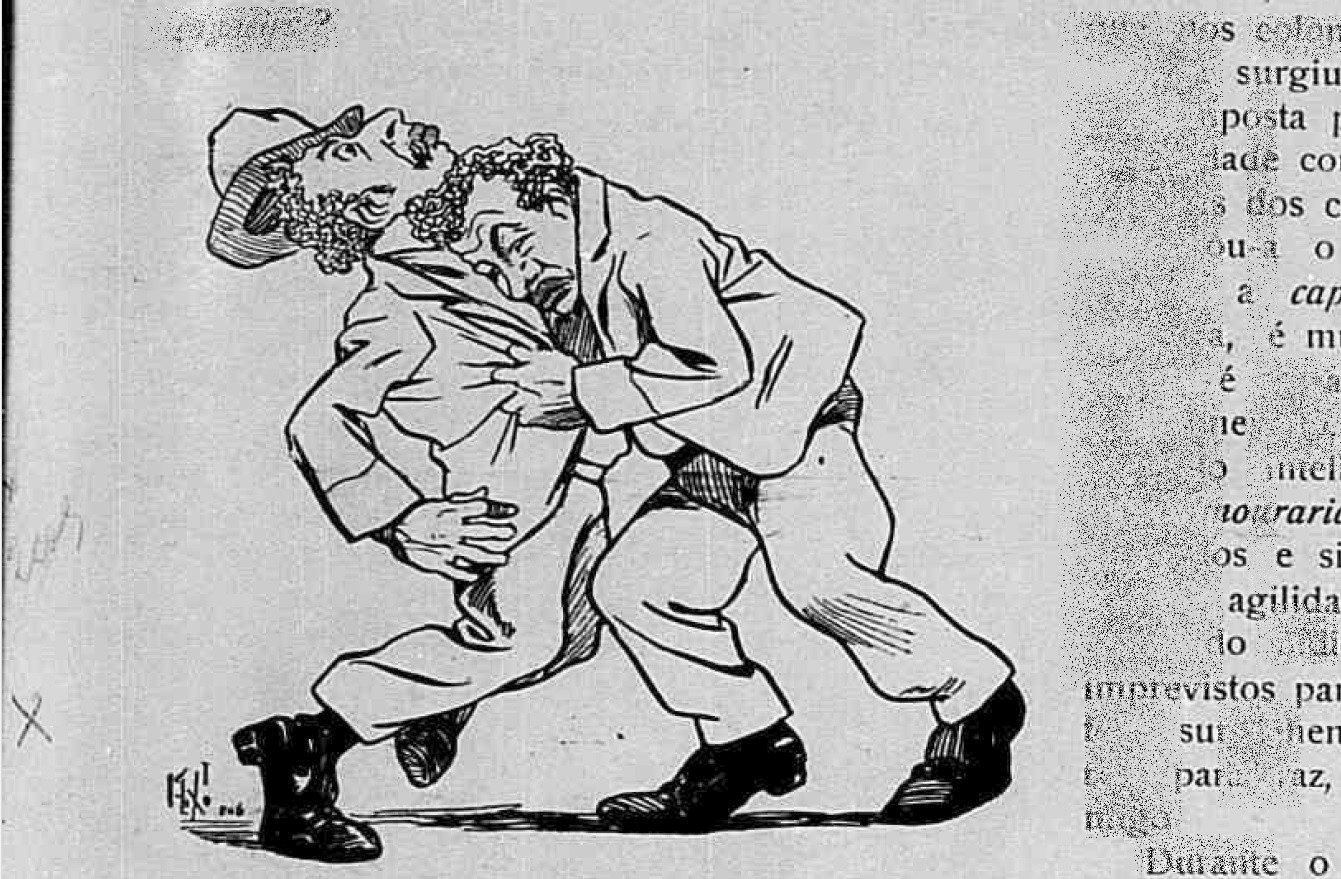
Caricature of capoeira carioca from Rio, using cocada headbutt.

The cocada headbutt is a simple but effective move. To perform it, the attacker approaches the opponent and suddenly lowers themselves, striking the opponent with their head on the underside of the jaw, chest, stomach, or even the face. This move is similar to the rabo de arraia in its consequences, as it can be very disorienting and even terrifying for the recipient when executed correctly.

=== Arpão de cabeça (head harpoon) ===
Arpão de cabeça (head harpoon) is a violent headbutt, where the attacker uses the entire weight of his body. The arms are initially crossed in front of the player's face to shield it from a knee strike. Upon impact, the arms are then opened, enhancing the power of the movement directed towards the adversary's chest or stomach.

== Defenses ==
Possible defense from headbutt is to throw the body backward, and strike the back of the attacker's head with the hand. Or to quickly descends as soon as notice the attacker's intentions, and kick him with the foot from bottom to top.

== See also ==
- Knocking and kicking
- List of capoeira techniques

== Literature ==
- Burlamaqui, Anibal (1928). Gymnástica nacional (capoeiragem), methodisada e regrada. Rio de Janeiro.
- Da Costa, Lamartine Pereira (1961). Capoeiragem, a arte da defesa pessoal brasileira. Rio de Janeiro: Oficial da Marinha.
- Pastinha, Mestre (1988). Capoeira Angola. Fundação Cultural do Estado da Bahia.
- Assunção, Matthias Röhrig (2002). Capoeira: The History of an Afro-Brazilian Martial Art. Routledge. ISBN 978-0-7146-8086-6.
- Capoeira, Nestor (2007). The Little Capoeira Book. Blue Snake Books. ISBN 9781583941980.
- Desch-Obi, M. Thomas J. (2008). Fighting for Honor: The History of African Martial Art Traditions in the Atlantic World. Columbia: University of South Carolina Press. ISBN 978-1-57003-718-4.
- Talmon-Chvaicer, Maya (2008). The Hidden History of Capoeira: A Collision of Cultures in the Brazilian Battle Dance. University of Texas Press. ISBN 978-0-292-71723-7.
