= Cajazeiras (neighbourhood) =

Coordinates: 6.890°S 38.560°W

Cajazeiras is a neighborhood in Salvador, Bahia. It was established by governmental planning with constructions of housing estates in stages that generated sectors (divisions), but its growth became disorderly. From the Municipal Law no. 9,278, dated September 20, 2017, fourteen districts were delimited in the area: Águas Claras, Boca da Mata, Cajazeiras II, Cajazeiras IV, Cajazeiras V, Cajazeiras VI, Cajazeiras VII, Cajazeiras VIII, Cajazeiras X, Cajazeiras XI, Fazenda Grande I, Fazenda Grande II, Fazenda Grande III, Fazenda Grande IV, and even more to Palestina.

It houses intense commerce and the Municipal Hospital of Salvador (located in Via Colectora B, in the neighborhood of Boca da Mata).
