= Akrafena =

Akan swords originating from Ghana

Afena
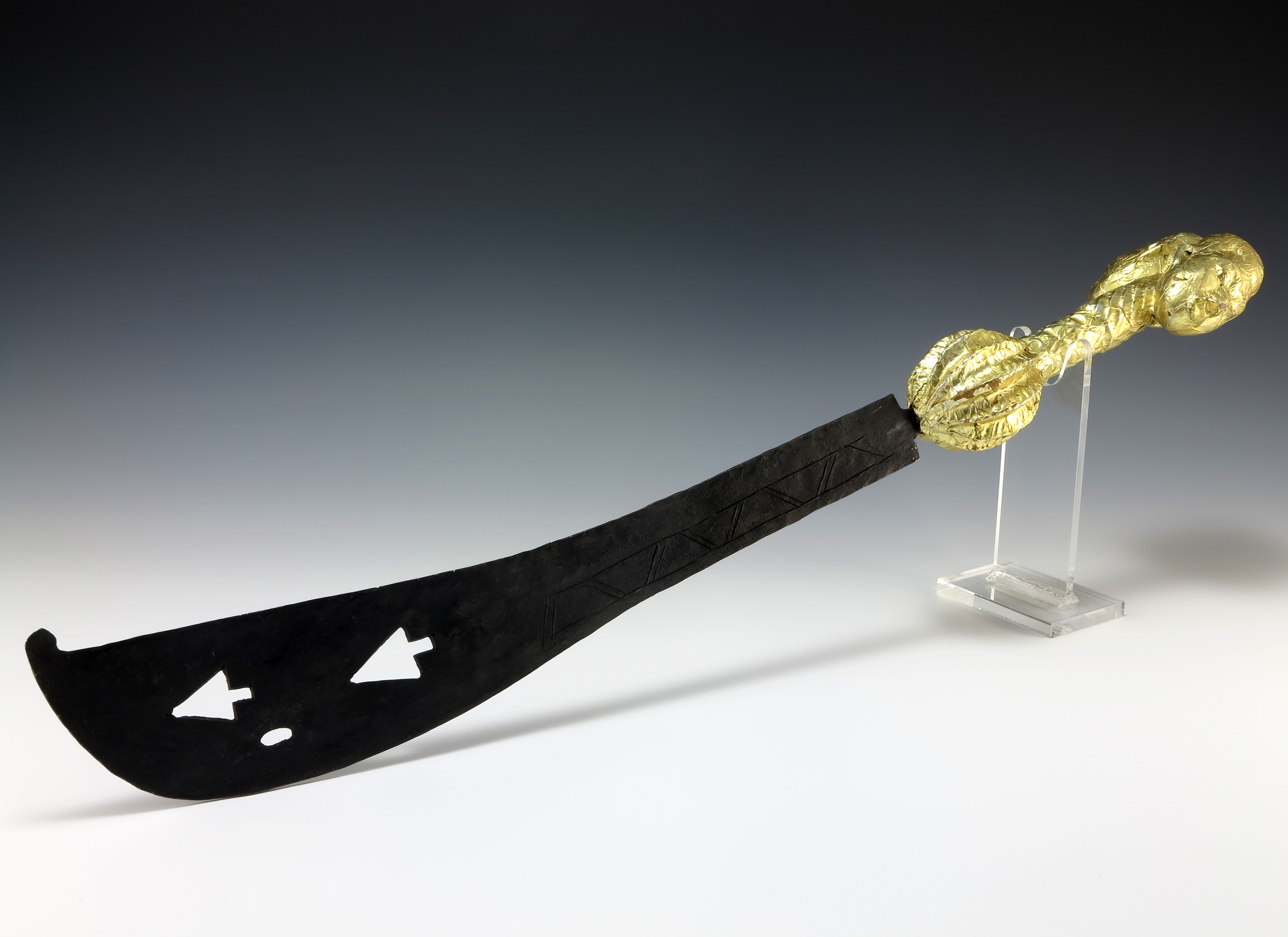
- 20th century afena. Gold-ring pommel. More elaborate Twi swords have adinkra symbols in the ring and on the blade.
- Type: Sword / fighting knife / machete
- Place of origin: Twi

Production history
- Produced: Ashanti City-State (1670–1902) to present

Specifications
- Blade length: Approx. 70–73 centimetres (28–29 in)

An afena (Twi to mean sword) is an Akan sword, originally meant for warfare but also forming part of Akan heraldry. The foremost example of an afena is the Mponponsuo (meaning "responsibility"), which belonged to Opoku Ware II. It has survived to the present day because it is still occasionally used in ceremonies, such as the Akwasidae Festival.

The expert use of afena is also a martial art, utilising the blade in conjunction with knives, improvised weapons, street-fighting, hand-to-hand combat, joint locks, grappling and weapon disarming techniques, as well as using the martial art of afena unarmed. The afena martial art is the national sport of the Ashanti Region.

== Design ==
The sword has three parts: a blade, usually made of some metal such as iron; a hilt of carved wood or metal; and the sheath, usually made of animal hide like leopard, leather and electric eel skin.

The blade in ritual swords may not have a sharp cutting edge. It often has incised lines or Ashanti symbolic designs on it, which evoke specific messages. Some swords have double (afenata) or triple (mfenasa) blades.

The hilt may be wrapped with gold leaf with various Ashanti symbols worked onto it. The hilt itself may be carved to encode an Ashanti symbol.

The sheath may carry an embossment (abosodee) that comprises Ashanti symbols meant to evoke certain expressive messages. The mpomponsuo (responsibility) sword of the Asantehene, for example, has an embossment of a coiled snake with a bird in its mouth. This conveys the Ashanti message: the puff adder that cannot fly has caught the hornbill that flies. This is used to symbolize patience, prudence, and circumspection.

== Types ==
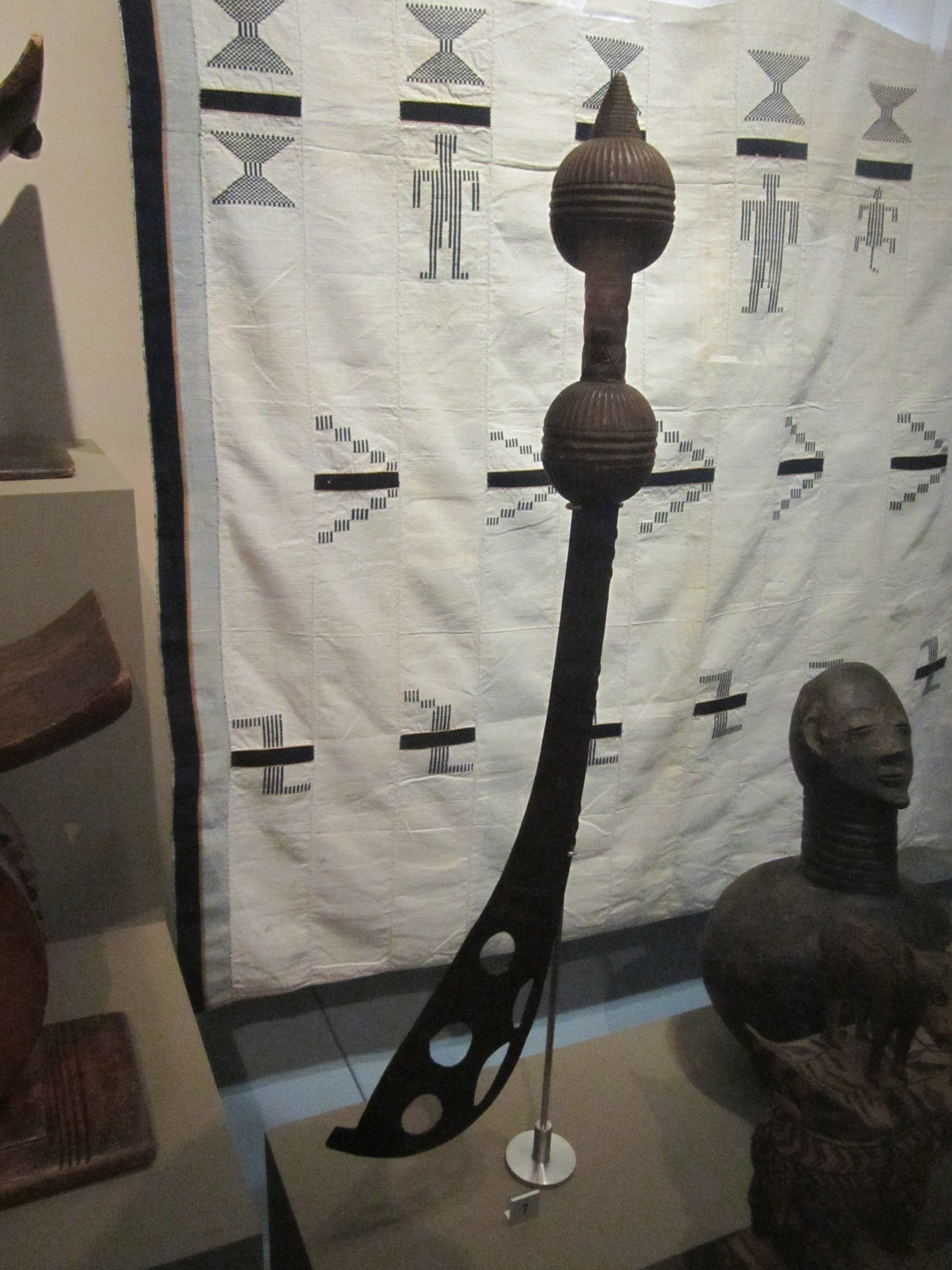
The Fante afena

Traditionally there are about five to six types of Ashanti swords with some better known than others:

Kɛtɛanomfena: Literally meaning swords on the edge of bed. They are placed at the edge of the king's bed when he goes to sleep. Additionally, they are placed on the edges of the apakan (palanquin) when the king rides in it as part of a procession. Kɛtɛanofena are further subdivided into two sets: akrafena (swords of the soul) and abosomfena (deity swords)

- Akrafena: The short sword may be used as akrafena or nsuaefena. The akrafena is used in wars, and in conjunction with an Ashanti stool blackening ceremony; The akrafena may be carried by the king's emissaries on Ashanti diplomatic missions. In such situations, the meaning associated with the Ashanti Adinkra symbol embossed on the sheath conveys the message of the mission. Its name literally means 'Soul Sword' and is held in the right hand due to Akan religion associating the right hand with the soul, representing the person's soul or life-force (kra), unique to the person. It was used in the Asante military for close combat. It did not have a sharp tip, instead having one sharp blade and giving a good amount of weight behind each blow. There is a hierarchy when it comes to akrafena (not Bosomfena) in Asante court:
- Mpomponsuo: The Mpomponsuo sword symbolizes; Responsibility, Power, Loyalty, Bravery, and Authority. The Mpomponsuo sword is used by the Asantehene in taking the oath of office. The other Ashanti amanhene use the Mpomponsuo sword to swear the oath of allegiance to the Asantehene. The Mpomponsuo sword is one of the four principal state swords of Ashanti Region. The Asantehene sword was created by Akomfo Anokye for future Asantehene Nana Opoku Ware I (r. 1731–1742), and is the foremost example of akrafena.
- Ahwebaa: The Ahwebaa sword was made by Akomfo Anokye, which has a caricature of a man holding his belly with his left hand. The Nananom Amanhene including the Mampɔnhene and Dwabenhene swear the oath of allegiance with ahwebaa. Contrary to popular belief, most people wrongly assume that those who swear the great oath with it are more important and powerful than those who swear with ahwebaa. But that is not the case for a chief may use the mpɔnpɔnsɔn to swear but he may not come close, in terms of rank and power, to a chief who (due to history and customs) uses the ahwebaa to swear the great oath of Asanteman. Nkɔnsɔnhene, Hyiawuhene, and Anonomsahene (to name a few) are some of the chiefs who swear the oath of office with ahwebaa.
  - Kra Kofi (Apemase Nhye Da): Asantehene Nana Agyemang Prempeh II (Kwame Kyeretwie) created kra kofi in remembrance of his great uncle, Asantehene Nana Agyeman Kofi, who is known in the annals of Asante history as, Adaduananhene (Forty-days king). He died of mpɛtɛ (Chicken pox) exactly on the fortieth day of his enstoolment. Nana Agyemang Kofi's reign preceded Nana Kwaku Dua II alias Nana Agyemang Prempeh in 1888. Otumfoɔ Agyeman Prempeh II wanted the name and memory of his great uncle enshrined in posterity so he created two swords, the above-named sword and nim saa aka akyi. The proverb for the latter is his expression and understanding that his great uncle did not have the opportunity to execute his vision for Asanteman due to the untimely intervention of death. For the abɔsodeɛ of the former, he chose the Akan saying; Apem ase nhye da as evidence of the continuing growth and bearing of fruit of the plantain tree. For the smallpox might have killed his great uncle, it could not eradicate the royal family and like the plantain tree will never be without smaller shoots. His lineage (the royal family) will endure despite life's manifold challenges that we, as humans, face
  - Kraku
    1. Kraku Panin: Kraku panin was made for Asantehene Kwaku Dua (1834-1867), well known in the annals of Asante history as an exceptional man of peace.
    2. Kraku Kumaa: In 1977, Asantehene Otumfoɔ Opoku Ware II created two swords, kraku kumaa and funtunfunefu dɛnkyɛm funefu. For the former, the abɔsodeɛ is akoma (the heart) and the latter the Siamese crocodile, a well-known adinkra symbol, as abɔsodeɛ. During his reign, the political climate in Ghana was quite challenging for Opoku Ware II and Asanteman as the nation witnessed unprecedented military takeovers from the early 1970s to 1981. In his response to various sections of Asanteman for their king to take action or to step in and stop military takeovers, he responded by saying, mede makoma ato nsuom (I have placed my heart in water). Literally, he is cooling his heart and will not allow his temper to rise. Otumfoɔ Opoku Ware's choice of the Siamese crocodile was in reference to his own uncle who, despite losing his bid to ascend the Gold Stool, was until his [uncle's] death not happy with the selection of Opoku Ware II as Asantehene. So the king said, yɛ nyinaa ya furu baako nanso tɛkrɛma so dɛ nti, na me Wɔfa ɔne me prere akonwa, yɛ de ama me nti no, ɔse ɔnte ne ho ase." Literally, he and his uncle belonged to the same family (abusua) and any benefit will pass through the same stomach but due to 'sweetness of the tongue,' his uncle never forgave the kingmakers for selecting him. Metaphorically, the single stomach of the Siamese crocodile represents the single destiny of the royal family.
  - Abubummabaa: Since ascending Sikadwa Kofi in 2009, Otumfoɔ Osei Tutu II has added four kɛtɛanomfena to the regalia. They are abubummabaa, sakatempobi, esie, and ɛsrɛm sei gyata. Sakatempobi and ɛsrɛm mu sei gyata have corresponding guns that Otumfoɔ created for the same purpose. The mystery of how the abubummabaa created its dwelling has never been resolved and as a frame of reference, Osei Tutu II stated that he is the one who established a union of states that resulted in the formation of Asanteman. This is what he said: "I am Osei Tutu. It was I who founded Asanteman. I have returned and that is why I am like the abubummabaa. Ɛkwan ko a me faa so yɛyɛ, sɛ me kɔ mu, sɛ mankɔ mu, sɛ me wene yɛ, me ara na masan aba. Ɛna me bɛbu ma Asanteman. He has returned to continue his work and like the abubummabaa, we have no idea how he entered his enclave/house. Whether he weaved his abode first before he entered or whether he weaved his house around him, he has come back." Based on his actions since his enstoolment, the Asante generally agree and refer to him as Osei Tutu Ababio (that is, Osei Tutu has come again or returned)
  - Sakatempobi: Sakatempobi are nkranee (big ants in the forest) that in times of bush fires, while the undergrowth is burning, they continue to feed on grasshoppers as they leave the scene of the fire. The proverb in Twi stipulates, egya ɛhye sakatempobi no, na ɔsɔ mmɛbɛ (grasshoppers). In creating this sword, Otumfoɔ Osei Tutu II said, "ɔno wasan aba no, nea ɔbɛka sɛ ɔbɛyɛ biara no, ɔbɛ yɛ. Ɛnyɛ nea obi bɛka na ɛbɛ ma no agyae neɛ ɔpɛsɛ ɔyɛ." He will come back to continue his work and no matter what people might do or say, he will accomplish whatever tasks he has set up for his return
  - Kɔtɔkɔ: This is a special sword made by the Asante Kɔtɔkɔ Society in Kumase to honor Nana Opoku Ware II on his enstoolment as the 15th occupant of the Gold Stool. In honoring the King, the Society remarked that Opoku Ware II was the first Asante king with the highest academic credentials. Opoku Ware II (known in private life as Kwaku Adusei Poku), studied law in the United Kingdom and was called to the Bar at Middle Temple in 1962. In 1970 he was appointed Ghana's Ambassador designate to Italy but he could not fulfill his duty since he was enstooled the same year when his uncle, Otumfoɔ Osei Agyemang Prempeh II, died. Since the days of warfare are over and in order to encourage Opoku Ware II to use the power of the "pen" to accomplish a great deal for Asanteman and Ghana, the Society used the gun and pen as abɔsodeɛ
  - Krakwame (Bɛmuu): Asantehene Agyemang Prempeh II created this sword with the abɔsodeɛ made of a bunch of palm kernels with a heart resting on them. There are two interpretations. The first describes what happens when the bunch of palm kernels is harvested and it falls on the ground, it collects all fallen leaves. The second is that, palm kernels grow on a common stock and in that sense, those of a common stock share the same origin so the king was going to put his heart into uniting the kingdom
- Bosomfena: It was also used in wars by those who were left-handed and had the same usage as the akrafena. However, its name may mean 'God-sword', a call back to the word abosom, and it represents the wielder's spirit, ego and/or personality. This is said to be inherited by the father. Here is the hierarchy of the Bosomfena below:
  - Bosomuru: Bosomuru is one of the regalia Osei Tutu captured from Onoo Adu Gyamfi who until his defeat ruled over a wide territory from present day Kumase to as far as Mampong and had settled in Jamase. Onoo is a town in the Kwaabre district in Asante. Ɔkɔmfo Anɔkye then consecrated the bosomuru for Asanteman and added it to the regalia. The history of the gyemirekutu kyɛ (the hat) is however different from the sword. It is said that on his way from Akwamu to inherit his uncle Obiri Yeboa, Osei Tutu met a hunter who had killed an elephant and ɔwam (hornbill). He asked the hunter for the skin covering the elephant's kneebone, and the feathers of the hornbill. Osei Tutu then placed the head of the hornbill on top of the elephant's skin, and the feathers on both sides of the skin, and added adwera (portulaca oleracea leafs) on his forehead. He finally placed the adam below the adwera and wore the hat to Kumase and eventually added it to the bosomuru when he captured it from Onoo Adu Gyamfi. In that sense, the bosomuru hat is connected with doku agyapɔmaa (the gun with beads around the lever butt (See Atuotumfoɔ/guns). Osei Tutu brought his gun to Kumase after killing the hunter and his wife (Agyapɔmaa), and placed her waist beads around this particular gun. Apart from Otumfoɔ, no one is allowed to swear the oath of office with the bosomuru sword. That explains the saying in Asante: Bosomuru fa wo bem (lit. bosomuru, you've won the case in advance of any proceedings). As a spiritual leader, the Asantehene cannot be found guilty or no one can argue and win a case against him and as a result, and in advance of any proceedings, the elders and chiefs will throw in the towel with the above words. It is only after swearing the Great Oath of Asanteman with the bosomuru sword, as part of the Pampaso rituals, that a newly enstooled king is recognized as Asantehene. The custodian of bosomuru sits to the immediate left of Asantehene whenever the Asantehene sits in state or during state ceremonies. The bosomuru is considered "holy" and, unlike the mpɔnpɔnsɔn, it is cutomarirly not used for war (ɛmpɛ basabasa). Since it is not proper for women to see the bosomuru, the custodian covers it with ɛnwira (white cloth) when women come close to it or during traditional ceremonies when the queen mothers and women take turns to greet Otumfoɔ. Apart from the Asantehene and the custodian, no chief is allowed to touch or hold it. In the likelihood that the custodian needs to relieve himself during ceremonies, he will either rest it by Asantehene's feet or at the feet of the Akɔbeahene. Nana Kwaku Dua II is the current Bomomuruhene.
  - Dɛnkyɛm: Asantehene Osei Kwadwo (1764-1777) created the dɛnkyɛm (crocodile sword) for the custodian to assist bosomuru to efficiently perform its duty. In the absence of the custodian of bosomuru, the bearer of dɛnkyɛm sword is elevated to the spot and performs all the duties ascribed to bosomuru. Ntotoyɛhene and Nsutahene are two chiefs who have links with this sword. Prior to being elevated to the position of Nsutahene by Otumfoɔ, the former was responsible for the abusuapoma (family staff) and that can be translated into the chief spokesperson. Then the royal spokesperson's staff was given to the Ntotoyɛhene who was then the Dɛnkyɛmenasohene. To this day, the ntuakyire on top of Ntotoyɛhene's umbrella is the crocodile. The staff finally was transferred to the chief of Jachie popularly known as Jachie Amoateng where it has remained since and that is why the chief of Jachie is one of the senior royal spokesperson's of the Asantehene. Additionally, the dɛnkyɛm sword either leads or is part of a delegation whenever a message is sent to the present Nsutahene (also considered the uncle of the Asantehene).
  - Bosompra
    1. Bosompra Panin: Asantehene Kwaku Dua (1824-1834) created bosompra panin sword primarily for the royal family and since the Asantehemaa (the Asante queenmother) is head of the royal family, it represents her during purification rituals for the royal family. The bosompra sword is restricted to communications between the king and the Asantehemaa's household and do not, as custom demands, go to any chief's house. During gatherings (festivals, durbars, funerary rites or any state function), it is customary for the Asantehene's precession to be in place with the king well sitted before the bosompra Paninhene is sent to the queen mother to inform her that the king is ready for his mother (biological or symbolical) to join him. For the queen mother, the presence of bosompra panin in her court is an indication that the king and elders are waiting for her since she will never join the ceremony without this special invitation with the bosompra panin sword. After greeting her son, the queen then takes her rightful place to the left of the king. The queen mother will never join the king in any ceremony or gathering unless bosompra panin sword is sent for her. This sword used to be known as bosompra until Asantehene Agyemang Prempeh (1888-1931) created another one in the same category and in order to distinguish the first from the second sword, they added the designation "panin" (older) to it (see Bosompra Kuma below). In deep Twi, bosompra refers to a benefactor who is highly dependable for providing sustenance. In other words, bosompra is a metaphor and an indication that the king is responsible for providing for the spiritual and material needs of the royal family and the larger community in all kinds of ways. Bosompra panin sits to the left of Asantehene. Kra adwareɛ refers to soul purification rites for a sitting king. This ritual is performed once a week on the day the king was born. Before a newly enstooled king creates his swords with abɔsodeɛ, bosompra panin is used to represent him during purification rites for his soul until he creates his own sword or swords.
    2. Bosompra Kumaa: Otumfoɔ (later Asantehene) Agyeman Prempeh (1888-1931) created bosompra kuma sword upon his return from exile in Seychelles in 1924. In order to save Asanteman from total annihilation by the British forces in 1896 he gave himself up and the British took the queen mother, Nana Yaa Akyaa, some of his chiefs, and elders to far away Seychelles in the Indian Ocean. With a hen and her chicken as abɔsodeɛ, Nana Agyemang Prempeh is indicating that as the Asantehene, he is protective of his children just as the hen protects her chicks. He gave this sword to his abusua (the royal family/clan/tribe) and since bosompra panin was already assigned to his abusua, they named this sword "kuma," (the younger). Strictly speaking, and unlike bosompra panin, this sword is not used in purification rites for the soul. In rare cases, it replaces bosompra panin when the custodian is not available. However the Asantehene can send the custodian on several errands related to the royal family.
  - Bosomurutwe: On January 31, 1935, Asantehene Agyeman Prempeh II (Kwame Kyeretwie) finally succeeded in restoring Asanteman (or Asante State) and in commemoration of this historical feat, created Bosomurutwe (Maxwell Duiker). In doing so, he declared: Ɔtwe, me twe me man. Me man na me twe. That is, Ɔtwe, I am pulling (twe in Twi) my nation [back] together. In this particular instance, the phonology of the word twe (pull) in Twi is the determining factor in choosing the abosodeɛ. The action of pulling is evident on top of the accompanying hat with the two hands pulling two palm trees and bringing them together. The action of pulling is also indicative of how daunting it was to bring former states of the union together considering that most of them were enjoying their newlyfound independence after severing their ties with the Asante Kingdom. It should be recalled that Asanthene Agyemang Prempeh initiated the restoration of Asanteman when the British eventually returned him from Seychelles in 1924. One of the conditions for his return was for him to limit his reign to being Kumasehene (not Asantehene). Although Asanteman agreed to that stipulation, what the British did not understand is that Kumasehene is technically the Asantehene. At any rate, Nana Agyeman Prempeh worked tirelessly and was determined to restore the kingdom but he died in 1931 before he could accomplish his goal. On assumption of office in 1931, Agyemang Prempeh II embarked on this difficult task and eventually succeeded in restoring the Asante State in 1935.
  - Esie: Asantehene Nana Poku Ware II created esie. Since his day name was Kwaku (Wednesday), which happens to be the same for Otumfoɔ Osei Tutu II, esie is central in the soul purification rituals for the present king on Wednesdays. The abɔsodeɛ is esie (a mound) and as the Akan proverb goes, esie nanimuonyam ne mmire (lit. the value of a mound is based on the quality of mushrooms it produces/that grow on it). Therefore, Asanteman's value is Otumfoɔ for compared to all the ten regions in Ghana, Asante is the only region with a single king. Consequently, esie refers to Asanteman while emire (mushrooms) refers to Otumfoɔ Osei Tutu II
  - Ɛsrɛm Sei Gyata: Created by Otumfoɔ Osei Tutu II with a corresponding gun. As a predator the fierce attributes of the lion is well documented. Unlike the leopard that lives in dense forest regions and is capable of climbing trees, the lion, on the contrary, lives in savannah grassland areas. The appellation ɛsrɛm sei gyata literary means osei from the savanna grasslands that is brave and fierce like the lion. No one (including his enemies) can overrun the Asantehene just as no animal is capable of doing the same to the lion
  - Gyapetia: Although gyapetia is one of the oldest kɛtɛanomfena, the custodian of the sword does not possess a hat, akrafokonmu and abɔsodeɛ. Gyapetia is the main sword that Asante Adikrofoɔ (head of towns) use when swearing the great oath ahead of their chief who is unturn going to swear the great oath to the Asantehene. Kɔmfo Anɔkye also made a pronouncement that since the Amanhene were using the ahwebaa to swear the great oath, their elders who preceded them should use the gyapetia sword. Swearing the oath with gyapetia spiritually ensures loyalty and compliance on the part of the elders making the agreement with Asanteman binding. In order to insure a tight alliance, he made conquered chiefs and those who willingly joined Kumase to swear the oath of allegiance with the gyapetia sword that Kɔmfo Anokye created. According to Kɔmfo Anɔkye, no matter how powerful a chief might be, they are entirely subdued once they swear with gyapetia. When the Asantehene Osei Bonsu brought items from the ocean to Kumase on his return from the Asante-Fante war, he introduced the ɛtwom (apurukusu / electric fish) skin for the scabbard for this sword
- Nsuaefena: The Nsuaefena is used in the Ashanti political ceremony of taking the oath of office by the king and in swearing oath of allegiance by the subjects to the Ashanti emperor-king Asantehene.
- Asomfomfena: A set of courier swords including, gyegyetire, worosatire, nsonoma, abɔnnua, akyekyedeɛ, akuma, oburumuankoma and a set of mfenatene. The swords in this group without abɔsodeɛ are known as mfenatene. Just as the kɛtɛanomfena are considered the Asante king's personal swords, asomfemfena, strictly speaking, belongs to the Gold Stool (Sikadwa Mfena), so are the swords of the Golden Stool
  - .Gyegyetire: Asomfohene (chief of courier swords) is the custodian of this sword and at the same time Kɔkɔɔbrahene (chief of Kɔkɔɔbra). Ɔkɔmfo Anɔkye created gyegyetire specifically for Asomfohene's family in recognition of the sacrifice his great-great-grandmother and the first wife of Osei Tutu I, Nana Kyera Ampɔnsɛm, gave to Asanteman. Following that incident, Anɔkye created gyegyetire sword for her family and established that they would use it primarily for errands as described in the opening paragraph. When the Asantehene sends the Akyeamehene (chief royal spokesperson) with messages to the government he is accompanied by the Asomfohene and Nsɛneɛhene on that mission.
  - Worosati: Literally means Worasa's head. The abɔsodeɛ is a gold cast of the once powerful King of Banda who terrorized Asante traders traveling through his territory to Gyaaman and Bonduku. Sometimes the traders were robbed of their goods and money and on other occasions they were robbed and killed. When Asantehene Osei Kwadwo (Ɔko Awia-1764-1777) sent the asomfo and nsɛneɛ, Worosa mutilated them and that resulted in another Asante-Banda war (Bana Sa). The Asante defeated Worosa, beheaded him, brought his head to Kumase, where the artisans made a replica of his head.
  - Nsoroma: With the assistance of his spiritual advisor, Kɔmfo Anɔkye, Ɔpemsoɔ Osei Tutu created this sword for the Asomfofoɔ. The abɔsodeɛ has several stars on top of the moon (nsoroma bebree na ɔsrane ɔda mu fua). The Akan saying is: Ɔbɔɔ nyanko nsoroma bebree; sranee na (ɔ)man wɔ no (lit. just as there is a single moon among countless number of stars, there are several chiefs. But there is only a single king–the Asantehene. The nsoroma afena with its corresponding nsɛneɛ are responsible for sending messages to the Amantoɔnum (five states) in Asante: Dwaben, Nsuta, Mampong, Kokofu, and Bekwai.
  - Abobɔnnua: Abubonnua is the sword that goes to Adanse with messages. The abɔsodeɛ is made of elephant teeth and covered with gold. As an area, Adanse towns are quite unique in a way. They are likened to woodpeckers who live individually in the holes they drill in trees. Adanse is referred to as Adanse Nkɔtoankɔtoa. After elevating the Adansehene to Ɔmanhene status (paramount chief), Otumfoɔ Opoku Ware II asked the remaining towns to form a council with Adansehene as the head. Despite this arrangement, the individual towns in Adanse retain their separate fekuw (groups) whenever they are in Kumase or Manhyia.
- Afenatene: is used by Akans to penetrate the Akan war opponents hearts. The Blade of an Afenatene sword shows the akoma (heart), denkyem (crocodile), akuma (axe) and the sankofa. The Afenatene was significantly less common than the akrafena amongst the Asante, being mainly used by the Denkyrians. They were long pointed swords, comparable to cutlasses, that were used to both stab and slash. Outside war, it had little usage, but were used in rituals. The Afenatene usually does not have a sheath, or abɔsodeɛ. It is, however, topped by an Ashanti Adinkra symbol if used for rituals
  - Ritual Afentene: Also known as a staff sword, it had an incredibly long, skinny shaft that protrude from the handle, and bulges out at the end, comparable to a really long and narrow akrafena, or maybe a naginata or a really long axe or sword. They were too awkward and clumsy to be used in actual combat
  - Gyapetia: Gyapetia is one of the Asomfomfena (courier swords) without abɔsodeɛ and as a result, it is identified as afenatene. It was Asantehene Kusi Boadum (1750-1764) who created this sword at a time when he created the position of sɔmesisi (lit. hold my waist) for ahenemma ne ahene nananom (the children and grandchildren of Asantehene).
- Afenanta: The Afenanta is a "Double Blade Sword" used by the Ashantis for cutting human ligaments during an Ashanti war. The Afenanta has the Ashanti denkyem and sankofa symbols embroidered onto the blades. It is similar in size to the akrafena but is lighter, has less of a curve and has a skinnier blade. It was used as a dual wielding weapon to cut and slash and better suited to being dual wielded as it was much lighter than the akrafena, which were quite heavy specifically at the end. The Afenanta's light, evenly-spread weight made it more practical to dual wield.
- Abrafoɔ swords: Unlike kɛtɛanomfena, abrafoɔ swords do not have abɔsodeɛ and as a result, they hold the hilt while the sword blades are not in sheaths but exposed. The swords of Abrafoɔ are black due to contact with human blood in the past several centuries. The hierarchy of abrafoɔ swords are as follows:
  - Kontonkronwi: Refers to the hair around the neck. An Akan saying is that death is like the hair around the human neck, we all have it. That is, we shall all succumb to death one day. It is said that the Nkram Abrafoɔ group came to Kumase from Adanse Nyaadoam which was part of Denkyira at the time. Asantehene Opoku Ware created the Nkram Abrafoɔ stool together with the kontonkronwi sword when they were formally presented to him for the leader of the Nkram Abrafoɔ group. The king realized that they were brave and fearless men who would not waver or fumble if asked to execute criminals. The primary duty with the sword was to guide Opoku Ware's wife who lived at the time in Abrepokese. Additional duties included the regular som (service) during the day in the king's palace where he was assigned the role of taking criminals to Nkram. He sits to the left when the Asantehene sits in state while he together with the other three Abrofoɔ chiefs walk ahead of the kɛtɛanomfena in a procession. Similarly, he places his sword on the left hand side of Asantehene when he is carried in a palanquin and it is his sword, kontonkronwi, that absorbs and deflects bad spirits from and away from the Asantehene. The Kontonkronwi has 4 sɛpɔ knives, which are as below:
    1. Kumamani: literally means 'Killer of known persons/townsmen'
    2. Kumahɔhoɔ: Killer of visitors
    3. Kumadehyeɛ: Killer of royals
    4. Sɛpɔ: Knife
  - Gye Me Di: Literally means trust me. Nana Brafonyam was part of the retinue of executioners, warriors and mercenaries who guarded Ɔpemsoɔ Osei Tutu I from Akwamu to Kumase. Kɔmfo Anɔkye later created a special sword for Nana Brafonyam to guard the Gold Stool, called Gye Me Di. Anoo covers present-day prisons, the Highcourt, the soldier line to Kɔmfo Anɔkye Hospital roundabout. Later King Opoku Ware relocated the Anoo Abrafoɔ to Ahodwo Mmaakro for them to protect his wife. Mmaa describes the sticks the Anoo Abrafoɔ used to whip trespassers who, for some reason, were caught hanging around the area where the king's wife lived.
  - Kantankrakyi: The sword of the chief of tɔprɛ
  - Anadwo sekan: The night sword

== Afena as weapons ==
=== History ===
==== Bonoman Kingdom (10th century AD) and the Ashanti Empire States (13th century AD to 21st century) ====
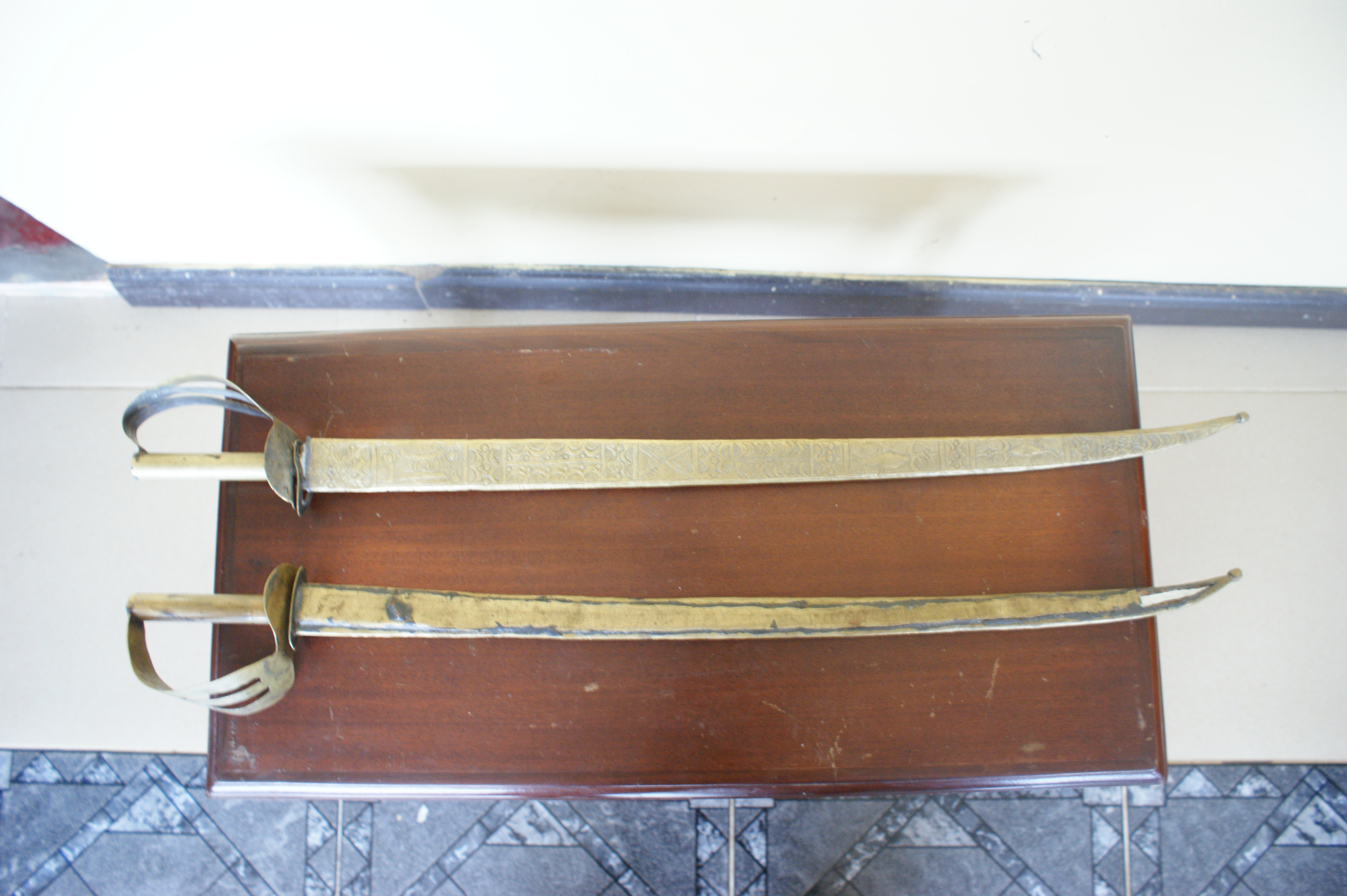
A Denkyira akrafena

Bonoman long swords were used primarily by Ashanti cavalry and commanders not infantry during the 10th to 15th centuries, which explains how akrafena has and still is linked to nobility. In the 16th century and at the time of Denkyira, Akyem and Akwamu land warfare consisted mostly of spearmen and bowmen on foot and mounted swordsmen with Akan long swords (Afenatene). Ashanti Swords were not a primary weapon for all Ashanti combat but were mostly for Ashanti shock attacks, defensive strokes and close combat. Blades were heavy as they were made of bronze and later iron, and pommels were often knobbed and used as balances. Short swords may have been used in follow-up attacks, as short sword carriers were armoured completely and accompanied with a shield.

Ashanti akrafena with wooden or metal pommels decorated with beaten gold have featured in Ashanti court regalia since the 17th century AD. Ashanti Swords were used during Ashanti wars since the 17th century. The Ashantis were engaged in a series of military conflicts from the 18th century AD, between Ashanti City-State military forces and African states and European states up until the 20th century.

In the 21st century, the Ashanti Swords are primarily by Ashantis for self-defense, and the Ashanti akrafena (Ashanti Sword of war) is primarily used for Ashanti warfare and land warfare.

During the Empire of Ashanti period, Ashanti swords also had ranks (hierarchy) depending on who wielded them and what their purpose was. The highest ranking of these swords was known as the Mpomponsuo, literally meaning "responsibility sword." Only two such swords existed and were wielded by the King's two bodyguards, who always stood on either side of him and held the nobility title of Ankobia.

==== Ashanti swords of war (twenty-first century): changing needs and tactics ====
The Ashanti akrafena (sword of my soul) was generally held in the hand by Ashanti asafos. There was no real reason to hold it on their sides. However, they did strap it to their back at times when they were traveling through the rain-forest regions of Ashanti City-State or using other weapons such as spears and bows. The Ashanti sword was first and foremost one-handed, though for more powerful strikes, two hands were used. The Ashanti techniques were generally hand and a half.

== Swordsmen ranks ==
Asafo who are swordsmen in Akanland and in the Asantehene's court progress through four tiers of rank, at times referred to as levels, of their swordsmanship. There are:

- Afenasoafoo: Afenasoafoo is a child, an Akofo-in-training. They are sword-bearers in the Akan court
- Adumfoo: Adumfoo is an apprentice. They are Executioners in the Akan court
- Akofo Asafo: Akanland's Warriors / Professional Soldiers. They are master swordsmen in the Akan court and military. They could form groups of warriors, mercanaries and/or soldiers
- Akofo Abrafoo: They are the Military Police of the Akan. Abrafoo is interchangeably referred to as "Akofo", also master swordsman, but are of a higher rank than the Akofo Asafo. One Abrafoo group, and possibly all abrafoo groups, have Abrani, Atano God of Executioners, as their patron deity. It is usually their job to protect the wives of the Asantehene.
- Akofo Ankobia: The highest rank an Akan swordsman can achieve. They are the Akanland's special forces. The Ankobia is the oldest, most experienced and best trained of all Akofo. They served as special forces and bodyguards to the Asantehene. They served as a source of intelligence for suppressing rebellion. An Ankobia is chosen by the Akofo (Swordsmen) council

== Other swordmen/guard ranks ==
- Animosumfoɔ: Animosumfoɔ normally go to Manhyia Palace at night (or at sundown) and leave at dawn (or at sunrise) for it is their duty to guard the palace at night. They are never part of rituals or ceremonies that take place in the day. The designation, animosum, refers to the fact that this group essentially operated in darkness. In current idiom, we might say they are commandos or special forces, or assassins were operated as guards. Unlike the Tɔprɛfoɔ who will only execute condemned criminals or war captives, Animosumfoɔ may kill any random person they encounter in their nightly duties to protect Manhyia Palace. Unlike the Tɔprɛfoɔ or other Abrafoɔ, they do not use the sword or a sharp-edged knife to kill, rather, they kill with bare hands by breaking the neck of their victim, showing their proficiency in hand-to-hand combat. In the past, they used mpre to whip people aside to clear the way for the Asantehene. It is said that Asantehene Osei Kwame (1777-1798) married the present Animosumhene's great-great-grandmother, Nana Bema (Ɔheneyere Bema), and they bore two sons, Afriyie Kwame and Owusu Ansa. They were well built, tall and strong. The king made one of them the Safohene and created the animosum stool for Nana Bema's family so that they would be in charge of his anadwo sekan (night sword). In the past, a regular sitting or atenaseɛ (a gathering) of chiefs lasted late into the night. On those occasions, Anadwo Sekanfoɔ would show up and when the sitting was over, it was their duty to clear the way or guard Otumfoɔ safely back to his residence and guard the palace throughout the night. The Animosum Abrafoɔ are under the Atipihene and part of the Ankobea Division headed by Baafoɔ Kwame Kusi II. They have abɛntia (short trumpet) that repeatedly play: anopasuo mmoro baakofoɔ (the morning rain does not soak one person). Knives and swords were not part of their regalia, which is due to them using Akofena (see Akrafena as a martial art) without weapons. Only the most skilled and deadly at Akofena could join the Animosumfoɔ. Due their roles, it is safe to say that they were linked to the Ankobia and Abrafoo
- Tɔprɛfoɔ (Executioners): Although they are primarily executioners, tɔprɛ also refers to a drum, the aworobɛn (trumpet/horn), the music they perform, and the dance associated with this particular drum. The custodians brought it from Adanse Akrokyerɛ when they realized Nana Ntim Gyakari and Denkyiraman were on the verge of losing the war to Ɔpemsoɔ Osei Tutu and Asanteman. Because they belong to the Asona clan, they first went to Nana Oti Awere, Akwamuhene at that time, who later took them to formally introduce them to Ɔpemsoɔ Osei Tutu. Osei Tutu then asked the Atwemahene at the time, Nana Agyeibi, to give them a place. The king later created a stool and a chief for them and gave them the kantankrakyi sword and ordered them to use it as part of the regalia that protects Sikadwa Kofi. The story is told of Nana Gyamanin Awere who came upon the atoprɛ drum in the forest on one of his hunting expeditions. The drum was placed on an asipim chair so he believed it belonged to mmoatia (dwarfs). He fired his gun three times and when no one showed up, he picked up the drum and took it home. Since they did not know the name of the drum, who owned it, or what it was used for, Gyamanin Awere consulted the family's deity, Ɔworɔ. Ɔworɔ's priest told them that the name of the drum is tɔprɛ, it belonged to a king and that they should return it to him. The priest went on to say that Nana Gyamanin Awere's family would perish if they decided to keep the drum. They were further instructed never to place the drum on the ground and that it should always be placed on an asipim chair. The only time the drum is played is on Akwasidae Dwoɔda (the Monday after Akwasidae when they are in the process of executing a criminal). As the Akan saying goes, Atoprɛ to a etwa Dwoɔda (Atɔprɛ takes place on Monday). The Kokorahene is responsible for tying the individual with the kokora rope (with thorns) while they play the atoprɛ drum behind the convict and walk through all abrɔno aduosonson (the seventy-seven suburbs) in Kumase. In those days, abrɔno were equivalent to households and they were all located in present-day Adum

== Executions ==
For the Atoprɛfoɔ, execution was in the form of bodily mutilations and gradual bleeding of the convict until he passed out due to the loss of blood. When the convict was paraded in the streets, they would, for instance, ask him, “have you seen the skin on your back before?” Then they would cut the skin on his back and show it to him. “Have you seen your ear before?” They would cut his ear and show it to him. While they were parading the condemned person in the streets, one of the atɔpre chief's nephews would be dancing in front of the condemned man. He is the only one who is allowed to dance and individuals who were tempted to dance faced harsh penalties of fines or death. One of the most famous of his nephews was Anin Agyei and that gave rise to the saying: Anin Agyei a odi atɔfoɔ kan (Anin Agyei who leads the condemned). This would continue until they returned to the palace where the Asantehene would confirm and congratulate them for performing atoprɛ. Because the chief's hand would be covered with human blood, he would not shake Otumfoɔ's hand. This tradition continues to today even though they no longer perform atoprɛ nor perform executions. The condemned person was not allowed be killed nor should he pass away until he is presented in his mutilated and bleeding state to Otumfoɔ. The Atoprɛhene would face serious consequences should a condemned person die before they returned to the palace. Function: They are always available to protect Abenwa (the Gold Stool) and in the absence of Abenwa, they protect Otumfoɔ's akonwa (chair) during akwasidae ceremonies or dwabɔ.

== Afena as an Ashanti national symbol ==
The akrafena also an Ashanti national symbol, adopted by Ashanti City-State's emperor-king Asantehene Opoku Ware I in 1723. In this context it is known as Akofena.

=== Heraldic description ===
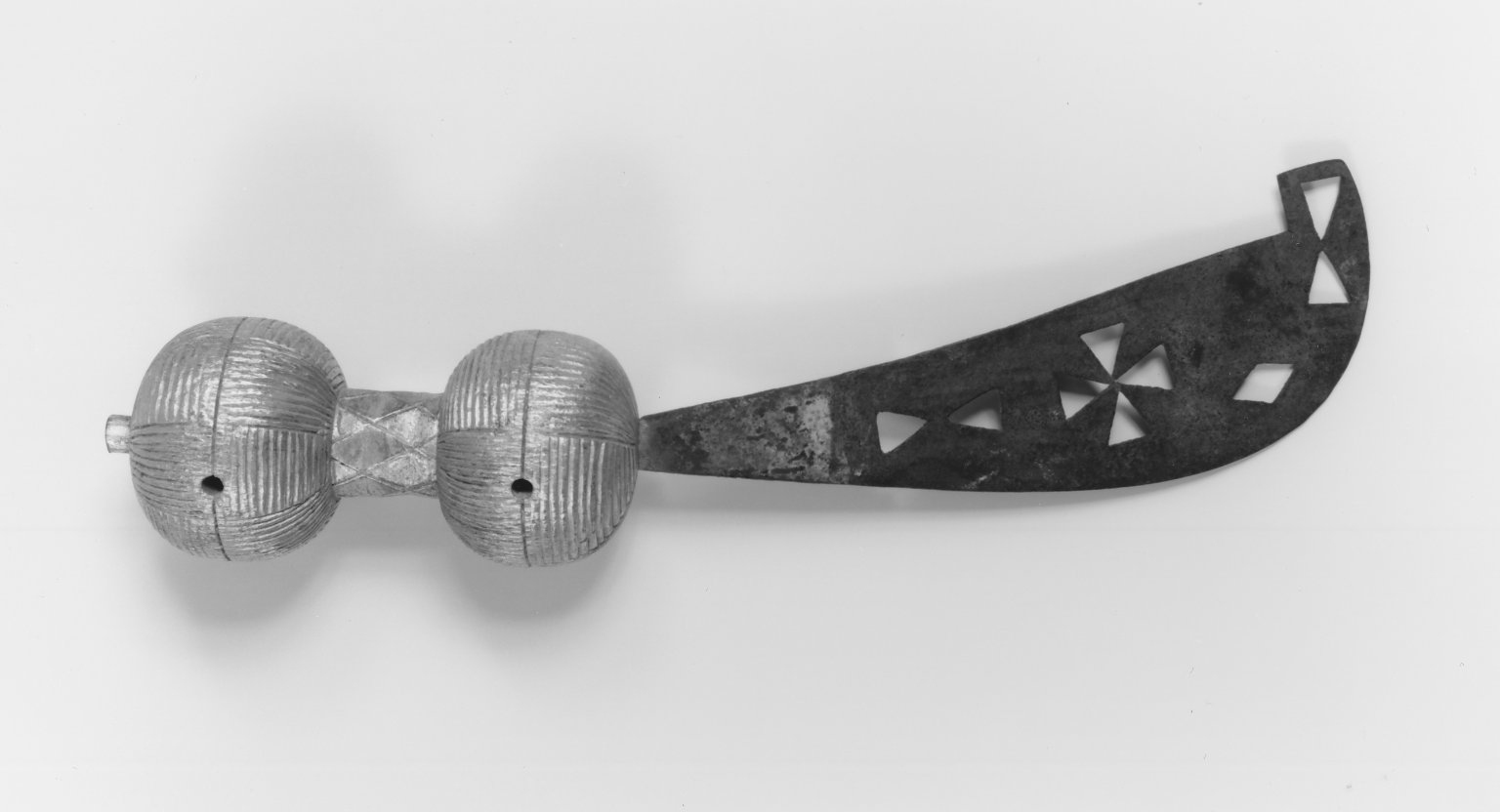
Ashanti ritual akrafena c. 19th – 20th century

The Blazon: The akrafena is used in conjunction with the stool blackening ceremony. Nsuaefena is used in the political ceremony of taking the oath of office by the king and in the swearing oaths of allegiance by subjects of Ashanti City-State. The akrafena also may be carried as a heraldic device, by the Ashanti emperor's-king's emissaries on Ashanti City-State diplomatic missions. In such situations the meaning associated with the symbol embossed on the sheath conveys the message of the mission. Blade of an afenatene sword showing the akoma (heart), denkyem (crocodile), akuma (axe) and the sankofa bird.

The Ashanti national symbol akrafena description:

- The Akrafena is a prominent symbol of the Ashantis in the 18th, 19th and 20th centuries into the 21st century

The akrafena as an Ashanti national symbol has the escutcheon meaning Akrafena ("Symbol of courage, valor, and heroism").

=== History ===
The Ashanti akrafena sword as an Ashanti City-State national symbol was used by the Asantehene in taking the oath of office as ruler of Ashanti City-State. The Omanhene used the Ashanti akrafena to swear the oath of allegiance to the Asantehene and Ashanti City-State. The Ashanti akrafena sword is one of the four principal state swords of the Ashanti City-State. The first Ashanti akfrafena sword was created by Asantehene Nana Opoku Ware I (r. 1731 – 1742), and is the foremost example of akrafena. The mpomponsuo sword symbolizes Responsibility, Power, Loyalty, Bravery, and Authority.

== Akrafena as martial art ==
Akrafena
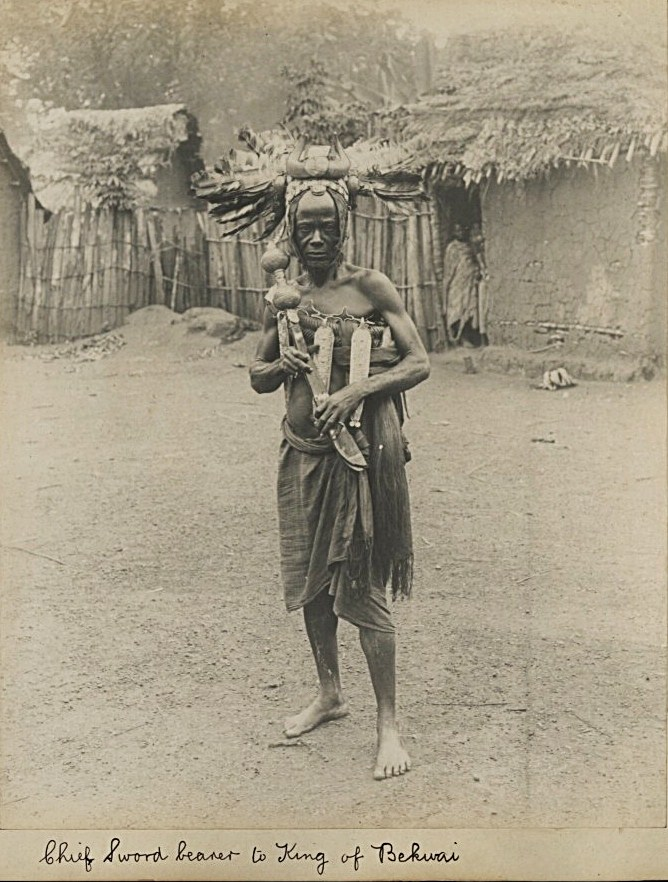
- Chief sword bearer to King of Bekwai, an Ashanti city-state c. 1890s.
- Also known as: Akofena
- Focus: Sword fighting; Knife fighting; Unarmed combat; Street-fighting; Striking attacks; Clinch-fighting
- Hardness: Eclectic/Hybrid
- Country of origin: Ashanti
- Creator: Ashanti City-State
- Famous practitioners: Osei Tutu I; Osei Tutu II
- Olympic sport: No

There are Ashanti City-State schools that hold the techniques of these swords practitioners in the past. The schools hold the genuine Ashanti sword techniques.

It is said that there were 20 fighting postures in training; the Ashanti practitioners of the past generally used low kicking techniques to distract, dismantle and disable the opponent when holding the sword in one hand and sheath in the other. The sword-based fighting techniques is similar in part to that of Colombian grima and Tire machèt, while the combat hand-techniques and kicking techniques are similar in part to that of capoeira.

== Gallery ==
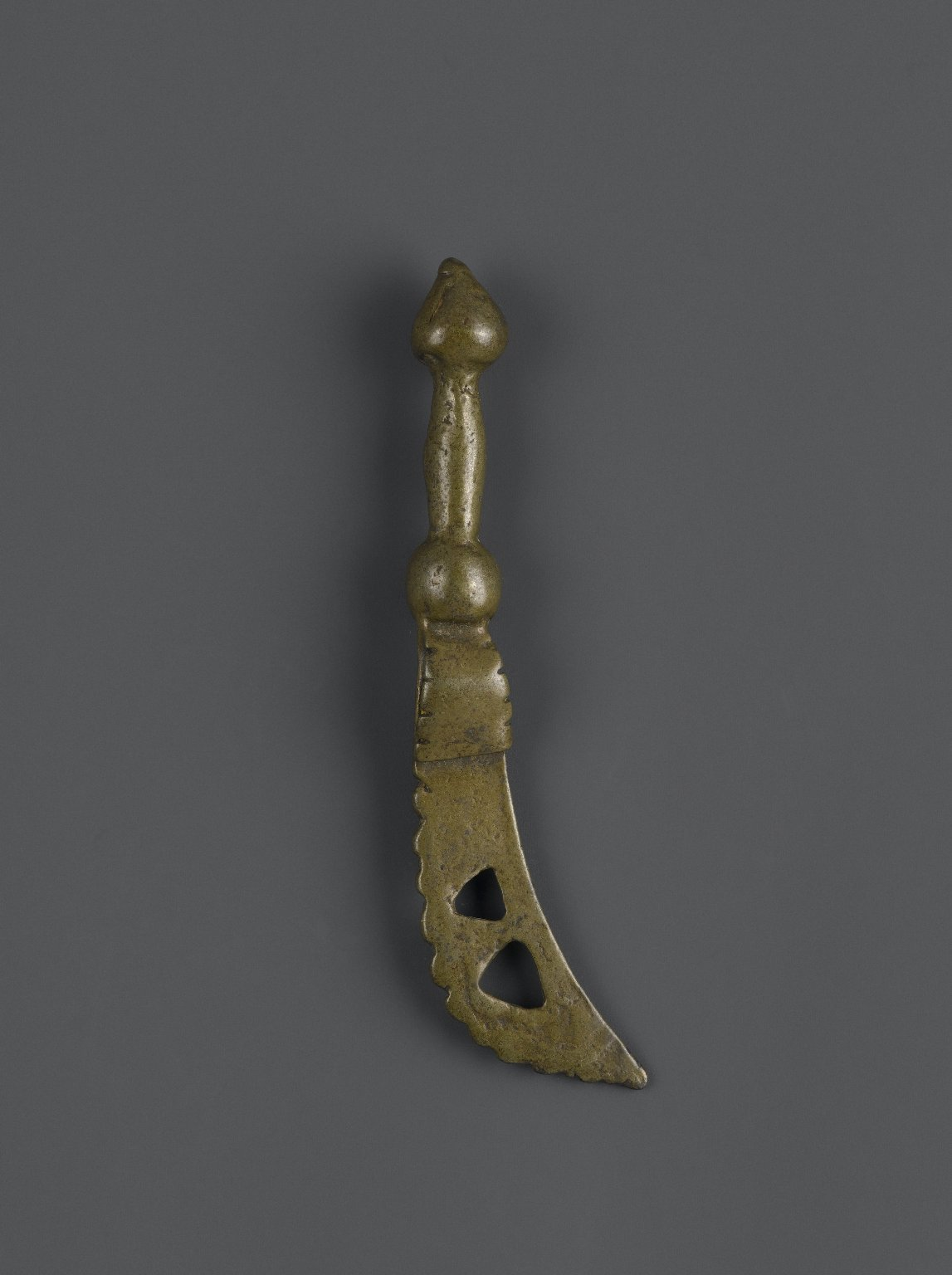
Ashanti 18th to 19th century gold weight Akrafena.

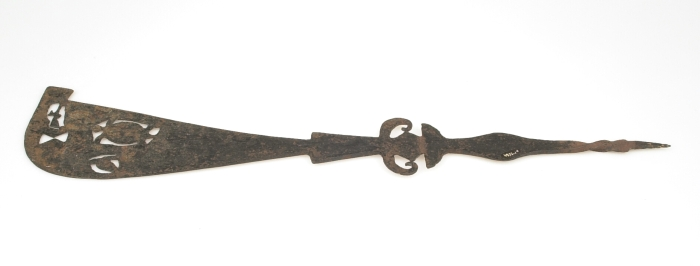
Ashanti ritual Afentene or Akrafena

== See also ==
- Adinkra
