= Cocobalé =

Afro-Puerto Rican martial art

Cocobalé (also Cocobale or Kokobalé) is an Afro-Puerto Rican combat tradition that consists of various combative modalities including unarmed combat, stick-fighting, machete-fighting, as well as various other forms of weaponry. It consists of both combative and folkloric elements, and is closely connected to the musical traditions of Bomba.

== Etymology ==
Miguel Quijano, a living exponent of the art, states the term Cobobalé may have derived from several different sources, one being the term koko, which in Bantu languages "means a mysterious or scary being." He adds that it can also refer to spirits or ancestors. He also notes that the term may derive from several terms from the Yoruba language that translate as "surprising, brilliant, unknown, scared, etc." Finally, he indicates that the term could derive from the word coco, the Spanish word for coconut. Derivations of this word would sometimes, and derisively, be used to refer to Blacks. Finally, Quijano states that the terms could have derived from the term "El Baile De Cocoli," which referred to an Afro-Puerto Rican dance.

Desch Obi suggests that the term derives from the French colonial context, writing about Cocobalé that "This was, however, a stick fight, but the term appears related to the 'French Creole' terms kou (strike) or koko makak (fighting stick)."

== History ==
Cocobalé emerged within the milieu of combative traditions on the island of Puerto Rico, drawing upon African, as well as European sources. The formation of cabildos, or societies based on African ethnicity in the early 19th Century provided spaces for enslaved Africans to retain various cultural traditions, as well as providing a number of social functions. Over time, these groups became more integrated, facilitating the cross-fertilization of various cultures and traditions. This composite of cultures contributed to the formation of Cocobalé. Further, the influence of Spanish fencing and stick-fighting traditions from the Canary Islands (see Jogo de Pau) impacted its development.

== Forms, technique, and music ==
Cocobalé consists of a range of combative modalities including unarmed combat, stick-fighting, and various forms of blade fighting, including the use of the machete. Its unarmed expression, called Cocolembe, bears some similarities to arts like El Juego de Maní and Capoeira, and relies on upright and inverted kicks, palm strikes, blocks, and evasive movements. Cocobalé employs two stick-fighting styles, one that uses a medium-length stick and another that uses a longer stick and is known as Calinda. The former employs various approaches to attack and defense, in addition to dynamic footwork. The latter is related to other forms of the art which are found throughout the African Diaspora. Further, Cocobalé utilizes the machete, as well as the knife. In relation to the machete, it bears some similarities to other Afro-Diasporan machete-fighting arts through its approach to footwork (see Columbian Grima and Tire Machèt).

In addition to its combative repertoire, Cocobalé is closely linked to the Afro-Puerto Rican tradition of Bomba, and, in its folkloric form, incorporates music, song, and dance. Folkoric presentations of Cocobalé generally reflect a simplified form of Afro-Puerto Rican Calinda.
