= Machete fencing =

Machete fencing may refer to:

- Colombian grima in Colombia
- Juego del garrote in Venezuela
- Tire machèt in Haiti
