= Colombian grima =

Sport and art martial practiced in Colombia

Grima
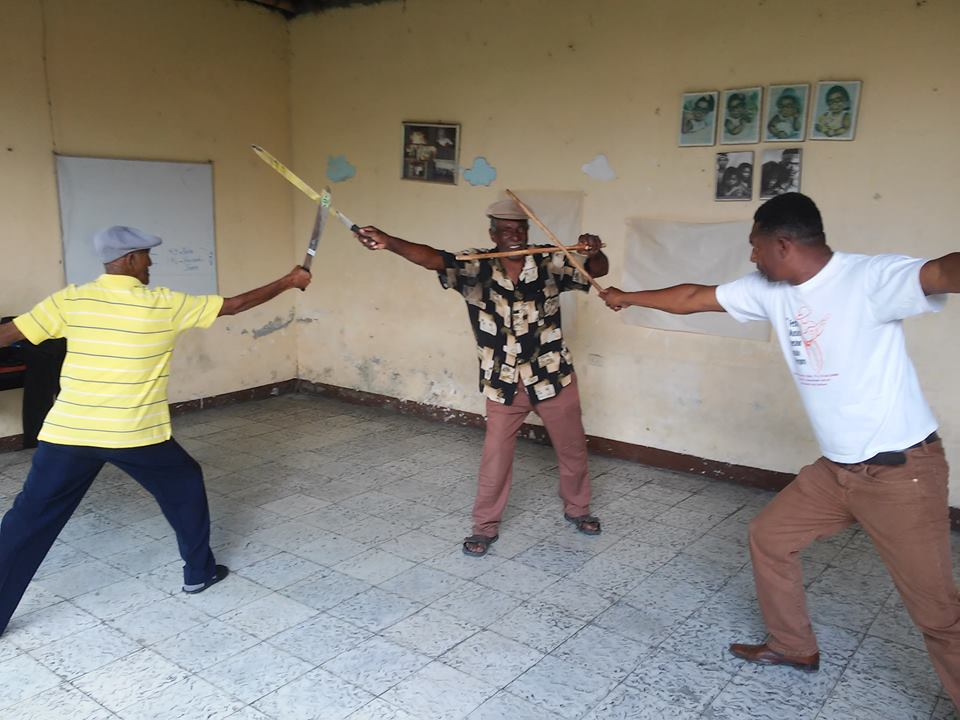
- Colombian Grima maestros (masters)
- Also known as: Colombian grima, Colombian esgrima, Colombian fencing, Colombian machete fencing
- Focus: Machete
- Country of origin: Colombia
- Olympic sport: No

Colombian grima is a martial art that was developed by Afro-Colombian communities during the colonial era that utilizes the use of a machete in combat.

== History ==
Among contemporary masters of the art, there are a number of competing ideas as to the origins of grima. Although there are numerous variants on these, they fall into four groups. The first group views grima as having come from Africa along with enslaved Africans brought to work in the mines of Colombia and the second group traces grima directly to European sword-fighting experts who visited Colombia in colonial times. The third group sees grima's "desgonses" as evidence that Colombian grima was formed by blacks developing their own styles inspired by the European sword-fighting they witnessed, while the fourth group traces grima to the Wars of Independence when it was taught by foreign soldiers to Colombian troops. In the near future comparative research on the fencing histories of the Atlantic World may provide clearer details on the historical relationship between Colombian grima styles and other fencing traditions in the wider Atlantic world.

== Styles ==
There are many different variations of Colombian grima, called "juegos". Juegos differ in utilization and movements.

1. Español Reformado was played at long ranges with long erect stances and linear footwork.
2. Palo Negro was practiced at close range and trained in circular walking patterns.
3. Relancino was similar to Palo Negro but emphasized deceptive attacking combinations and the defensive utilization of low-crouching positions and double handed blocks.

Other examples include Sombra Caucana, Cubano, Español, Venezolano, and Costeño. Each style slightly differs in stance, range, footwork, tactic, and choreographed sequence, but follow the same eight common core strikes and defenses.

== See also ==
- Bajan stick-licking
- BCR (Brick City Rock)
- Capoeira
- Calinda
- Engolo
- Jailhouse rock (fighting style)
- Juego de maní
- Moraingy
- Senegalese wrestling
- Tire machèt
