= Tire machèt =

Haitian martial art

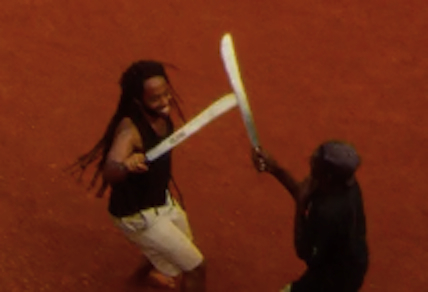
Tire machèt – Cap Rouge, Haiti

Tire machèt ("pull [the] machete") is a Haitian martial art; a form of fencing with machetes.

== Background ==
The origin of the practice lies in the Haitian Revolution of 1791-1804, in which rebel slaves, many armed only with the machetes they had used to cut sugarcane, defeated the French colonial army. Tire machèt combines traditional African combat systems with elements of historical European Sabre fencing. It is traditionally practiced in secret

Haitian master fencer Alfred Avril (d. 2014) was among the first to open up his practice to the world, through a 10-year collaboration with Reginald Turnier and Michael Dylan Rogers of the Haitian Machete Fencing Project. A 2014 documentary short film by Jonathan David Kane, Papa Machete, depicted Alfred Avril training his sons and other students.

== Literature ==
- Desch-Obi, M. Thomas J. (2008). Fighting for Honor: The History of African Martial Art Traditions in the Atlantic World. Columbia: University of South Carolina Press. ISBN 978-1-57003-718-4.

== See also ==
- Bajan stick-licking
- BCR (Brick city rock)
- Capoeira
- Calinda
- Engolo
- Jailhouse rock (fighting style)
- Juego de maní
- Moraingy
- Senegalese wrestling
- Colombian grima
