= Tawuran =

Indonesian youth street fighting custom

Tawuran (or tubir) is a form of customary mass street fighting between gangs of particular school related students in urban Indonesia, especially in the capital city Jakarta. It is practised largely by males in their junior or senior year of high school. This is also popular around Greater Jakarta, where schools often form factions or groups to oppose each other. It's not uncommon for multiple schools to be involved in a single campaign.

Indonesian sociologist Wirumoto has suggested that it serves as a stress release mechanism, as it often occurs following examinations, holiday seasons or graduation. W. D. Mansur has suggested that it results not from personal factors such as religion or personality, but from group dynamics such as solidarity.

Tawuran can result in serious injuries or even death. In 1999 there were 67 deaths. The death toll kept rising. From year 2000's till late 2005's with result 297 deaths, in 2011 82 deaths. A 2013 Al Jazeera report noted the increasing use of acid attacks in tawuran, resulting in severe injury and disfigurement. According to one report, between 2012 and 2017, 130 students were killed.

== See also ==
- Crime in Indonesia
