= Street fighting =

Unsanctioned hand-to-hand combat

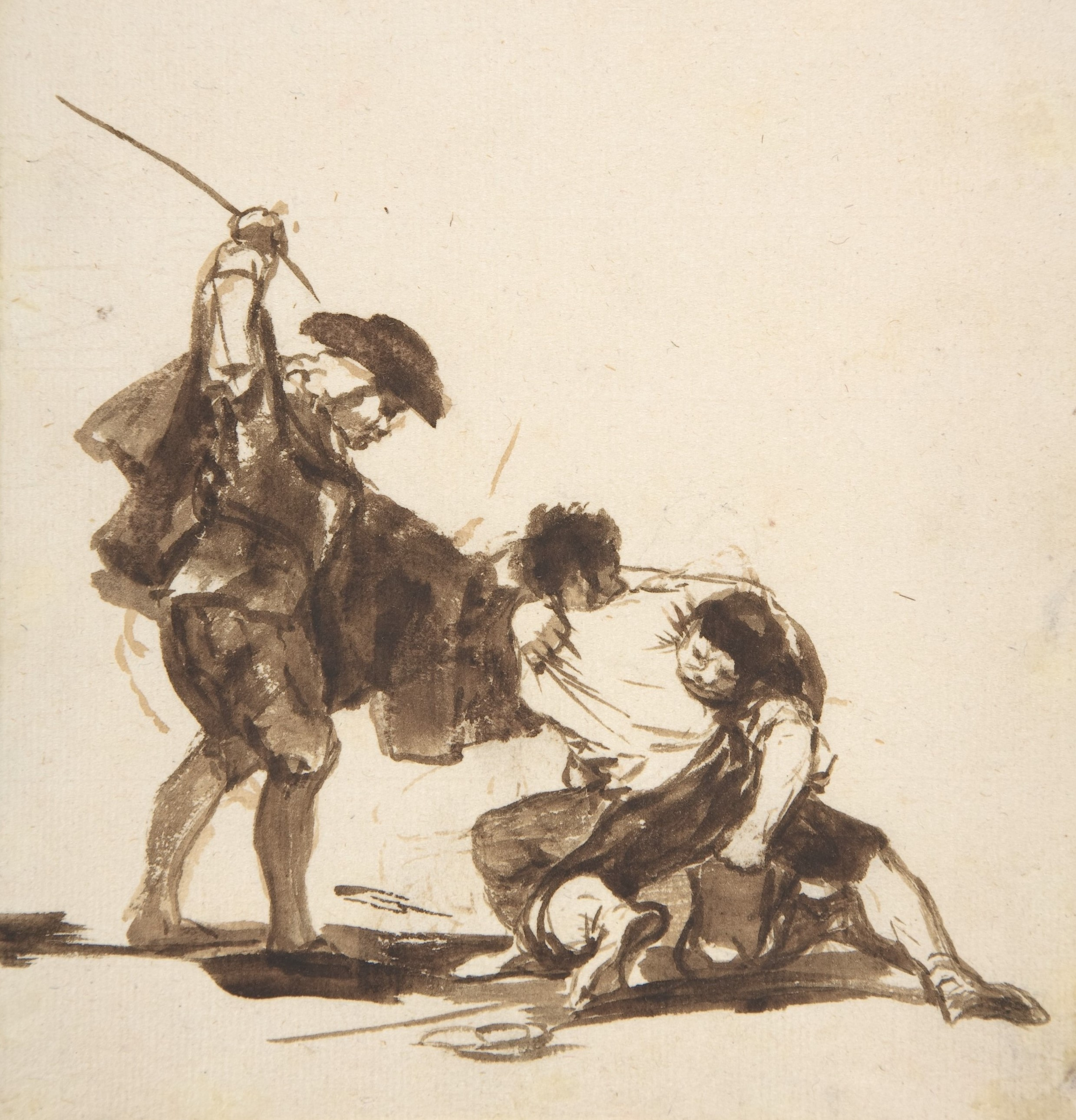
Man Interfering in a Street Fight, Francisco Goya (1812–20)

Street fighting, street combat, street brawl, or simply brawl is hand-to-hand combat in public places between individuals or groups of people. The venue is usually a public place (e.g., a street), and the fight sometimes results in serious injury or even death. Some street fights can be gang related.

A typical situation involves two individuals arguing in a bar, during which dispute one suggests stepping outside, where the fight commences. It is often possible to avoid the fight by withdrawing from the situation, whereas in self-defense, a person is actively trying to escape the confrontation, using force if necessary to ensure their own safety.

In some martial arts communities, street fighting is often considered self-defense.

== History ==
Evidence for human fighting goes back 430,000 years in Spain, where a fossil skull was found with two fractures apparently caused by the same object, implying an intentional lethal attack. Another record of early human fighting is one that happened 9,500 to 10,500 years ago in Nataruk, Kenya. The hunter-gatherers fight was a group fight involving both males and females, including children, armed with bladelets and arrow projectiles. The fight was to protect their valuables such as lands, food and water resources and their tribes or families or to respond mortally to the threat from the encounter between two groups of people.

== Characteristic ==
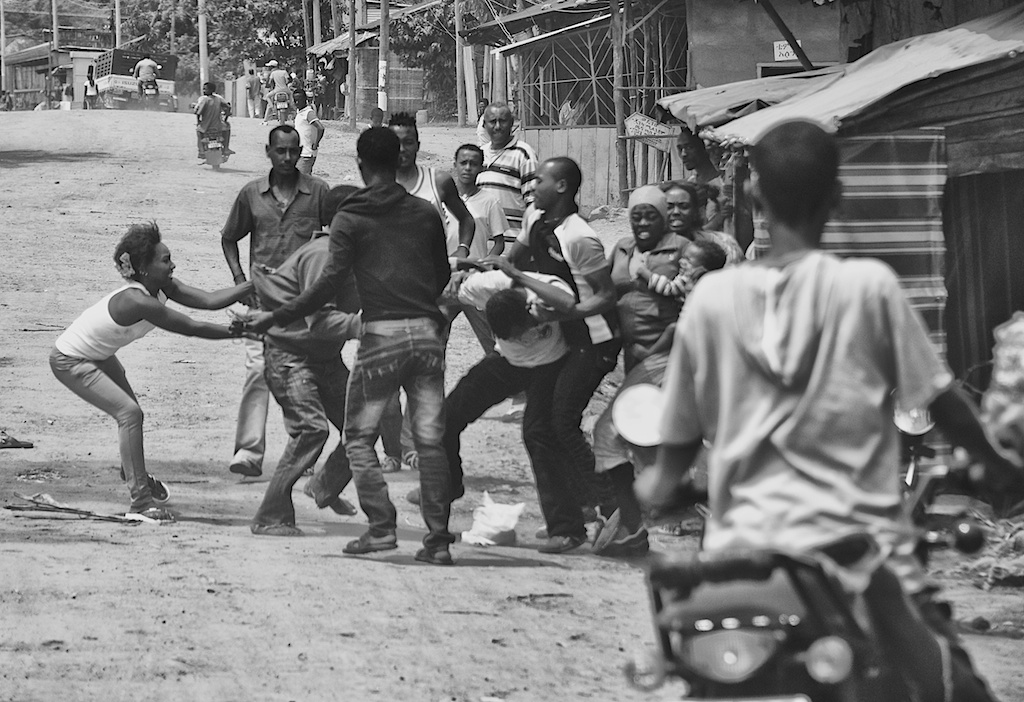
Street fight in Jimma, Ethiopia

Street fights can be planned ahead or occur suddenly, regardless of location and time. The frequency of physical assaults is based on crime rates, level of poverty and accessibility to weapons. In street fights, everyone can be an opponent, including friends, relatives or even strangers. Street fights usually start with an outbreak of emotion such as anger, fear and indignation. Street fights do not last long, usually running for minutes or even seconds. The outcome of the fight is unpredictable due to the fact that participants are unlikely to know others' abilities, strengths or weaknesses.

The scene can go beyond expectation with the introduction of weapons or the participation of someone from the crowd, whether intentional or unintentional.

== Causes ==
The causes of street fighting are varied. Originally, street fighting was a way of defending oneself. In the Stone Age, fights were mostly aimed for survival purposes – protecting territory, securing resources and defending families. According to Mike Martin, a London lecturer in war studies, "Humans fight to achieve status and belonging. They do so because, in evolutionary terms, these are the surest routes to survival and increased reproduction".

As humans evolve, new conflicts arise in order to gratify more sophisticated wants. The purposes of street fighting shifted to solve interpersonal conflicts. These conflicts could be stratification, misunderstanding, hate speech or even retaliation. For instance, in areas that are not under police surveillance and criminally dominated, violence is believed to be the substantiation of superior reputation and pride. In other words, people take part in street fights to obtain dominance because of social status given to the ruler. For another instance, men showed off their value in the sense that opponents' self-esteem is on the verge of being destroyed from their insults, humiliation and vilification to which violence is the go-to resort. Additionally, some fights are driven by alcohol. Alcohol itself does not directly lead to violence but it acts as a catalyst, allowing cheers from the crowds or provocation from opponents to ignite the fight between fighters. Since the consumption of alcohol negatively impacts the brain function, drunk people fail to assess the situation which often results in overreacting and unpredictable fights.

== Effects ==
=== Biological ===
It is theorized that certain biological features of the Homo lineage have evolved over time as a means to mitigate injury from hand-to-hand combat. Facial robusticity, which includes traits such as jaw adductor muscle strength and brow ridge size, may offer a protective effect against combat. The jaw adductors (the masseter and the temporalis) stretch as a means to absorb energy from the punch in order to reduce the likelihood of jaw dislocation and prevent fracture. The postcanine teeth may have evolved to be larger and thicker so as to allow the energy from the punch to be transferred from the jaw to the skull. Additionally, the proportion of the human hands have evolved in a way that allows for the formation of a fist, something that was not possible in pre-Homo species.

=== Physical and mental health ===
The consequences of street fighting are undeniably dangerous and critical, and street fighters are exposed to short-term and long-term physical health issues. Such poor health includes temporary and permanent disabilities, fractures, partial body part losses, severe injuries, or death. For instance, the face, other parts of the head and neck, and the thorax are the most targeted parts in the body, which account for 83%, 4% and 2% of fractures, respectively, amongst all injuries. In addition to damaging physical health, street fighting can also result in mental illness, such as post-traumatic stress disorder, substance abuse and depression.

Traumatic exposure in small children to such negative experience often leads to post-traumatic stress reactions, such as fear, sadness, numbness, timidity, moodiness, eating disorders, difficulty sleeping, or nightmares.

=== Legal ===
Street fighting is usually illegal due to its disruption of public order. Depending on each localities' laws and the gravity of the situation, participants may be liable to either a fine or imprisonment. In South Australia, for example, the maximum penalty for the offence of fighting in public is a $1,250 fine or three months imprisonment. In New South Wales, Australia, persons involved in a fight that could intimidate the public can be charged by the police for the offence of affray with a maximum punishment of ten years imprisonment. If any injuries are caused during the fight, the severity of the injury will impact the penalty of the participants. Intentional injuries, especially, will result in more severe penalties. One may still be liable for the injuries of the victim even if the injuries were not directly caused by that person but by another participating in the fight. If someone dies, all members in the group that are involved in the assault may be accused of murder, no matter who inflicted the fatal blow. Self-defence is generally too narrow to provide protection.

=== Economic ===
In terms of economics, street fights result in damage to social infrastructure. In 2000, a fund worth approximately 9 million euros was spent in order to repair previous three-year demolition done by street fighters. In 1995 in Basque city, the destruction of public transport resulting from street fights cost 2.5 million euros.

== Underground street fight clubs ==
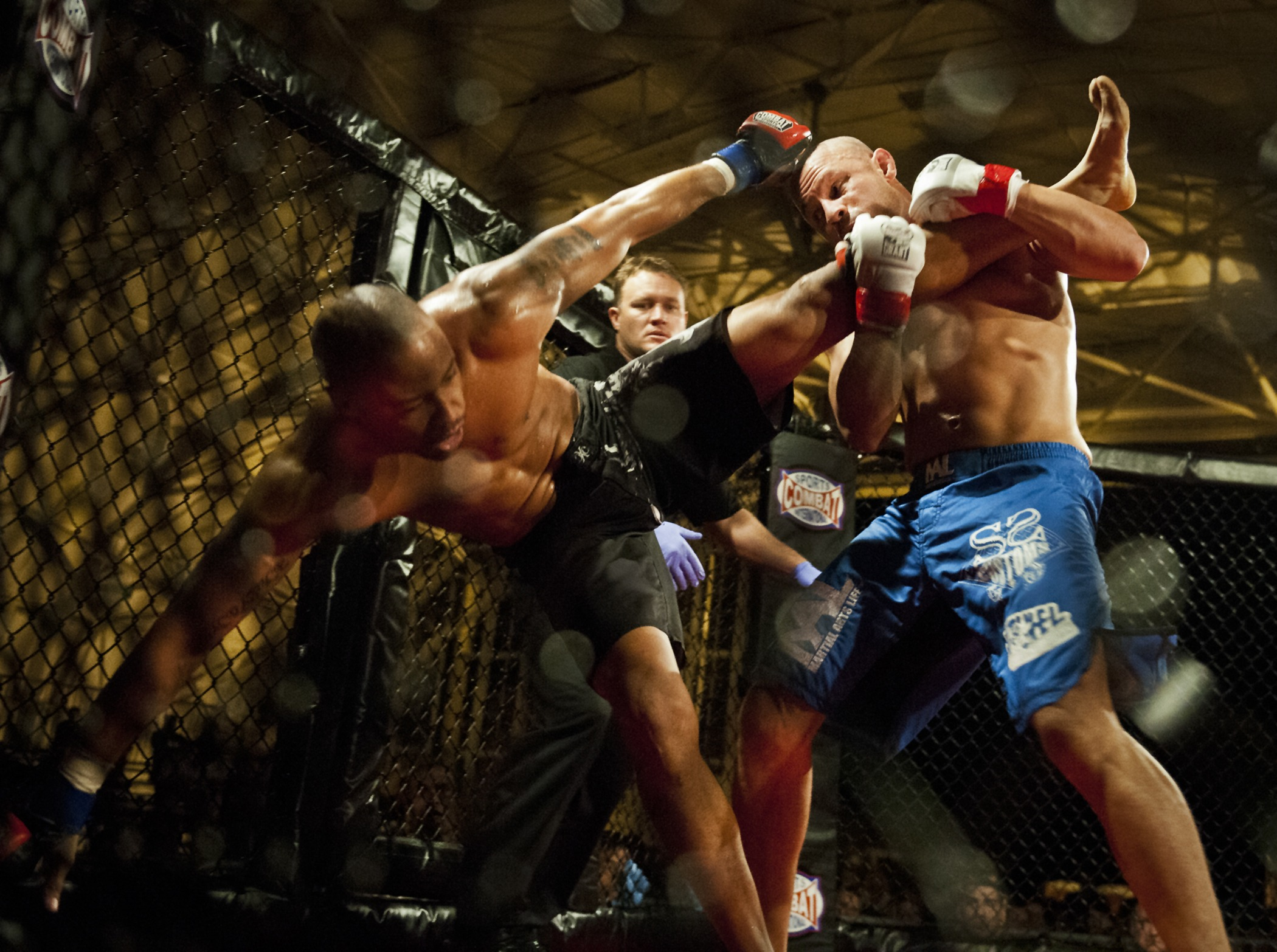
Fight between two men

Street fights used to happen in the dark, out of communal sight. With the exposure to social media, however, street fights have become more transparent. Organisers that help with professional street fight setup are known as "clubs", which are run on a money-oriented basis. These clubs can host either amateur underground fights or professional ones. In New York, professional fighters are those who contend for the prize (money or gift) which has monetary value exceeding $75. In contrast, amateur fights also known as 'smokers' refer to unsanctioned fights where no safeguards and regulations are required.

Despite the fact that some illegal fight clubs still run within the authorisers' competence, some street fight clubs even obtain authoritative approval, meaning these sanctioning entities are running under the supervision of a certified regulator. Some further requirements for professional fights enacted by New York State Athletics Commission (NYSAC) include:

- Medical check-ups for participants before and after the fight
- A minimum attendance of one commission-designated doctor and an ambulance with medical personnel equipped with appropriate resuscitation kits to be on scene
- Medical insurance must be provided to participants
- The venue must meet safety requirements

Pre-fight medical check-ups are required to ensure that the participants are not involved with drugs or infectious diseases such as HIV, Hepatitis or any other illnesses. Any fights that are not in compliance with the authoriser rules and regulations are considered illegal and the participants will have to face legal penalty. The venue of the fight is changed every time for confidential protection and will be announced on the fight day. The promoters are in charge of finding different locations to host these fights where indoor boxing rings, gyms or gym mats with crowd-form barricade are utilised as a disguise so as not to attract the public attention. Amongst incentives that draw people into underground street fights, money oriented and attention seeking are the two most fundamental one. In order to qualify for the fight, attendees have to go through a registration process. The fight is either between two randomly matched applicants whose identity will be kept until the matching day or between two attendees with unresolved conflicts. Sometimes, it can be between 2 fighters urging to start their MMA career that get matched right on the registration spot. Attendees are required to comply with the rules set by the club. The grant price is usually given to the winner only, but sometimes both people can be paid. The club is funded by entrance tickets sold to audiences with undisclosed amounts. The audience may have to go through a security check for weapons as they are not allowed inside the venue. On several occasions, the audience gamble on the result of the fight, particularly, they place their bet on one of the attendees that they expect to win in the hope of a worthy return. The fight lasts for three rounds, sometimes an additional round is conducted because the crowd's provocation fuels the combativeness of the attendees.

== Notable street fighters ==
- Bruce Lee: Lee was known for engaging in street fights before he started training in martial arts, and continued to street fight while training. He challenged students from rival schools, cross-trained in several disciplines, and eventually developed the hybrid martial art of Jeet Kune Do.
- Chuck Wepner: A retired professional boxer. He was once a street fighter and took part in multiple street fights from a young age.
- Haku: Professional wrestler with a fearsome reputation for street fighting and resisting arrest.
- Ken Shamrock: He engaged in paid street fights with a pro wrestler prior to his mixed martial arts (MMA) career.
- Tank Abbott: He engaged in many street fights before beginning his professional career with UFC.
- Josh Barnett: Former UFC Heavyweight Champion Barnett engaged in street fights that he organized online prior to his professional MMA career.
- Kimbo Slice: He started his career participating in street fights and gained public recognition after footage of him defeating his opponents went viral on the internet. In his first taped fight against a man named Big D, Ferguson left a large cut on his opponent's right eye which led internet fans to call him "Slice", becoming the last name to his already popular childhood nickname, Kimbo.
- Jorge Masvidal: He was a known street fighter prior to his professional MMA career, including fighting and beating Kimbo Slice's protégé "Ray."
- Eddie Alvarez: Former UFC Lightweight Champion Alvarez engaged in street fights due to a lack of opportunity before his professional career.
- Nate Diaz: He has engaged in several street fights during his professional fighting career.
- Lenny McLean: An English unlicensed boxer, bouncer, bodyguard, businessman and actor. He was known as "The Guv'nor", "the King of the Cobbles" and "the hardest man in Britain".

== Bar fights ==
A bar fight, sometimes known as a pub brawl, is a type of street fight that happens in bars, pubs, and taverns. It is commonly depicted in fiction, most notably in Hollywood films and crime video games.

== See also ==
- Gouging (fighting style)
- Jailhouse rock (fighting style)
- Mixed martial arts
- Vale Tudo
- Mutual combat
- Slapboxing
- Streetbeefs
- Tawuran, mass street fighting between gangs of students in Indonesia
- Trial by combat
