= Jailhouse rock (fighting style) =

Martial art apparently created in US jails

- Also known as: 52 Hand Blocks; 52 Blocks
- Focus: Hybrid
- Hardness: Full-contact
- Country of origin: United States
- Date of formation: Either: Between 17th or 19th century; Around 1960s and 1970s.
- Famous practitioners: See notable practitioners
- Parenthood: Knocking and kicking Boxing
- Ancestor arts: Dambe; Engolo; Folk wrestling
- Descendant arts: Mixed Martial Arts (MMA)
- Related arts: Capoeira; Breakdancing
- Olympic sport: No

Jailhouse rock (or colloquially 52 Blocks; abbreviated JHR) is system, or collection, of fighting styles that were practiced and developed within urban Black communities, commonly noted as being first mentioned in the 1960s and 1970s.

The many different manifestations of JHR share a commonality in blending western boxing with other stylized martial arts techniques. The basic principle of these styles is constant improvisation, blocks and effectiveness in real-life situations - Particularly, very tight spaces like a prison cell or a dark alley.

52 Hand Blocks has been referenced numerous times by contemporary media including by journalist Douglas Century's Street Kingdom: Five Years Inside the Franklin Avenue Posse, as well as numerous Wu-Tang Clan songs and Ted Conover's book Newjack. Recently, celebrities including actor Larenz Tate and rapper Ludacris have taken up the fighting system for film roles and self-defense, shining a brighter light on this previously underground martial art.

== History ==
"Jailhouse" comes from the enigmatically carceral origins of the fighting style and "rock" meaning "to sway or tilt violently back and forth," highlighting the system of continuous motion ("rocking") and tight, evasive shielding. This shielding is what connects the "blocks" name also recognized.

The origin of the name "52 Hand Blocks" has been widely contested. Many sources identify the following origins, which may all be true:

- Derived from the reference of the fifty-two blocking techniques encompassed in the fighting-style. These techniques consist of traditional western boxing blocks, covers and parries but also include elbow strikes and blocks, knees, head butts and other martial arts techniques.
- May be a reference to the playing card game of 52 pickup and to the expression "let the cards fall where they may".
- May be derived from a reference to a specific cell block, most likely in New York
- Some supernatural origins connect 52 to the Supreme Mathematics of the Nation of Gods and Earths.

JHR, or 52 Blocks, is also called “wall fighting” referring to the inherently close quarter hand combat techniques.

=== Origins ===
The existence of this martial art was originally somewhat debated, but mainstream media exposure has contributed towards raising the awareness of the martial art.

According to Dennis Newsome, a well-known JHR practitioner, JHR is an indigenous African American fighting art that has its origins in the 17th and 18th centuries, when slaves were first institutionalized and needed to defend themselves. JHR has been connected to the "Virginia Scufflin" boxing style practiced by slaves in the 1800s. It may be the case that slaves would fight for self-liberation, the freedom of their families, and to re-unite with their families.

Oral tradition has the skill evolving secretly within the U.S. penal system, with regional styles reflecting the physical realities of specific institutions. This theory relates JHR to the fusion of African and European/American bare-knuckle fist-fighting styles known as "cutting", which is said to have been practiced by champions such as Tom Molineaux, and also to the little-known African-American fighting skill known as "knocking and kicking", which is said to be practiced clandestinely in parts of the Southern US and on the Sea Islands.

Alternatively, it may be that JHR was not a product of penal institutions, but rather an evolution of the many African martial arts or fighting games which were practiced by slaves, with different styles evolving separately in different penal institutions. According to this theory, some people believe Jailhouse Rock may be a modern American manifestation of the many African martial arts that were disseminated throughout the African diaspora, comparable to martial arts including Afro-Brazilian Capoeira, Afro-Cuban Mani and Afro-Martinican Ladja.

It has a mythological origin story of having originated in the US penal institutions back in the 1960s and 1970s. Some have cast doubt on this origin story, as the teaching of fighting systems by inmates is generally not allowed in jails and prisons. However, others point out that the experience of any given prisoner, as well as the enforcement of the rules, varies enormously from one institution to the next, and that a great deal of prisoner life occurs in secret and necessarily in violation of the institutional rules.

=== Contemporary emergence ===
JHR was initially practiced by veterans from the Vietnam War.

The 52 Hand Blocks aspect of JHR was first featured in Black Belt Magazine in the 1970s. It was then followed by a key reference in Douglas Century's nonfiction book Street Kingdom. This book played a key role because it introduced one of 52 Blocks most senior living practitioners; Kawaun "Big K" Adon. Adon would unite with martial arts historian Daniel Marks and fitness innovator Hassan Yasin to form the organization Constellation. This organization would motivate the authorship of essays like "Freeing the Afrikan Mind: the Role of Martial Arts in Contemporary African American Cultural Nationalism" by Professor Tom Green of Texas A&M University.

The peak emergence of 52 Hand Blocks coincided with the "Golden Era" of martial arts in America when Asian martial arts teachers began arriving in America and Chinese cinema was booming.

This martial art style became more accessible and public at the beginning of the 21st century.

Actor and martial arts expert Michael Jai White noted that in his youth, martial arts schools were not easily accessible as there were few of them and they weren’t a money making incentive, especially JHR because the training is serious and brutal.

== Principles ==
JHR practitioner, Diallo Nkenge Frazier, claims that the foundational elements from enslavement, then imprisonment, brought forth the following principles, "warriors" are to fight for:

- Freedom
- Family
- Liberation
- Unity

== Mythology ==
Tales of the pugilistic exploits of the infamous 1970s New York prison fighter "Mother Dear," allegedly known for fighting in drag have also contributed to the extensive urban mythology surrounding this system.

== Techniques ==
JHR is for close quarters combat, ideally for "fighting in a closet or on a staircase." This often requires the use of the elbow, a headbutt, or a knee instead of a jab or a cross. The elbow is often used when somebody has a long-range punch stance or if a fighter wants to break their opponent's fingers or hand. Elbows may be referred to as "bows." Although a close quarters hand combat technique, the 52 Block also utilizes leg techniques, through the front kick, the knee strike and the stomp. But is ultimately about blocking first.

As JHR is a hybrid, unsystematic martial art, many teachers and practitioners leverage their experience in other arts and incorporate "fighting to the death" techniques. Some of these elements include like gun disarms, joint locks, knife defense and knife offense. JHR is an inherently evolving art.

== Styles ==
JHR is divided into various regional styles. These include:

- 42nd
- "52 Hand Blocks" or "52"
- Bum Rush
- Closing Gates
- Comstock Style
- Coxsacki Style
- Gorilla
- Mount Meg
- San Quentin Style
- Stato
- Woodbourne Style

== Notable practitioners ==
- Kawaun "Big K" Adon
- Mahaliel Bethea (aka Prof. Mo)
- Lyte Burly
- Diallo Frazier
- Kid Gavilan in the Coxsacki-style
- Lorenzo Hunt
- Zab Judah
- Ludacris
- Dennis Newsome (aka Mestre Preto Velho)
- Floyd Patterson in the Coxsacki-style
- Miguel Piñero
- Wesley Snipes
- Larenz Tate
- Mike Tyson
- Michael Jai White

== In popular media ==
=== Films ===
Larenz Tate underwent extensive training in the 52 Blocks variant of Jailhouse rock for his 2011 film Gun Hill.

Mel Gibson was trained in Jailhouse Rock by Dennis Newsome, for his part in the first Lethal Weapon film.

=== Music ===
The style is also referred to in many rap songs by artists such as the Wu-Tang Clan, notably by members Method Man & Redman in the song "1, 2, 1, 2".

=== Video games ===
Def Jam: Fight for NY uses this for the street fighting style in game.

== See also ==
- Gouging (fighting style)
- Bare-knuckle boxing
- Street fighting

== Bibliography ==
- Svinth, Joseph R.; Green, Thomas A. (2010). Martial Arts of the World: An Encyclopedia of History and Innovation. ABC-CLIO. ISBN 9781598842432.

== Sources ==
- 52 Blocks Constellation Inc, Changing of the Guard: The History of 52 Blocks an American Martial Art (2009), documentary
- Douglas Century, Street Kingdom: Five Years Inside the Franklin Avenue Posse, Warner Books, 2000, ISBN 0-446-67563-6
- Douglas Century, "Ghetto Blasters: Born in prison, raised in the 'hood, the deadly art of 52 Blocks is Brooklyn's baddest secret", Details magazine 19:9, pp 77–79, August 2001.
- Dennis Newsome, Jailhouse Rock (A.k.a.) 52 blocks system.
- "Os Malandros de Mestre Touro". Archived from the original on 2020-01-11.
- Green, Thomas "Freeing the Afrikan Mind: the Role of Martial Arts in Contemporary African American Cultural Nationalism", essay featured in "Martial Arts in the Modern World", Praeger Publishers, 2003, ISBN 0-275-98153-3
- Justin Porter (June 17, 2009). "In Tight, a New (Old) Martial Art Gains Followers". New York Times.
- J.S. Soet, 'Martial Arts Around the World, Unique Publications, 1991
- J.S. Soet, 'Martial Arts Around the World II, Unique Publications, 2001
- "Fighting Arts International", Vol. 8, No. 2, 1987
