= Knocking and kicking =

African-American martial art

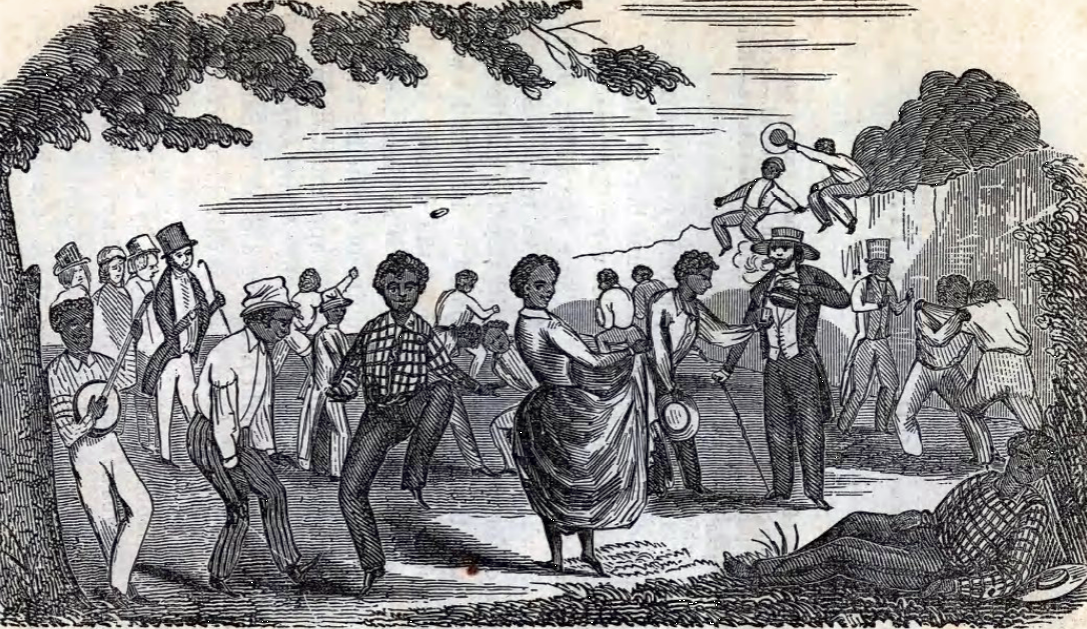
- The Sabbath among slaves, 1849. People practice martial arts in the background.
- Also known as: Kicking and knocking
- Focus: kicks, headbutts, evasions, acrobatic
- Country of origin: United States
- Ancestor arts: engolo
- Related arts: capoeira, danmyé

Knocking and kicking (or yuna onse) is a little-known traditional African-American dance-like martial art, arguably practiced clandestinely in parts of the Southern US and on the Sea Islands.

Music and acrobatic movements made knocking and kicking inseparable from dance. Knocking and kicking was secretly performed within the black community. These performances were set to the beat of drums, clapping, or the accompaniment of reed pipes known as "quills."

Some authors find that this art originates from engolo, and cognates with capoeira and danmyé.

== Name ==
"Knocking" referred to a specific charging headbutt, mimicking African cattle, resulting in a distinct "knock" sound upon impact.

Knocking was connected to kicking in name but often remained distinct. Masters of the kicking art also practiced the more widespread headbutting duels, but in the drum circles, kicks and acrobatics were the primary techniques.

== Origin ==
Desch-Obi argues that Knocking and kicking is a composite art, consisted of distinct kicking and headbutting practices of Angolan peoples. He finds that knocking and kicking, ladjia and capoeira have the most similar techniques within African diaspora, probably derived from Bantu martial art engolo.

== History ==
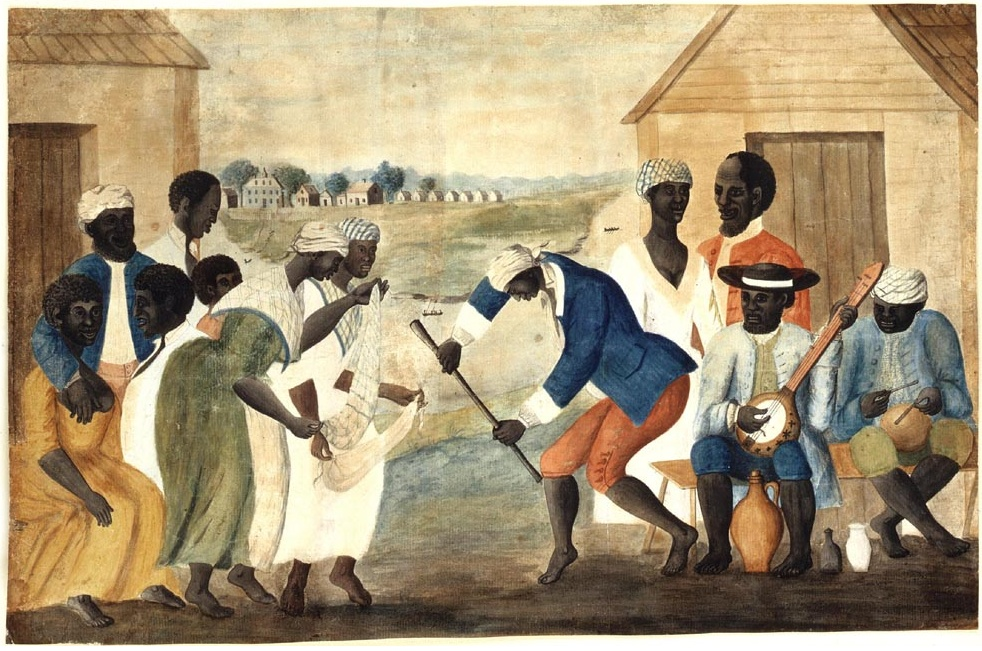
The Old Plantation, Angolan stick dance to banjo, South Carolina, 1780s

The world didn't know about it, but they brought [knocking and kicking] from Africa and disguised it in the context of religion to cover it up, to keep the white man from getting at it. And that was their weapon to fight with.

— Herman Carter, historian

During the slavery, knocking and kicking was notably practiced in the states of South Carolina and Virginia. Holloway and Wood found that Angolans were the predominant portion of the slaves in South Carolina.

Following the abolition of slavery, this martial art continued to be a secret cultural practice, frequently showcased in public contests and local intra-village competitions. It held a role within African-American secret societies, contributing to the physical and ritual aspects of these groups.

In the 20th century, several sources confirmed the effectiveness of the knocking and kicking. Some witnessed James Cohen knocking people out with a single headbutt, while other claimed he could even knock out a cow with his head. Elders from Lady's Island, South Carolina, vividly recall "Heavy Dick" Miller, a feared kicker who won most of his fights with his exceptional high and inverted kicks.

In recent years, there has been a renewed effort to document and revive knocking and kicking as part of African-American cultural heritage. Notably, T.J. Desch-Obi has emphasized the importance of South Carolina in the prominence of this martial art.

== Techniques ==
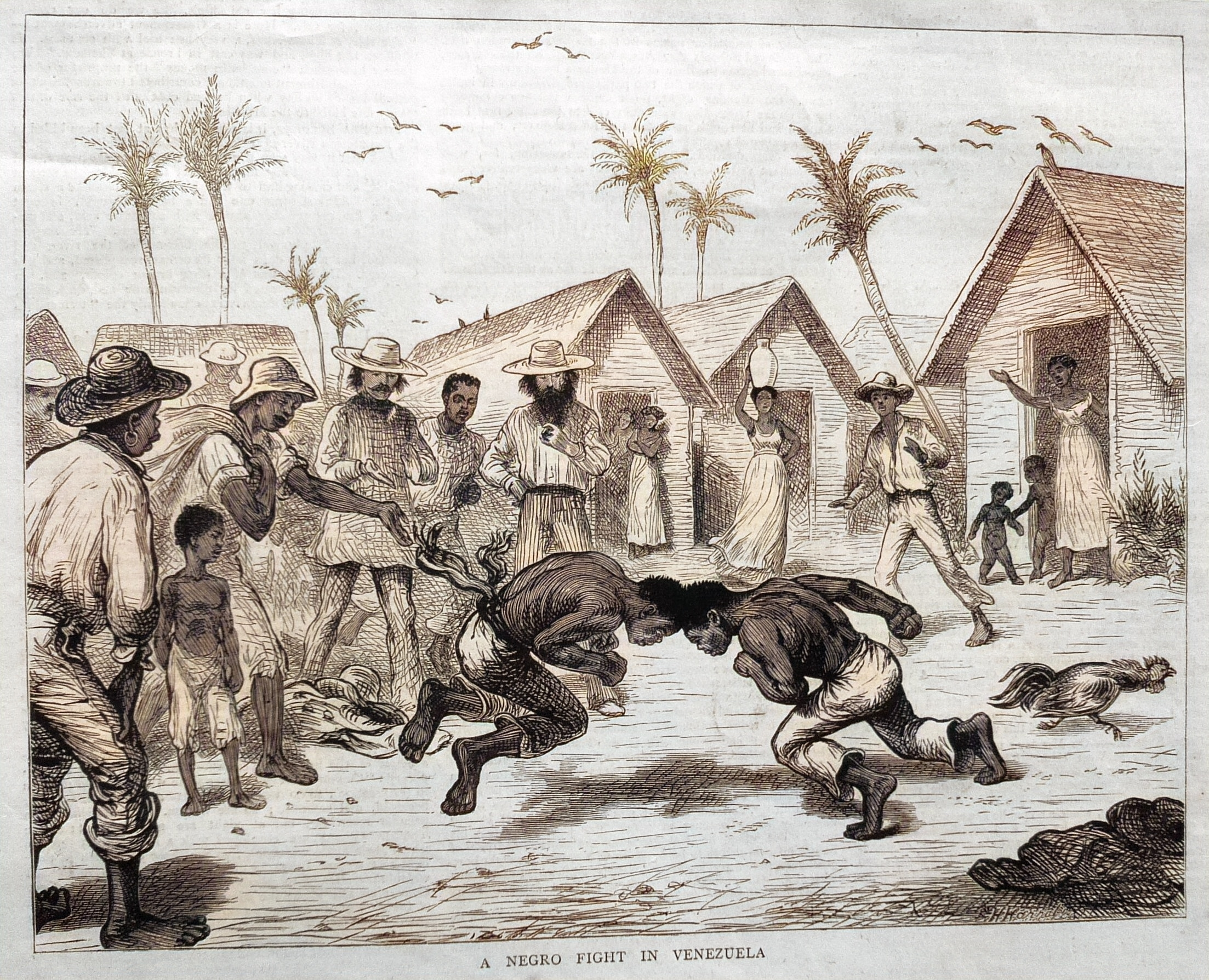
A Negro fight in South America, 1874.

The blows are made by kicking, knocking, and butting with their heads; they grab each other by their ears, and jam their heads together like sheep. If they are likely to hurt each other very bad, their masters would rap them with their walking canes, and make them stop. After fighting, they make friends, shake hands, and take a dram together, and there is no more of it.

— Henry Bibb, a runaway slave from Kentucky, 1849.

This art's leg techniques included many sweeps, likely inspired by the engolo style. The "cross-step" technique, which knocks an opponent off his feet, usually used as a counter to a kick or when facing a boxer. Another sweep technique was the "catman," executed while standing.

Some author believes that in ritual use, headbutting and foot kicking were traditionally practiced separately.

== Interpretations ==
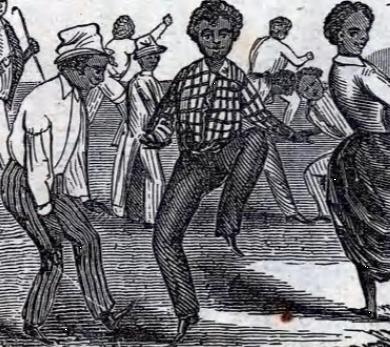
The Sabbath among slaves (detail)

According to Gwaltney, knocking and kicking originally had sacred purpose, to protect the elders of the Old Religion. Gwaltney characterizes knocking and kicking as "the ancient martial art practiced by clergy among the enslaved and their followers." These "clergy" endorsed its open practice only during their secret gatherings. These groups were essentially "cults centered around local extended families, which also convened during larger, public celebrations." These larger, though still clandestine, gatherings were often referred to as "drum meetings." The fact that the art involved physical inversions, hints its potential role in the past as a means to access spiritual power from across the kalunga within the Old Time Religion.

Knocking and kicking may have influenced the distinctive religious expression of African-American Christian communities, such as the revivalist Christian ring shouts, albeit in an adapted form. The clandestine nature of these societies restricted the widespread dissemination of this martial art.

== Literature ==
- Assunção, Matthias Röhrig (2002). Capoeira: The History of an Afro-Brazilian Martial Art. Routledge. ISBN 978-0-7146-8086-6.
- Desch-Obi, M. Thomas J. (2008). Fighting for Honor: The History of African Martial Art Traditions in the Atlantic World. Columbia: University of South Carolina Press. ISBN 978-1-57003-718-4.

== See also ==
- Cabeçada
- Capoeira
- Engolo
