= Brick City Rock =

Regional martial arts style from New Jersey, U.S.

BCR (Brick City Rock)
- Focus: Hybrid
- Country of origin: United States
- Parenthood: Jailhouse rock (fighting style)
- Olympic sport: No

BCR (Brick City Rock) is one of the regional manifestations of the Jailhouse rock (fighting style). It can be traced in origin to Newark, New Jersey during the late-1960s and early-1970s.

During this time, BCR was trained primarily in communal "cliques" of mostly Afro-Caribbean and African-American youths during informal sparring sessions set to music known as "Rock Parties". BCR was also trained perhaps more commonly, through impromptu Slap-Boxing matches in the inner-city of Newark N.J. and the surrounding areas.

Brick City Rock shares a commonality with some forms of ADMA (African Diaspora Martial Arts) in that it is trained through a communal sport/game "play" structure set to music.

Practitioners of BCR claim to reject training sequences and encourage spontaneous adaption of techniques in response to the objective at hand.

BCR is typified by its footwork and movements that resembled improvised dance moves.
