= Streetbeefs =

Backyard fighting club

Streetbeefs (StreetBeefs, STREETBEEFS or Street Beefs) is an American backyard fighting club and YouTube channel founded by Virginia resident Christopher "Scarface" Wilmore in 2008 (Note: The YouTube channel was started in 2009.) that hosts fighting events with combat sports mediums such as boxing, kickboxing, jiujitsu, and mixed martial arts. Wilmore hosts the events at various locations on the East Coast, with their primary base of operations being located in Harrisonburg, Virginia. They have fighters of varied skill levels, but they are notable for providing an avenue for inexperienced fighters outside of more formal amateur competitions. Since there is no admission fee, and no payment, it is not regulated by the state athletic commission.

Wilmore originally founded the organization to help settle disputes and provide an alternative to more dangerous forms of street violence. During the early days of its inception, they had no medical professionals present, but now they have a registered nurse as well as several staff members trained in first aid and CPR. Streetbeefs now has another branch called Streetbeefs West Coast which operates out of Las Vegas, Nevada.. The 2016 New York Times documentary Backyard Fight Club: Guns to Gloves features Wilmore telling his story.

Weight classes are enforced, and fighters are asked to provide ID to confirm that they are over the age of 18, and fighters can sign up via the Streetbeefs Facebook page, the Streetbeefs Instagram, or the STREETBEEFS HQ website.

In "beef matches", there are no weight classes, and no winner is declared and both participants are encouraged to shake hands and end their dispute.

12 ounce boxing gloves are utilized for boxing and kickboxing, and 4-ounce MMA gloves are used for MMA.

As of May 2025, the Streetbeefs YouTube channel currently has over 1.3 billion views and over 4.2 million subscribers. Streetbeefs has also received nationwide coverage by many major publications, including The New York Times, The Washington Post, ESPN, and The New Yorker among various others.

Streetbeefs also has a large following in Germany, appearing in major German newspaper Die Zeit, and has appeared in two separate German television programs, including a television program in Austria.

Fighters and regular people who want to fight have made the journey to fight in the Streetbeefs yard from Australia, South Korea, Africa, and more.

The Streetbeefs yard is nicknamed "Satan's Backyard" due to a description a fighter who had been knocked out gave of his experience with the heat, and stress of a "beef match" in the very early days of the organization. Founder Wilmore regularly insists the name has nothing to do with religion (or lack thereof).
