= Danmyé =

Martial art from Martinique

- Also known as: Ladja, Ladjia, Kokoyé, Wonpwen
- Focus: kicks, evasions, takedowns, punches, grappling, acrobatic
- Country of origin: Martinique
- Ancestor arts: Engolo; Senegalese wrestling
- Related arts: Capoeira; Knocking and kicking

The Danmyé or Ladja (also known as Ladjia, Kokoyé, Wonpwen) is a martial art from Martinique that is similar to Brazilian capoeira and to other arts in various Caribbean islands (Guadeloupe, Haiti, Jamaica).

Ladjia is based on the prominent use of kicks and head butts, as well as hand blows. While punches became more common in the late 20th century, earlier periods featured kicks, sweeps and acrobatic defenses.

Danmyé represents martial practice where two players engage in combat within a circle (won) formed by supporters (atlaj) and spectators, regulated by an orchestra (mizik-la). The orchestra typically consists of a drum (tambou), played by two people, accompanied by chants, sometimes improvised, and rhythmic hand claps. This music is directly connected to the Kalenda-Bèlè dances.

One of the characteristics of Danmyé is the use of cunning to deceive the opponent.

== Name ==
While danmyé and ladja are frequently confused nowadays, some authors used them to distinguish between the earlier ritual form dominated by foot fighting and the composite combat-oriented fight that mixed various styles, including the kicks of danmyé.

The term danmyé may well have come to the fight from the drumming technique called danmyé, which serves as a means for drummers to communicate with fighters and guide the ceremonial combat.

== Origins ==
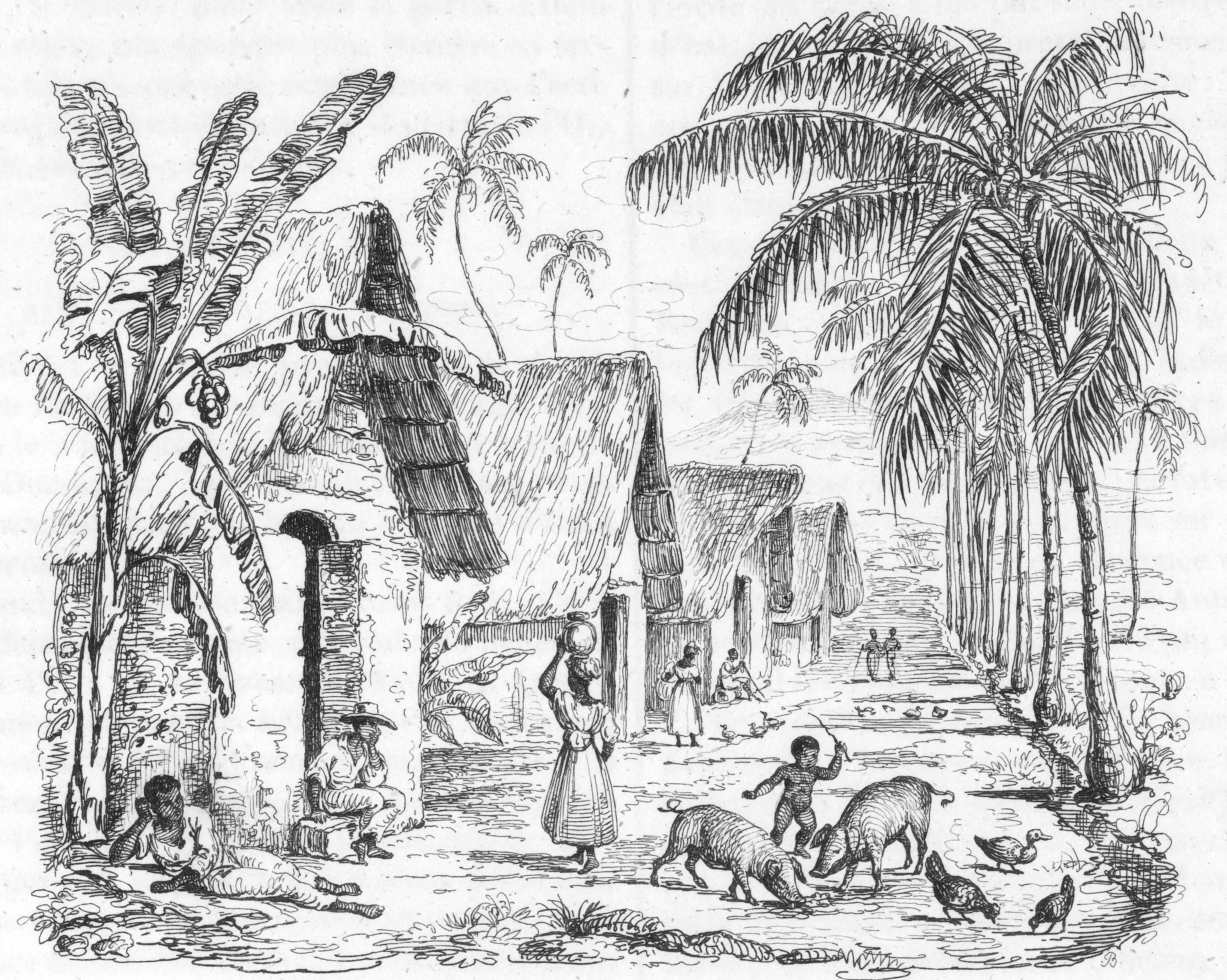
Slave quarters in Martinique

The origins are not entirely clear, although most authors trace them back to Africa and agree that it were brought by slaves. Some authors place their origins in Senegal, while others suggest Benin, or even as a result of syncretism on Gorée. West African wrestlings (Nuba, Senegalese) likely influenced the art.

T.J. Desch-Obi asserts that ladjia was influenced by various combat techniques from West and Central Africa, but he argues that its core techniques align with the Bantu system. He suggests that West African wrestling had a limited role in shaping ladjia until it incorporated other African-derived art forms in the early twentieth century. Desch-Obi distinguishes West African styles as combat sports, while in the Bantu tradition, victory is based on aesthetics without clear winners or losers. He concludes that knocking and kicking, ladjia and capoeira use the most similar techniques within African diaspora, probably derived from Bantu practices such as engolo.

== History ==
Ladja said to be inspired by cockfighting, with stories suggesting that Africans were used as gladiators for entertainment and gambling. In Martinique, planter-organized fights may have featured a more lethal aspect of the martial arts, known as "ladja de la mort" (ladja of death).

From its early history, the martial art functioned not only as a means of slave resistance but also as a method of social control. In order to manage their enslaved workforce, plantation owners enlisted slave overseers who possessed ladja skills. These overseers were referred to as "majò" (meaning "major" in Creole), which eventually evolved into a term of admiration for a proficient fighter. Plantation owners sometimes encouraged their slaves to engage in ladjia competitions that led to severe injuries or, in some cases, deaths.

In the 1930s, Katherine Dunham filmed the ladja matches. At that time, wrestling was not a central component of ladja. The dominant techniques utilized were kicks, many of them inverted, and a significant number of hand strikes from kokoyé.

The practice was strongly repressed during the period of departmentalization (1948), with many municipal regulations prohibiting it. At that time, some fights were real, sometimes leading to personal disputes and even armed clashes.

A new resurgence has occurred in stages since the 1980s. The emphasis is now placed on cultural heritage and the sport dimension.

== Techniques ==
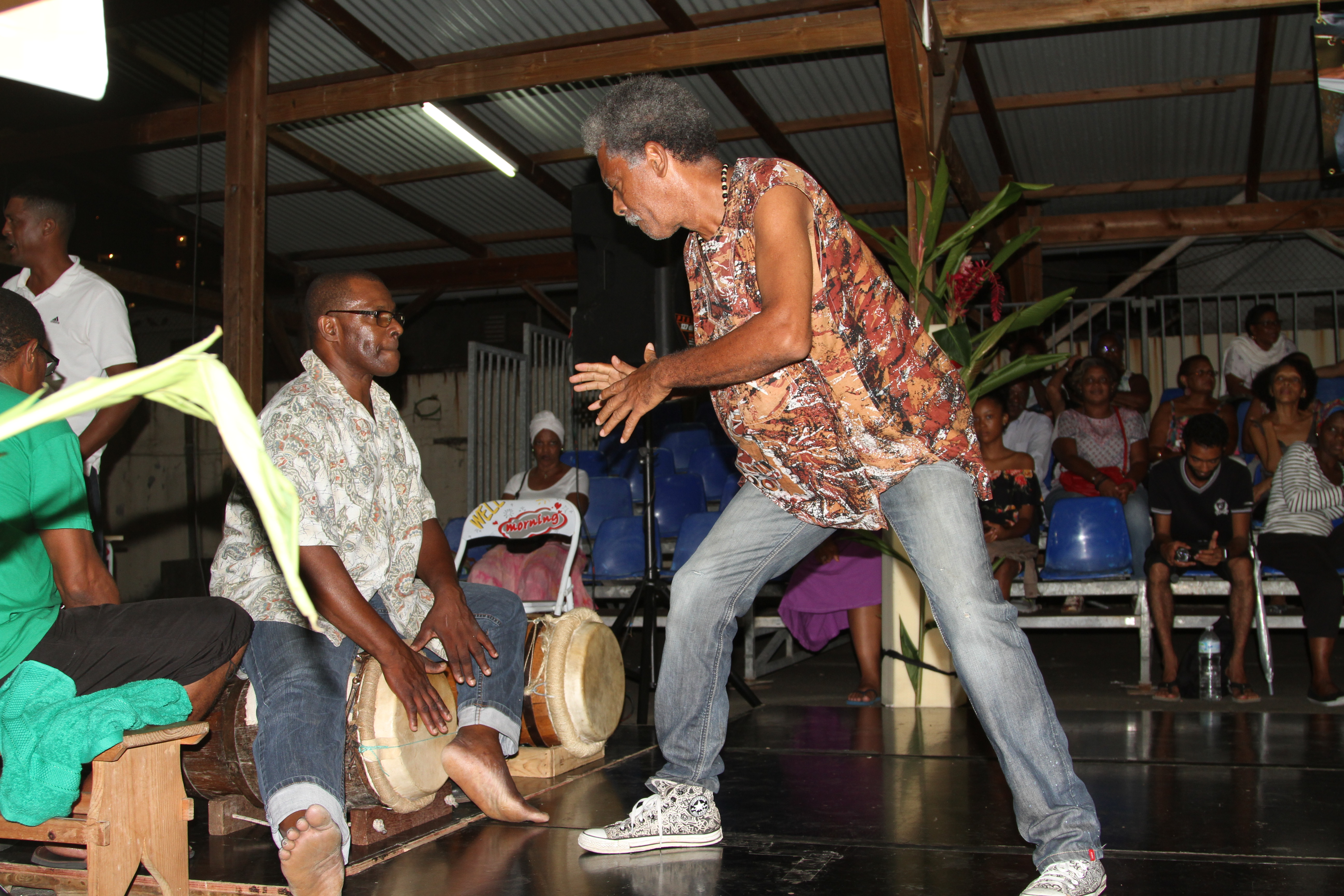
Danmyé, Art Martial Martinique

The fascination of the real [ladja] lies not in the lust of the combat, but in the finesse of approach and retreat; the tension which becomes almost a hypnosis, then the flash of the two bodies as they leap in to the air, fall in a crouch, and whirl at each other in simulated attacks, only to walk nonchalantly away, backs to each other, showing utter indifference before falling again into the rocking motion which rests them physically but excites them emotionally.

— Katherine Dunham

=== Positions ===
There are three combat positions:

- Pozisyon kò doubout: upright posture
- Pozisyon kò ba: low posture
- Pozisyon kò ba atè: very low posture

=== Strategies ===
There are two strategic principles, each with three tactics:

- Alé chèché moun-an: Go seek the opponent. In offense (atak), it's the danmyétè who initiates the combat. The attack can be executed with tactics such as waiting for the opponent to have a weakness before attacking, creating a weakness without contact before attacking, creating a weakness with contact before attacking, or simply entering to attack.
- Atann or Mennen moun-lan vini: Wait for or lure the opponent. In counter-attack (kontatak), the danmyétè reacts to the opponent's attack. Counter-attacks are based on tactics such as leading or waiting for the opponent to attack before counterattacking, leading or waiting for the opponent to attack after their initial attack, or leading or waiting for the opponent to attack simultaneously.

=== Attacks ===
The strikes aim to weaken the opponent, knock them out, or disrupt their combat. Today, the strikes can make contact with the opponent but are not executed with force to avoid injury. In the past, there was a fight among initiates where all strikes were permitted. Strikes are categorized based on the part of the body delivering the strike:

- kou épi lanmen or Kou pwen: punch. Strikes can be delivered with different parts of the hand (do, plat, kan, pwent) and can be closed (tjok) or open (kan, djouk, gojèt). Strikes can be delivered with one hand or both hands simultaneously. There are four main families of punch techniques: défonsé - dépayé - rabat - palaviré ouvè / fèmen.
- kou épi koud: elbow strike.
- kout pié: kick. Kicks can be delivered with different parts of the foot (do, plat, kan, talon). There are nine families of kick techniques: alawonn - balé - défonsé - dématé - dépayé - dékoupé - vach - vanté - rabat.
- kou épi jounou: knee strike.
- wolo, inverted and circular kicks.

Certain strikes are prohibited in competition.

=== Grappling ===
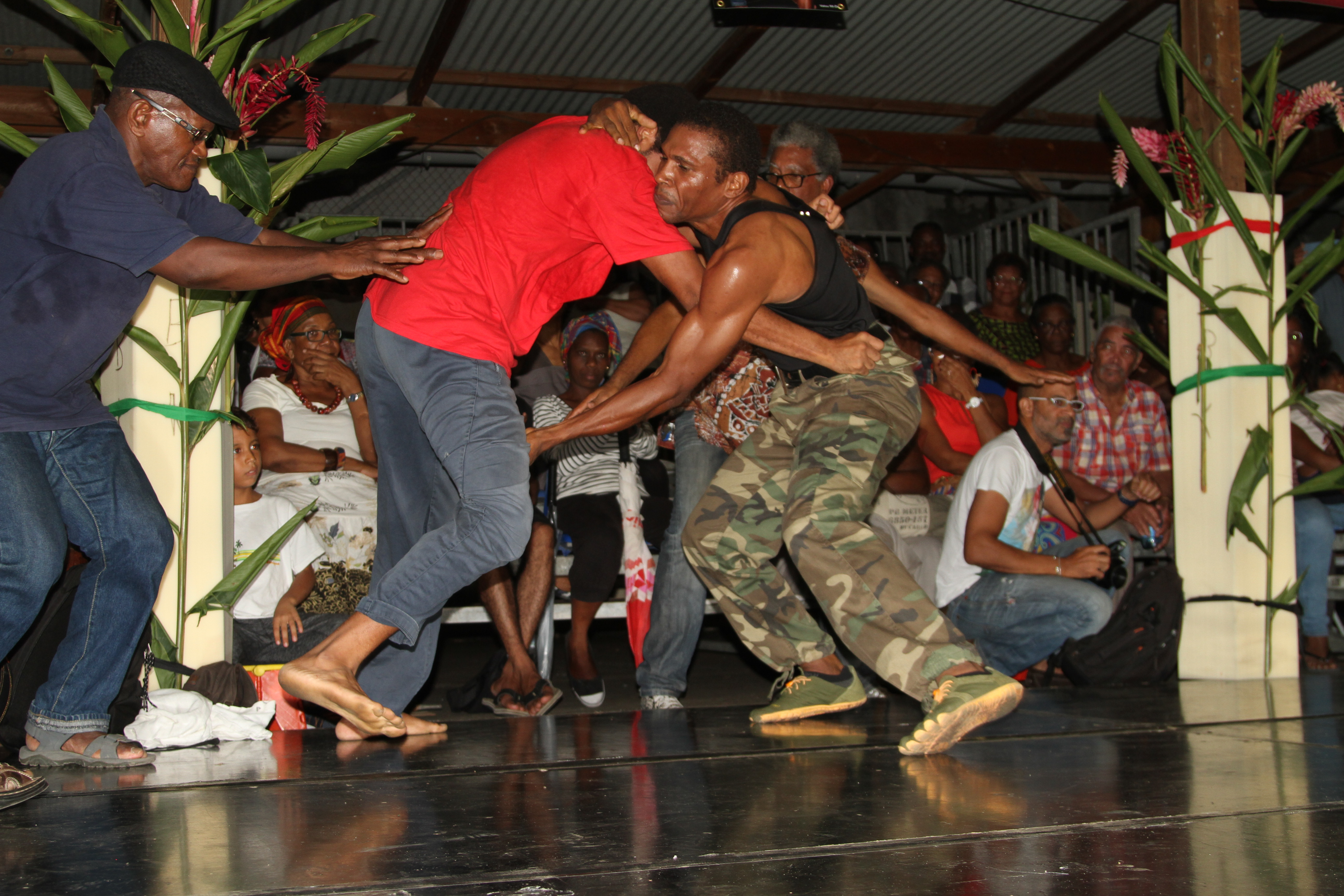
Danmyé, Art Martial Martinique

Various grappling techniques aim to unbalance or throw the opponent. To engage in grappling, at least one grip (tjenbé), one throwing technique, and one immobilization technique are necessary. Two major grappling strategies are distinguished:

- Lité an fòs: grappling with force, where the danmyétè uses their own strength to thwart the opponent.
- Lité an déviyasyon: grappling by deviation, where the danmyétè uses the opponent's strength to throw or unbalance them.

=== Other techniques ===
- Dodging (eskiv) allows evading the opponent's strikes.
- Blocking (blokaj) is used to block the opponent's strikes. Two types of blocking are distinguished: blokaj épi kontak and blokaj san kontak.
- Immobilization (kakan). This includes kakan pijé, kakan kasé, and combinations of both, known as kakan kasé-pijé.

== Similarity to capoeira ==
In 20th century, a Brazilian capoeira mestre noted the resemblance between his art and the ladja he observed:

The Martinique athletes had a very different way of performing negativa, but they did go down defensively; they definitely had a kind of ginga, but less developed. They put their hands on the ground and made full circle kicks like our meia lua de compasso; they made full spin-kicks from behind like our armada de costa, and they had au, the cartwheel.

It is evident that during the 19th century, before the early-20th-century stylization of capoeiragem that altered the art's aesthetics and music, and before the contemporary revival of ladja, the similarities between these styles would have been even more pronounced.

== Literature ==
- Assunção, Matthias Röhrig (2002). Capoeira: The History of an Afro-Brazilian Martial Art. Routledge. ISBN 978-0-7146-8086-6.
- Desch-Obi, M. Thomas J. (2008). Fighting for Honor: The History of African Martial Art Traditions in the Atlantic World. Columbia: University of South Carolina Press. ISBN 978-1-57003-718-4.

== See also ==
- Capoeira
- Engolo
