= Juego de maní =

Stick-fighting martial art and dance

Juego de maní ('game of peanut') often simply called maní or mani, sometimes referred to as baile de maní ('dance of peanut') or bambosa, is a stick-fighting martial art and dance that was developed in Cuba by African slaves. It is still kept alive today in Cuba by folkloric groups. Practitioners are referred to as maniseros.

== Etymology ==
The word mani (or accented maní in Spanish to indicate stress on the final syllable) is said to mean 'war', in an indeterminate African language, and is not a reference to 'peanuts', which the word maní can also refer to in Cuban Spanish. Its longer Spanish names, juego de maní, ('maní game') and baile de maní ('maní dance') would thus mean 'war game' or 'war dance', respectively.

An even longer name recorded is juego de maní con grasa (loosely, 'maní greased game') because of its smooth and slippery qualities.

In English, some modern practitioners call it simply mani, with no accent. The descriptive term mani stick-fighting may also be encountered.

== History ==
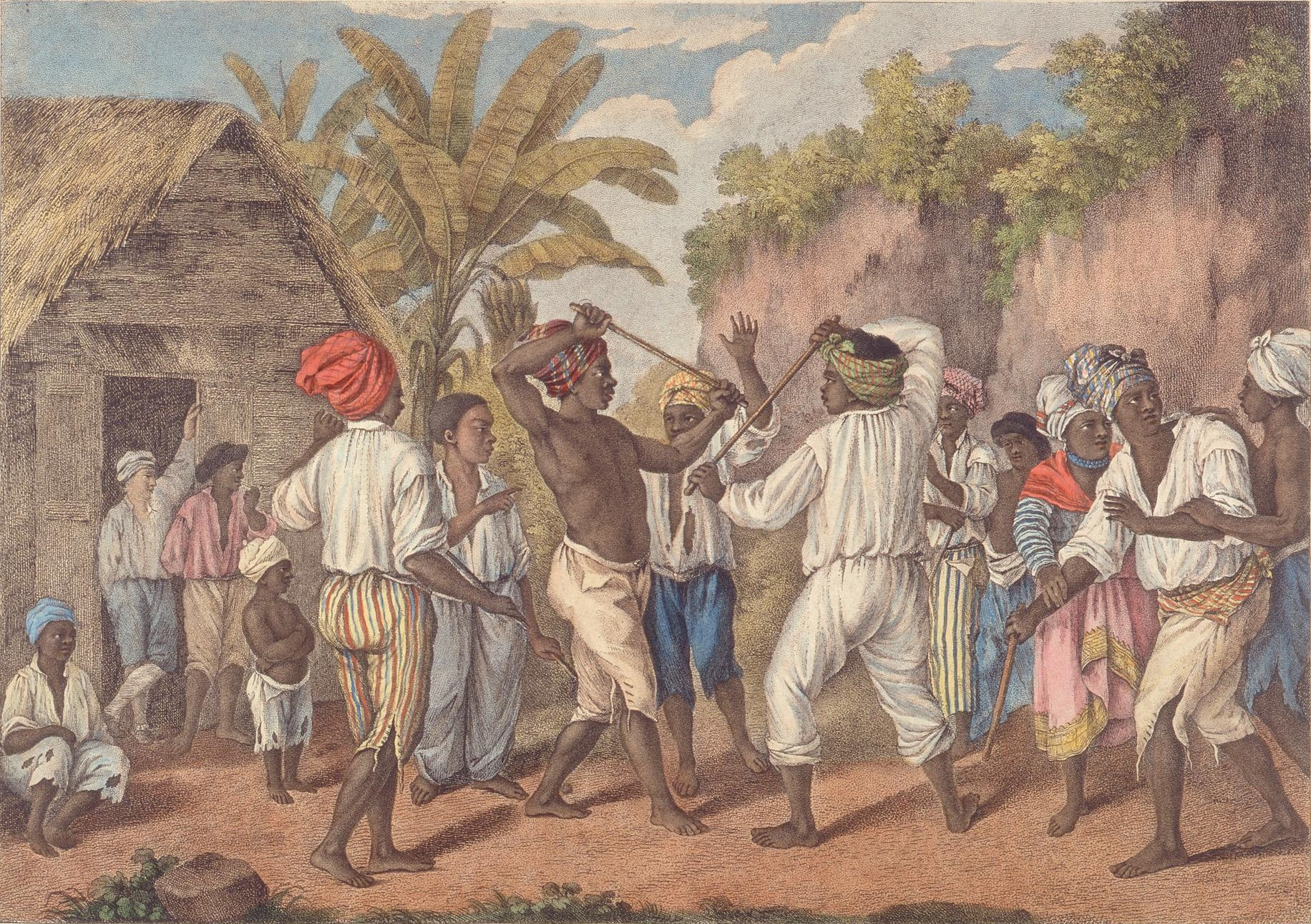
A match between English and French Negroes in the Island of Dominica.

While some argue that the game of Maní likely has West African origins, others contend that its roots likely lie in the Congo, which is evidenced by its close association with Congo musical, dance, and spiritual traditions in Cuba. It was played among African slaves in Cuba, in their scarce free time. Some of their masters would recognize it as fighting competition and gamble on the outcomes. It is thought that sometimes slaves were made to fight to the death for their masters' sport.

The distinct Cuban juego de maní form had emerged clearly by the 19th century on Cuban sugar-cane plantations, by then staffed by free people of mixed Afro-Cuban ancestry. According to Ortiz, the art was popular in Mantanzas and Las Villas.

Originally, Cuban women also danced juego de maní, and this was outlawed in the 1930s, but was still performed.

Today, maní is very folkloric, and those who practice it do so mainly as a pastime or for socializing, because it encompasses so much: music, singing, sparring, friendship, etc.

Related combat traditions exist in Curaçao and Puerto Rico. In the former it was called Kokomakaku, and in the latter it is called Cocobalé (also Kokobalé). However, these are related traditions which should not be confused with Cuba's juego de maní.

== Form, techniques, and music ==
Bouts feature a pair of opponents who follow prescribed dancing and fighting patterns, in a circle. In early colonial Cuba, maní involved a solo dancer who danced within a circle of opponents, who tried to strike blows as he executed various jumps and evasive steps. It later became a one-on-one form.

In some aspects, it is similar to capoeira, and to l'agya (a.k.a. danmyé) from Martinique and Guadeloupe. The footwork is similar in theory to the Brazilian ginga, but is more of a stomping motion.

The combat system of maní encompasses techniques such as low kicks, foot sweeps, punches, head-butts, elbow strikes, forearm strikes, knees, and palm strikes. In also includes the cartwheel as an evasive technique. Each fight ends in a sweep, take down or grappling maneuver.

Maní may also use weapons such as a cane staff (used similarly to those of calinda-style stick-fighting in Trinidad and other Caribbean locales), as well as knives, including the machete and double machete. The original martial art form of juego de maní risked particular danger, because the dancer/fighter sometimes wore leather wrist covers, muñequeras, that were adorned with nails and other sorts of metal.

The rhythm of the dance/fight is based on the rhythm that is played by the musicians, and accompanying musicians are expected to synchronize drumming accents with movement accents in the performance. This form was popular in Matanzas and Las Villas provinces and featured circling, competitive male dancing, which influenced non-combative, social dances that were created in Cuba, such as rumba Columbia.

The music utilized in juego de maní is that of Palo Monte, or simply Palo, an Afro-Cuban religion. One of the most popular maní songs is "Vamos a la guerra si maní" ('We go to war if [there is] maní').

== Maniseros ==
Skilled practitioners are called maniseros. A grandmaster of the art who taught in Cuba was Juan de Dios Ramos Morejón, the founder-director of Cuban folkloric dance company Raices Profundas ('Deep Roots'). De Dios grew up fighting in the streets of Cuba and he has been called a "living encyclopedia" of the art, when he chooses to teach it. He was an ambassador of Afro-Cuban music and martial arts for many years, having traveled to teach in places as diverse as Germany, Japan, the United States, and Mexico. His Puerto Rican, New Yorker protégé Miguel Quijano (a current mani teacher and instructional author) notes De Dios as also a santero, and a ceremonial singer "versed in Yoruba, Palo, Abakua, and Arara traditions, known throughout Cuba".

De Dios was in turn a student, with seven others, of the great manisero Argeliers Leon. Quijano writes of the eight graduates of Leon that they "knew the art ... in its entirety", as both a dance form and a martial art, and were founding members of the Conjunto Folklorico Nacional (Cuba's 'National Folkloric Connection' dance organization), where they taught "a folkloric version", i.e. one oriented to dance performance.

It is through these folklorical groups that Palo and maní are kept alive. Although a few masters still exist in Cuba, not many truly understand the fighting aspects of the art over the folkloric dance version. According to Quijano, who has studied under several of them, the only living master maniseros are Juan de Dios, Carlos Aldama, and Rogelio Martinez Fure (he also counts Cuban journalist Alberto Pedro, but as a retired practitioner).

== Literature ==
- Moore, Robin D., ed. 2018. Ortiz, Fernando on Music: Selected Writings on Afro-Cuban Culture. Philadelphia, PA: Temple University Press.
- Quijano, Miguel. 2024. Sons of War: Cocobale & Mani. Self-published.
- Quijano, Miguel, and Miguel Machado. 2023. "El Juego de Maní & Cocobalé: A Brief History of the Afro-Caribbean Dances of War." In The Book of the Stick, edited by Mahipal Lunia, Juha A. Vuori and Mika Harju-Seppänen, 52-71. Immersion Foundation.
