= Bajan stick-licking =

Style of martial arts practiced in Barbados

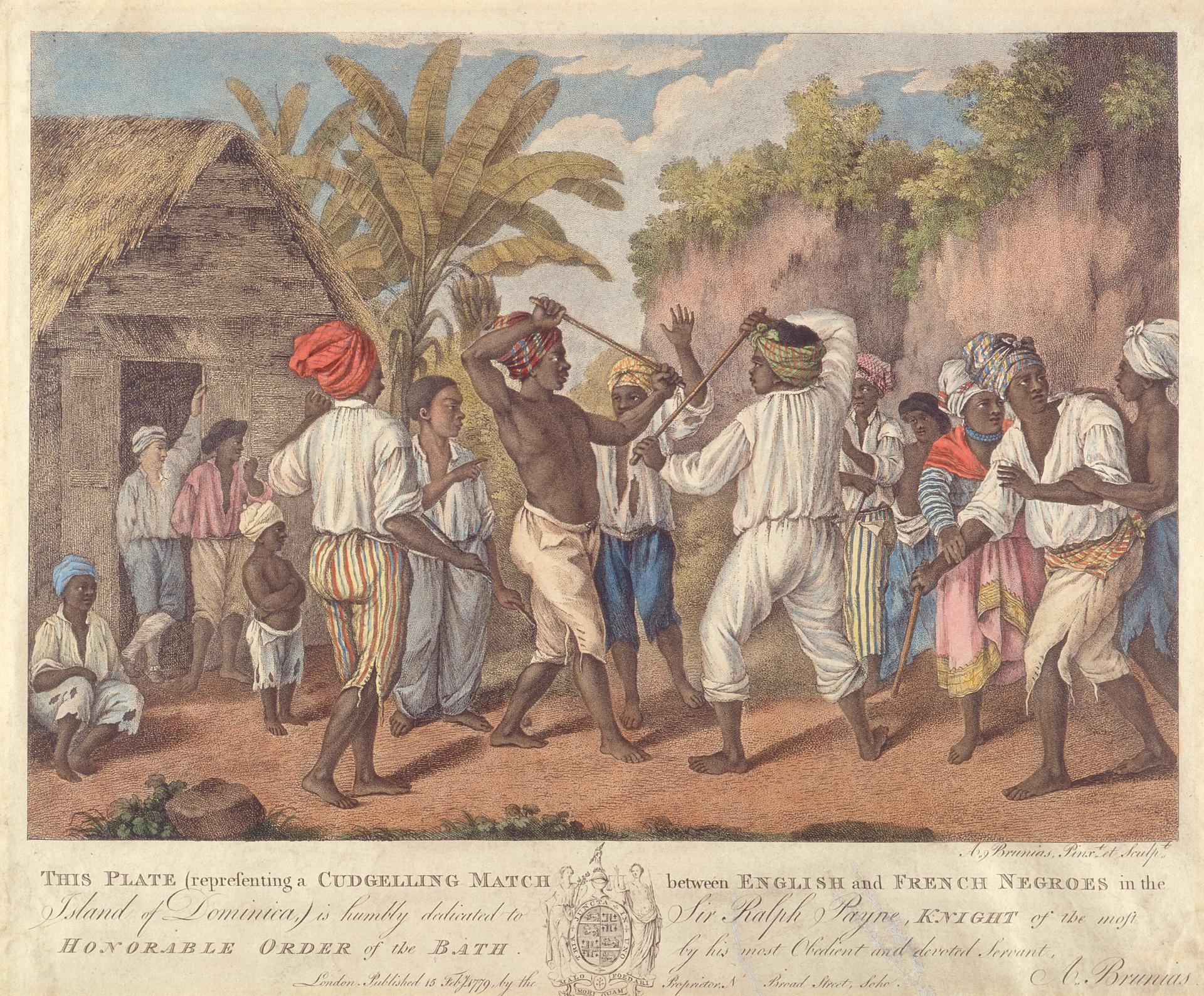
A Cudgelling Match between English and French Negroes in the Island of Dominica, 1779, by Agostino Brunias

Bajan sticklicking (often spelled stick-licking) is the traditional form of stick fighting in Barbados. It is a stick fighting martial art that has its roots from Africa, where two participants used fire-hardened wooden sticks, varying in length as weapons and carrying out fighting techniques. This art most likely came to Barbados during the 16th century through the Trans-Atlantic Slave Trade.

The earliest reference to stick fighting in the Caribbean was from a lithograph completed on the island of Dominica in 1779 by an Italian artist, Agostino Brunias. In the image, there are two persons in the middle and other stick fighters and watchers gathered around them; some who are willing to fight and others that are old and experienced observing and refereeing the fight.

Stickfighting started to spread across the region with each culture having its own name. In Guadeloupe, its name was mayolé, while in Haiti and Trinidad, there were similar names, kalinda and kalenda respectively (Guyana – Setu; Carricou – Bois) and finally, the discussed art form Bajan Stick Licking.

During the African Diaspora, many Africans brought their cultures, traditions and even their own style of combat with them to the archipelago. As one can see from above, Africa was filled with many different forms of stickfighting and knowing that before their long transatlantic journey they were separated, one can deduce that after their arrival in Barbados, there was an evolution of each individual art form. Although made less likely due to the lack of connectivity and interbreeding, Stick Licking in Barbados probably also had influences from English, Irish and Indian influences, given that these countries also have old stickfighting traditions. However, Africans have a longer history of stick fighting than these countries do, so it’s more likely that they influence the others.

Sticklicking is actively practiced in Barbados and is currently being taught with formal grading by the DBSS Sticklicking and Martial Arts Schools.
