= Calinda =

Martial art, folk music and war dance originating among people of African descent

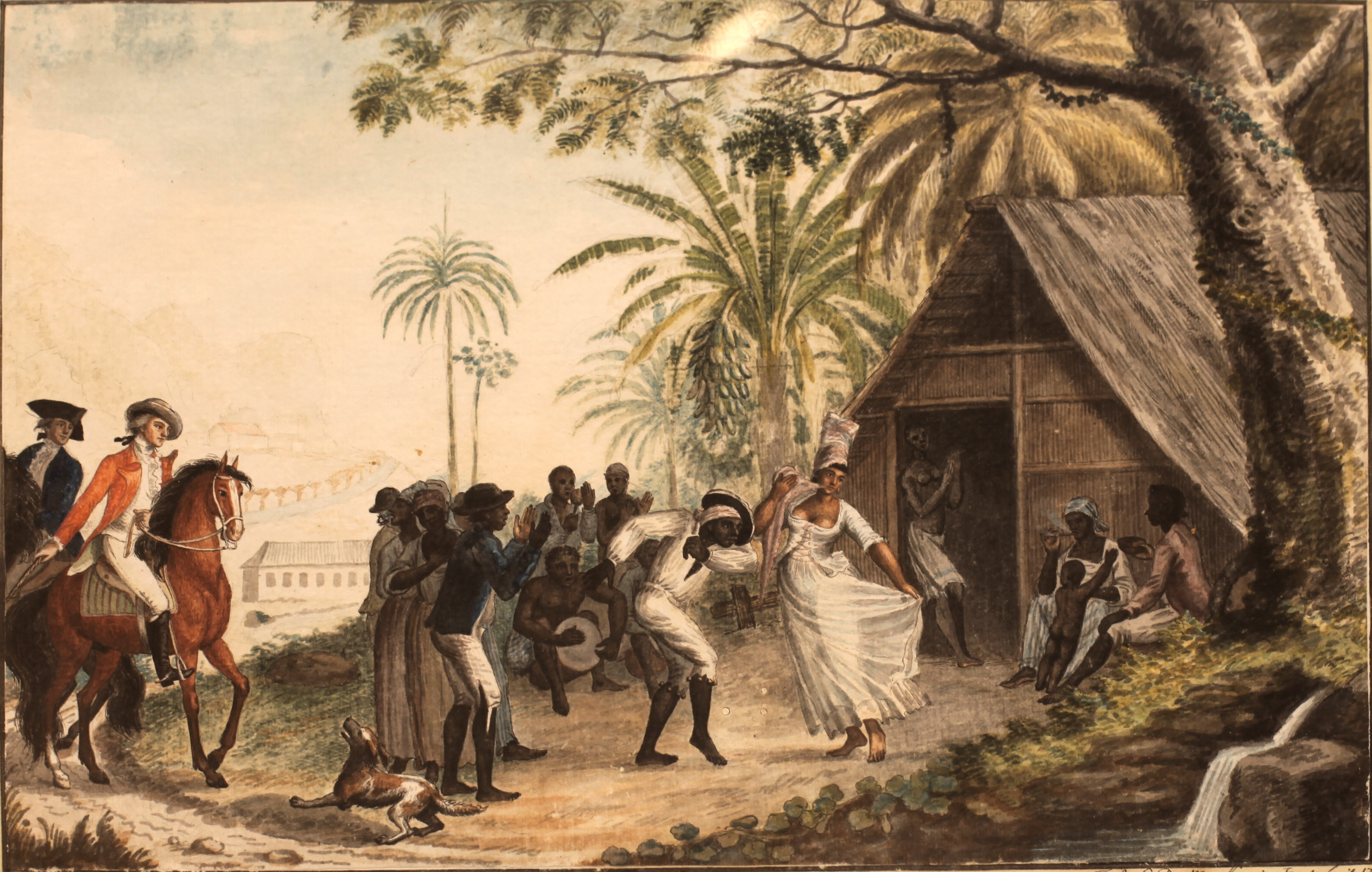
- Calinda, dance of the Negroes in America, 1783, watercolour by François Aimé Louis Dumoulin
- Also known as: Kalinda, kalenda
- Focus: Stick Fighting
- Country of origin: Trinidad and Tobago
- Parenthood: Old Kalenda

Calinda (also spelled kalinda or kalenda) is a martial art, as well as a kind of folk music and war dance in the Caribbean that arose in the 1720s. It was brought to the Caribbean by Africans in the transatlantic slave trade and is based on native African combat dances.

== History ==
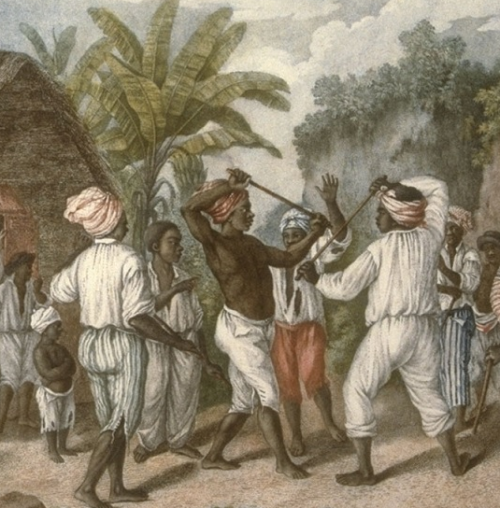
Caribbean stick fight

Calinda is a kind of stick-fighting commonly seen practiced during Trinidad and Tobago Carnival. It is the national martial art of Trinidad and Tobago. French planters with their slaves, free coloureds and mulattos from neighboring islands of Grenada, Guadeloupe, Martinique and Dominica migrated to Trinidad during the Cedula of Population in 1783.

Carnival had arrived with the French, and slaves who could not participate formed a parallel celebration (which eventually became known as Canboulay between 1858 and 1884). After the Emancipation of Slavery in 1833, a lead vocalist or chantwell (chantuelle) would sing call-and-response chants called lavways lionising and cheering on the stickfighters. There, Carnival songs are considered to be derived from calinda chants and "lavways". This form of music gradually evolved into the modern calypso.

Before the Emancipation from slavery and its integration into Carnival, Calinda was used as a type of performance to provide ways of entertainment for slaves. Once the French came to Trinidad, stick fighters were no longer known as stick men but as boismen (bois meaning stick in French). There were different factors involved in stick fighting, including a costume that the performers would have to wear and the gayelles (or arenas) they would fight in. There are also special rituals that are done in the gayelle before the fight starts that include different ceremonial songs.

Though it is more commonly practiced as a dance because of the violent outcome of stick-fighting, its roots are still that of a martial art originating from Kingdom of Kongo, and stick-fights still occur in Trinidad. They also have been formalised into annual Carnival competitions.

The origin of this tradition has also been related to Afro-Iberian brotherhoods and the calends.

== Elsewhere in the Caribbean ==
It is practiced in other parts of the Caribbean, such as Martinique. or Guadeloupe (under various names such as l'agya, damaye and mayolé).

Kalenda is a warrior style of dance, a form of Tire machèt, which is an Afro-Caribbean martial art practiced in Haiti. Its origins stem from the Congo, and it came to the United States through the port city of New Orleans.

Similar forms of this martial art exist elsewhere in the Caribbean. For example, in Barbados it is commonly referred to as "stick-licking" or "stick science." In Puerto Rico it’s called Kokobalé and it is performed with Bomba (Puerto Rico) music.

== In Louisiana ==
The well-known Cajun song "Allons danser Colinda" is about a Cajun boy asking a girl named Colinda to do a risqué dance with him; probably derived from the Calinda dance which was reported to have been performed in New Orleans by Afro-Caribbean slaves brought to Louisiana.

Dancing the "Calinda" is also referred to in one of Louisiana writer Kate Chopin's most famous stories from Bayou Folk (1894), "La Belle Zoraïde", which stresses the strong Afro-Caribbean presence in Louisiana.

== See also ==
- Juego de maní
- Capoeira
- Bajan stick-licking
- Bamboula
