= List of stick sports =

Sports that use stick devices

Stick sports are games in which a long stick-like device is essential to the sport. Often the stick is used to strike or catch a ball, puck or ring, but may be used for other purposes such as dislodging your opponent in jousting, a weapon in stick fighting or a prop in quidditch. Sticks are specialized for each sport, but may fall into broad categories such as bats, clubs, cues or mallets.

== Sports that use a stick for scoring goals ==
- Hockey
  - Ball hockey
  - Bandy
  - Broomball
  - Field hockey
  - Hockeys
  - Ice hockey
  - Indoor hockey
  - Inline hockey
  - Ringette
  - Roller hockey
  - Sledge hockey
  - Street Hockey
  - Underwater hockey
  - Floorball
  - Spongee
- Hurling/Camogie
- Shinty
- Cammag
- Lacrosse
  - Indigenous North American stickball
- Polo
  - Auto polo
  - Canoe polo
  - Chovgan
  - Dakyu
  - Cowboy polo
  - Cycle polo
  - Elephant polo
  - Hobby horse polo
  - Polocrosse
  - Segway polo
  - Yak polo

== Cue sports ==
- Bar billiards
- Boccette
- Bumper pool
- Carom billiards
- Danish pin billiards
- English billiards
- Kaisa
- Novuss
- Pool
- Russian pyramid
- Slosh
- Snooker

== Bat-and-ball games ==
- Baseball
- British baseball
- Cricket
- Danish longball
- Lapta
- Oină
- Pesäpallo
- Rounders
- Schlagball

== Martial arts ==
- Jereed
- Jousting
  - Namur stilt jousting
  - Quintain
  - Running at the ring
  - Sinjska alka
  - Slovene quintain
  - Tent pegging
  - Water jousting
- Stick-fighting
  - Angampora
  - Banshay
  - Bataireacht
  - Bōjutsu
  - Canne de combat
  - Gatka
  - Jogo do pau
  - Juego del palo
  - Jūkendō
  - Jōdō
  - Kalaripayattu
  - Kendo
  - Krabi–krabong
  - Nguni stick-fighting
  - Silambam
  - Singlestick
  - Tahtib

== Other sports ==
- Golf
- Ground billiards
  - Croquet
  - Gateball
  - Pall-mall
  - Roque
  - Trucco
  - Woodball
- Jeu de mail
- Quadball

== See also ==
- Basque pelota
- List of racket sports
- Swordsmanship
