= Luti people =

Subculture in Iran

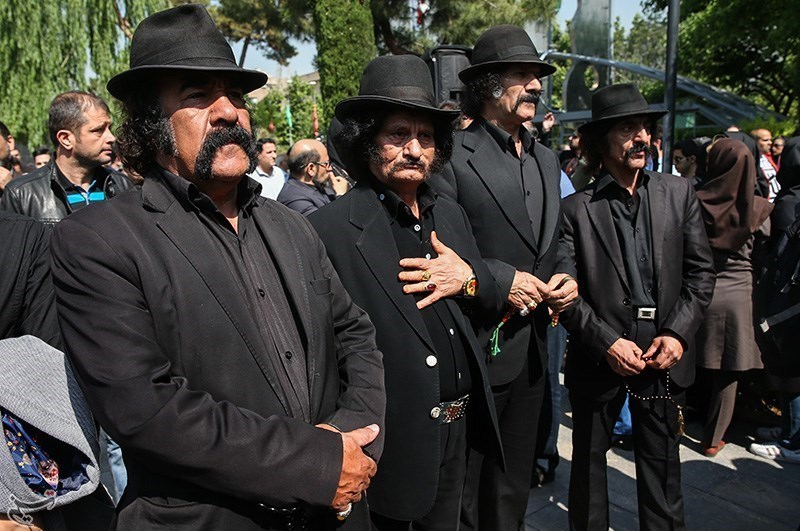
Luti men at the funeral of Naser Cheshmazar in Tehran, 2018

Luti (Persian: لوطی) was a term used in Qajar Iran and earlier to describe a social group of men who shared certain traits in their appearance and conduct. These included adherence to certain moral values, such as chivalry and trustworthiness, while remaining indifferent to some other moral norms. Lutis often frequented zurkhanehs, and some made a living through singing, dancing, or putting on entertainments involving monkeys or other animals. Lutis held a low social status and were even regarded by some as troublemakers or ruffians. In some contexts, the word luti also carried homosexual connotations.

== Description ==
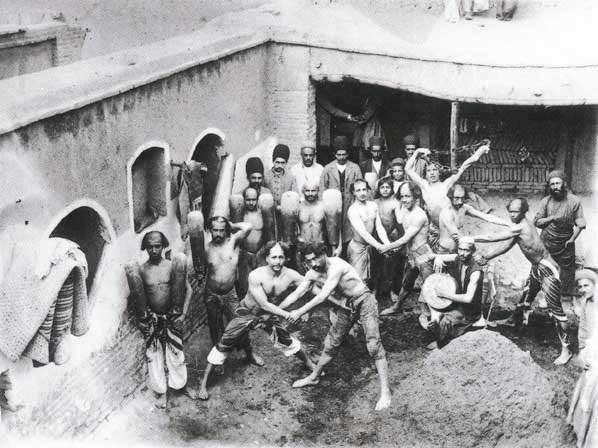
A picture of lutis in wrestling attire

The term luti has had several different meanings. During the Qajar period, luti referred to a group of wrestlers and bodybuilders who frequented the zurkhaneh. The outward marks of the lutis included the Yazdi handkerchief and a chain. Many of these lutis worked as small-scale merchants and tradesmen in the bazaar, while some were employed in occupations such as night watchmen, guarding the city walls, and organizing Muharram ceremonies. Upon joining a group of lutis, they swore to live according to the ethics of javanmardi (Persian: جوانمردی), to defend the weak against bullies, to protect their neighborhood from outside threats, and to refrain from taking up occupations regarded as base or dishonorable. While exercising in the zurkhaneh, even in Turkic-speaking cities such as Tabriz, they recited verses from the Shahnameh, and some were affiliated with Sufi factions such as the Heydari and Ne'mati orders.

The term luti was used in contrast to penti (Persian: پِنتی), meaning a man without gheyrat and lacking the qualities associated with luti conduct. Some people regarded the lutis as pahlavans and popular heroes, while others viewed them as troublemakers or thugs. Lutis were generally expected to observe sexual propriety, to be trustworthy, and to adhere to certain religious customs, although they could be indifferent toward prevailing social norms and conventional moral standards. Drinking alcohol and gambling, both of which were condemned by religious law and social custom in Iranian society, were common and accepted among the lutis. Lutis also played a role in the ceremonies of Muharram and Safar, helping to establish takyeh, carrying alams, and stirring enthusiasm among groups performing sineh-zani rituals. Some lutis were also employed by members of the clergy and were tasked with collecting religious taxes such as khums and zakat.

Depiction of lutis in 1971 Iranian drama film Dash Akol, about the life of a prominent luti from Shiraz

The lutis had an internal hierarchy. A newcomer received the title dash, an abbreviation of dadash (“brother”). Over time, lutis could rise to higher ranks such as "Dash Mashdi" and "Choghaleh Mashdi". The highest rank among the lutis was known as "Babashamal", and usually each neighborhood had only one Babashamal. To advance to the higher ranks, lutis had to perform acts such as carrying an alam or reciting mourning chants, or accomplish some remarkable feat beyond the ability of an ordinary person, for example, consuming a bowl of cardamom and rosewater without leaving any sediment at the bottom, swimming twenty or thirty continuous laps around a garmabeh pool, or eating ten full servings of chelow kebab.

Lutis took part in many riots and violent disturbances and were often at the forefront of confrontations with government forces. For example, during the Qajar period, under the reigns of Fath-Ali Shah, Mohammad Shah, and Naser al-Din Shah, lutis played a prominent role in resistance during royal military expeditions against Isfahan, to such an extent that the harshest punishments and tortures were often inflicted upon luti leaders. Moreover, because the government often failed to provide adequately for the welfare of the population, popular uprisings served as one means by which the public could impose its will upon those in power, since the government feared the political and economic costs caused by disorder. Lutis likewise played a key role in these uprisings. During such disturbances, they looted the property of the wealthy and afterward distributed it among the poor. In the cities of Qajar Iran, where neighborhoods could broadly be divided into wealthy and poor districts, luti organization and activity remained especially strong in poorer neighborhoods.

Lutis also had a distinctive manner of speaking, including characteristic insults and expressions of their own. For example, instead of ordinary terms meaning “ungallant” or “ill-behaved,” they used forms such as lamorovvat (Persian: لامروت) and lakerdar (Persian: لاکردار).

== Origin ==
Miniature painting of a darvish (right)

The word luti derives from the name of the people of Lot. Both luti and lati meant a pederast or one who pursued boys, and the word continued to be used in this sense until the late 13th century SH (late 19th/early 20th century CE). In more recent times, however, the word has more often been used to mean a fearless and socially unconstrained person. The term luti was first used by Kasa'i, a poet of the fourth Islamic century, who equated lutis with “beardless boys.” Rumi and Obeyd Zakani regarded lutis as shahid-baz, and the word lavati (Persian: لواطی) is still used with the same sexual meaning. Nasir Khusraw likewise mentions lutis alongside wine-drinkers, thieves, and procurers. Not all texts, however, associate the term with negative sexual meanings. Suzani, for example, warned that lutis could not be trusted in commercial dealings. In Hindi, the word banka carries a similar sense and refers to people who are socially unconventional but fearless.

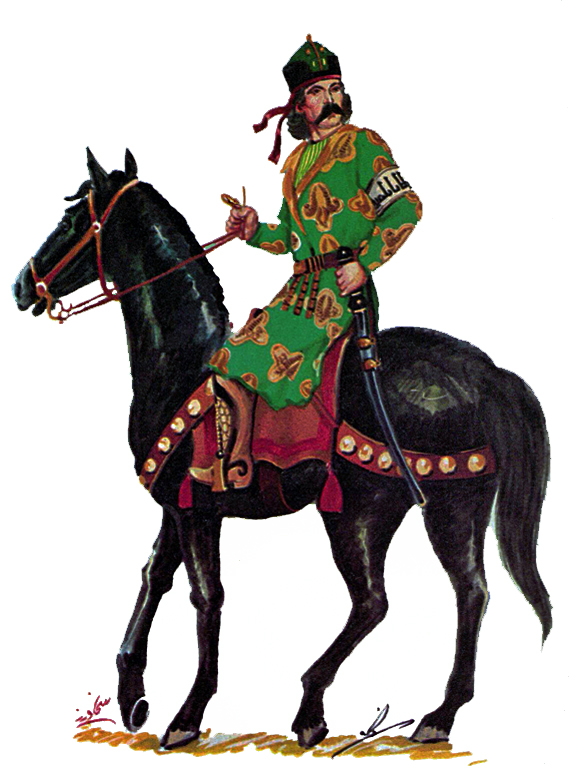
Depiction of an Ayyar from the Saffarid period

The modern expressions luti-bazar or luti-bazi, meaning cheating or trickery, especially in financial matters, and luti kardan, meaning to squander or spend wastefully, derive from this usage. In the sixteenth century CE, corresponding to the Safavid period, and probably much earlier, the term was used for groups described as "qalandaran-e bi-sar-o-pa" and "lutiyan-e qalandar-nama-ye bangiyana", that is, impoverished dervishes and pseudo-dervish entertainers who used intoxicating drugs. Luti was also applied to court jesters and itinerant entertainers, including tightrope walkers, dancers, and clowns who performed improvised comedy, as well as those who traveled with animals, usually monkeys, bears, or goats, that danced to music. In the nineteenth century, the term was used for Robin Hood-like bandits who, in the tradition of the ayyars, challenged oppressive rulers. Despite their antisocial side, lutis were also known for luti-gari, or javanmardi, that is, gallantry and chivalrous conduct. For this reason, expressions such as "luti-khoda'i" and "luti-allahi" were used, both implying that their activities were connected with divine justice.

The phenomenon of luti-gari was probably a degenerated form of the organizations of the people of futuwwa and the ayyars. The ayyari tradition may have roots in the Parthian period. After the collapse of the Sasanian Empire and the coming of Islam to Iran, the ayyars organized themselves into social groups and resisted the oppression of autocratic rulers who imposed heavy taxes on the population. Their activities in Khorasan, Sistan, and Iraq contributed to the rise of the Saffarid dynasty. The qualities traditionally associated with futuwwa and the ayyars, such as javanmardi, care for the elderly, generosity, loyalty, and hospitality toward strangers, were the same traits that later appeared among the lutis. By the Safavid period, however, the people of futuwwa had gradually undergone moral decline, and during the Safavid era they were increasingly replaced by lutis and mashdis.

== Attire ==
The typical attire of lutis during the Pahlavi period consisted of a kolah-e Shapo, a curled moustache, and a black suit. Earlier, however, during the Qajar period, luti clothing and accessories included the following: a Kashani silk handkerchief, a chibouk with a cherrywood or jujube-wood stem, a sash tied around the waist that held a Kermani brass cup, giveh shoes, a Yazdi chain, and an Isfahani qameh dagger.

Example of Luti clothing

== Music ==
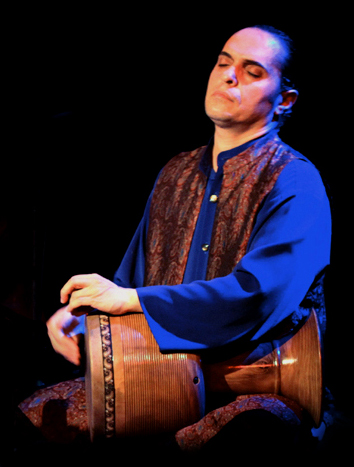
A Tombak player

Sasan Fatemi has described the role of the lutis in music in an article. Through his study of historical sources, he showed that the term luti was applied to itinerant musician-dancers who performed with animals. Although this usage of the term was especially common during the 1320s and 1330s SH (1940s and 1950s CE), its roots extend back more than a century earlier. Even during the reign of Naser al-Din Shah, sources mention lutis who kept monkeys and even lions and performed accompanied by the tombak. Lutis combined music with entertainment and, alongside dancing, instrumental music, singing, and animal performances, engaged in other acts such as vocal imitation, pantomime, and comic dances. Not all lutis were musicians. Dash-Mashdis and toughs who possessed the traits associated with lutis were likewise called luti, and only those among them who had good voices and musical talent took up musical performance.

Image of a Tar instrument

In rural areas, lutis performed a form of instrumental music in which the sorna was played together with the naqqareh or dohol. In musical terms, lutis occupied a low social position, and the contempt directed toward them resulted not only from their social standing but also from the type of music they performed. In Iranian society at the time, instrumental music was regarded with disapproval on religious grounds, whereas vocal music enjoyed greater acceptance. Because lutis performed instrumental music professionally and in exchange for payment, they were condemned for this as well. Lutis also sometimes accompanied their music with dancing and acrobatic feats, which were likewise regarded as improper in an Iranian society generally hostile toward dancing. Traces of these lutis can even be found in the Caucasus, where they were known as loto and sang at wedding ceremonies while playing the dayereh.

In urban areas, lutis, who held a lower social status than motrebs, wandered through the streets in groups of two or three, seeking out households in which a birth or circumcision celebration had recently taken place. They would play the tombak and sing for the household and then leave after receiving a small sum of money or some fruit and sweets. Some of these lutis also brought monkeys with them and made the animals dance and perform, while some groups included a musician who played the kamancheh or tar.

Many of the verses performed by lutis had nonsensical content and lacked a melody, being delivered more like spoken recitation. They had cheerful, childlike rhythms. Their lyrics generally lacked much coherence and were often assembled from several unrelated fragments that shared no common meaning.

== See also ==
- Javānmardi

== Bibliography ==
- Amanolahi, Sekandar; Norbeck, Edward (1975), The Luti, an outcaste group of Iran (PDF), vol. 61/2, Rice University, archived from the original (PDF) on 2024-01-13
