= Stick-fighting =

Type of martial arts using wooden sticks

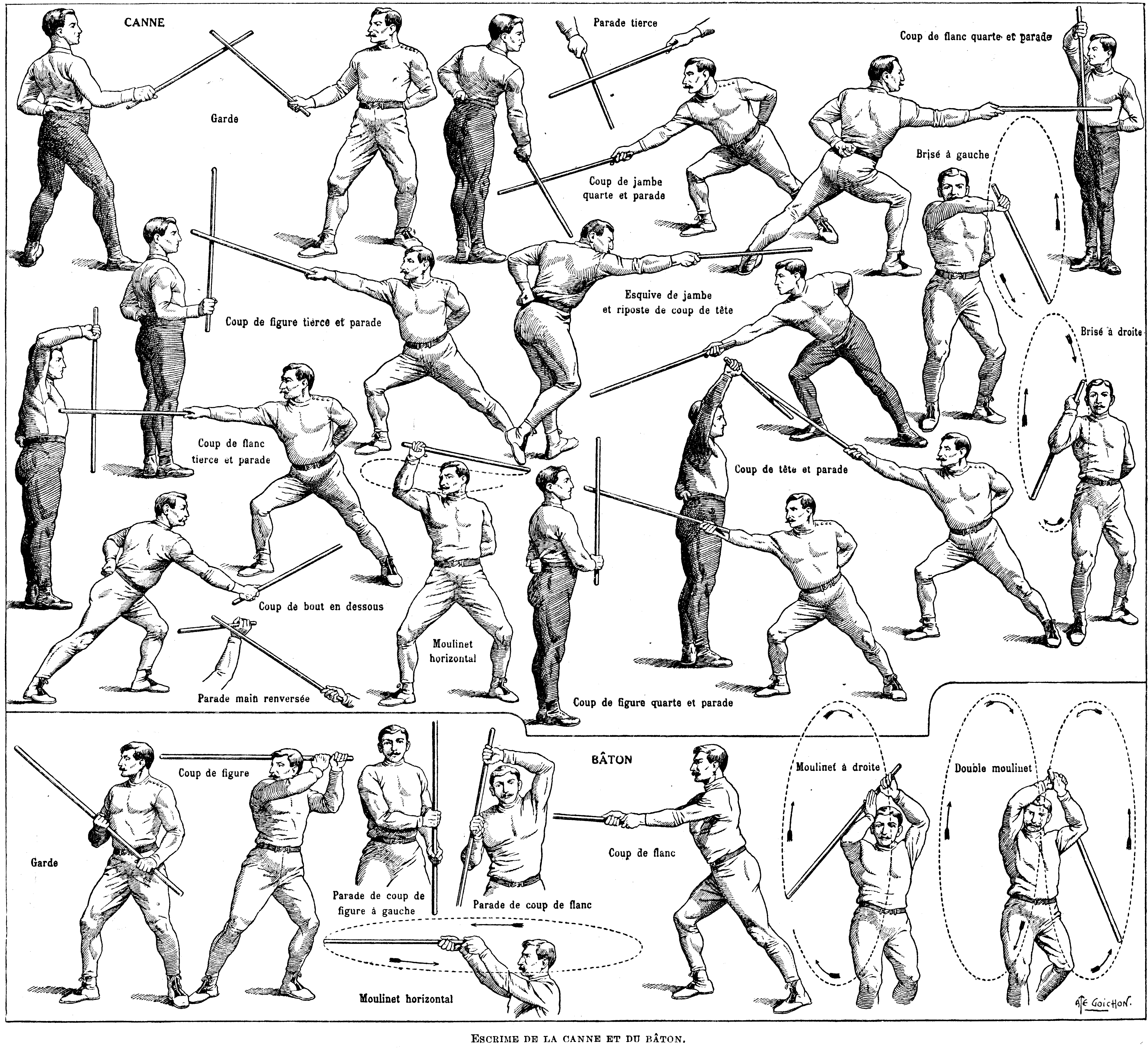
Cane and stick fencing in French encyclopedia.

Stick-fighting, stickfighting, or stick fighting, is a variety of martial arts which use blunt, hand-held "sticks" for fighting, most typically a simple, non-lethal, wooden staff or baton. Schools of stick-fighting exist for a variety of weapons, including gun staffs, bō, jō, bastons, Naboot, and arnis sticks, among others. Cane-fighting is the use of walking sticks as improvised weapons. Some techniques can also be used with a sturdy umbrella or even with a sword or dagger still in its scabbard.

Thicker and/or heavier blunt weapons such as clubs or the mace are outside the scope of stick-fighting (since they cannot be wielded with the necessary precision, relying on the sheer force of impact for stopping power instead), as are more distinctly-shaped weapons such as the taiaha used by the Māori people of New Zealand, and the macuahuitl used by the Aztec people of Mesoamerica in warfare.

Although many systems are defensive combat techniques intended for use if attacked while lightly armed, others such as kendo, arnis, and gatka were developed as safe training methods for dangerous weapons. Whatever their history, many stick-fighting techniques lend themselves to being treated as sports.

In addition to systems specifically devoted to stick-fighting, certain other disciplines include it, either in its own right, as in the Tamil martial art silambam, or merely as part of a polyvalent training including other weapons and/or bare handed fighting, as in Kerala's kalaripayattu tradition, where these wooden weapons serve as preliminary training before practice of the more dangerous metal weapons.

== Styles ==
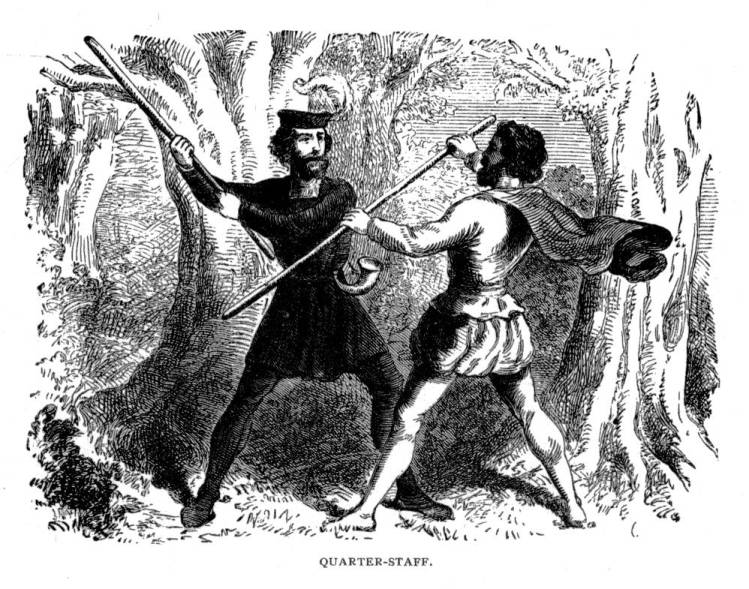
An artwork depicting stick fighting

=== Europe and the United States ===
Traditional European systems of stick-fighting included a wide variety of methods of quarterstaff combat, which were detailed in numerous manuscripts written by masters-at-arms. Many of these methods became extinct but others adapted and survived as folk-sports and self-defence systems. Examples include France's canne de combat or la canne, England's single stick, Portugal's jogo do pau, Poland's palcat, the juego del palo of the Canary Islands, Ireland's shillelagh, Italy's scherma di bastone. Giuseppe Cerri's 1854 manual Trattato teorico e pratico della scherma di bastone is influenced by masters of the Italian school of swordsmanship, Achille Marozzo and perhaps Francesco Alfieri.

Walking sticks feature heavily in non-lethal self-defense from the beginning of the modern era onward, being a hardy and lightweight stick-fighting option the user is already expected to carry around on a daily basis. A stick is preferable to unarmed combat for all but the most skilled civilians, and the techniques necessary for cane-fighting can frequently carry over wholesale from one's experience with European schools of sword fencing.

The period of 1604 to 1904 can be considered the heyday of cane-fighting in Britain, stretching from the recognition of self defense in English law through to the publishing of the first work on jujitsu, marking a paradigm shift toward hand-to-hand techniques. In addition to the practicality of defending oneself in cramped, urban conditions, the walking stick's wide fashionability in the 19th century also established stick-fighting as the gentleman's choice of martial art. Derivative inventions like the swordstick attempted to capitalize on this, but could be seen as a cowardly concealment of one's true weapon while simultaneously compromising the existing non-lethal uses of the cane.

The French system of la canne ("the cane") was developed to meet similar non-lethal needs, and is still practiced as a competitive sport. A self-defense adaptation of la canne developed by Swiss master-at-arms Pierre Vigny in the early 1900s has been revived as part of the curriculum of contemporary bartitsu.

Singlestick was developed as a method of training in the use of backswords such as the cavalry sabre and naval cutlass. It was a popular pastime in the UK from the 18th to the early 20th century, and was a fencing event at the 1904 Summer Olympics. Although interest in the art declined, a few fencing coaches continued to train with the stick and competitions in this style of stick-fighting were reintroduced into the Royal Navy in the 1980s by commander Locker Madden. The art continues to gain a small following amongst the martial art community in the UK, Australia, Canada and the US.

In the US during the early years of the 1900s, fencer and self-defense specialist A. C. Cunningham developed a unique system of stick-fighting using a walking stick or umbrella, which he recorded in his book The Cane as a Weapon.

Extreme cases of the art include the 1844 attack on Carthage Jail, Illinois, where Mormon prisoners John Taylor and Willard Richards managed to delay the anti-Mormon mob by deflecting gun barrels with a walking stick as they were forced through the jail's solitary entrance.

=== South America ===
South America also has its share of martial arts devoted to stick-fighting, including Venezuela's juego del garrote, Brazil's Capoeira and Maculelê, Trinidad's calinda and the South Americans' Eskrima Kombat.

=== Asia ===
Sticks and staves of various sizes are common weapons in Asian martial arts, in which they vary in design, size, weight, materials and methodology, and are often used interchangeably and alongside open-hand techniques. For example, eskrima or arnis of the Philippines uses sticks traditionally crafted from rattan or from butterfruit tree and may be wielded singly or as a pair.

=== Africa ===
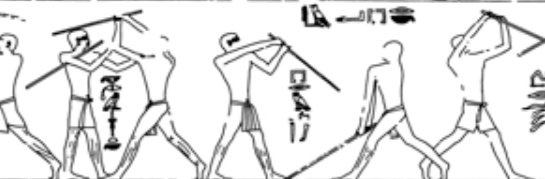
Engravings at the Abusir necropolis showing stick fighting

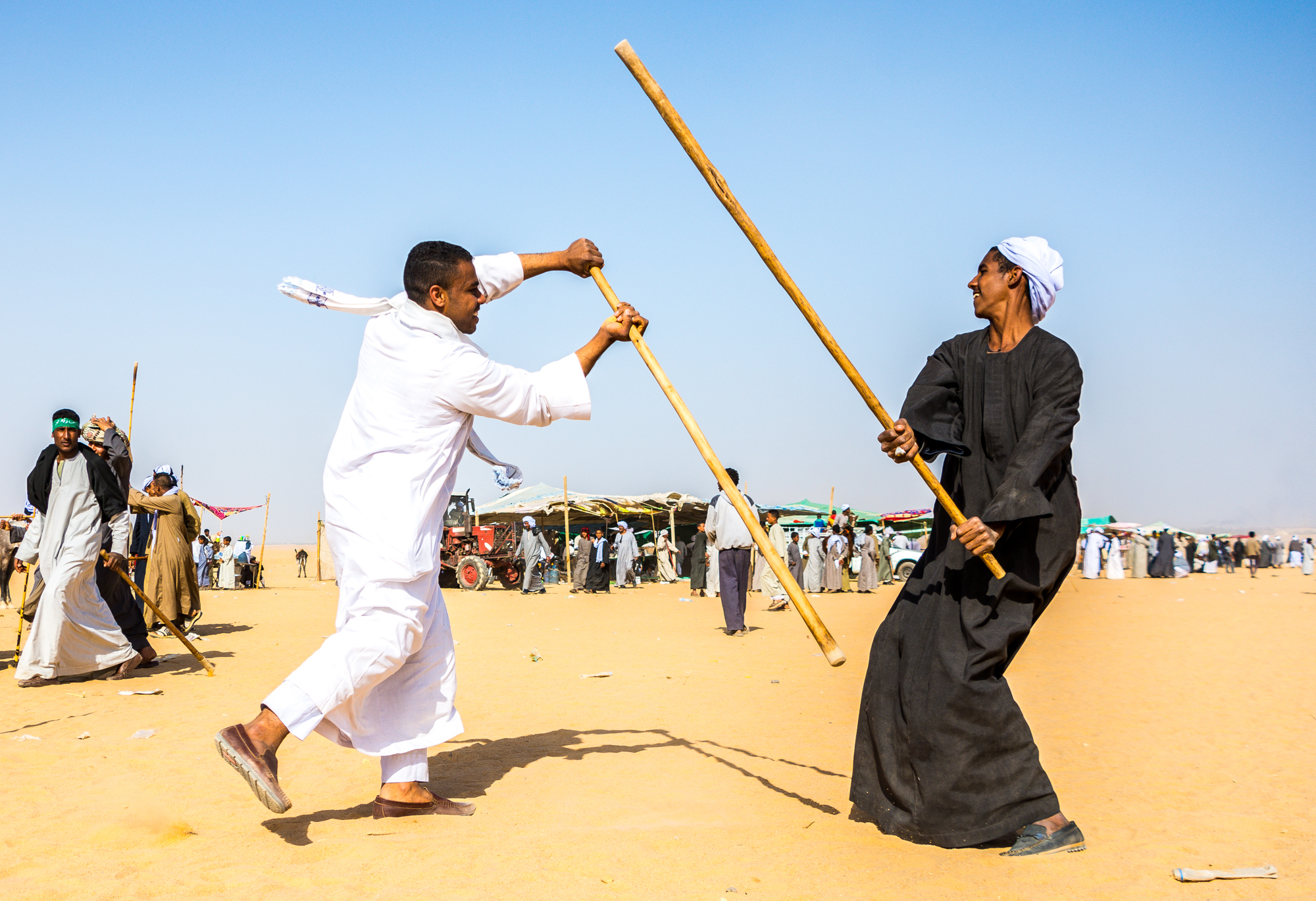
Egyptian men from Upper Egypt performing Tahtib, a traditional stick-fighting game and folk art practiced mainly in southern Egypt.

Egyptians in Upper Egypt practice Tahtib, a stick-fighting martial art thought to trace its origin from Ancient Egyptians stick-fighting depicted on the engravings at Abusir .

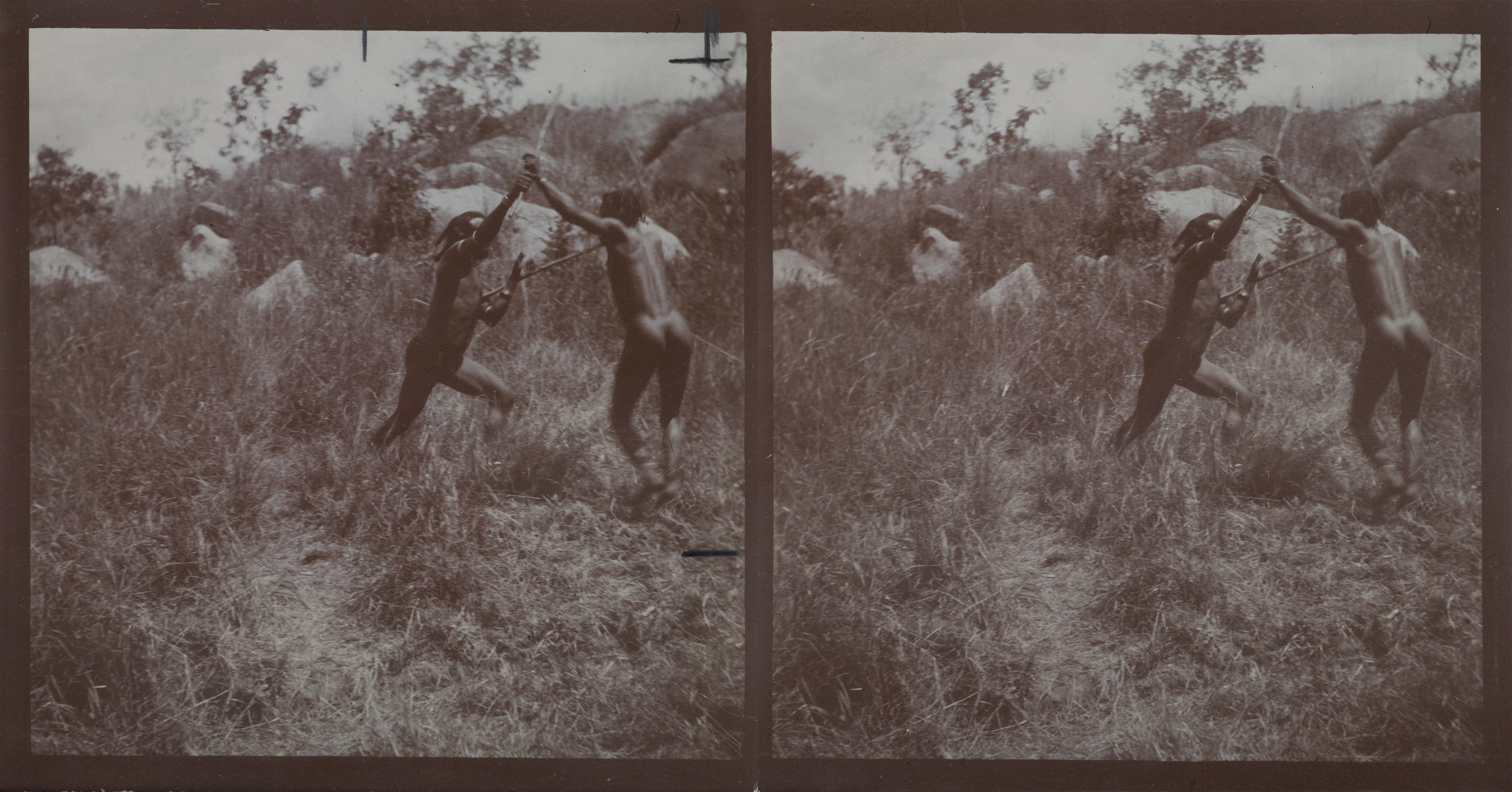
Maasai warriors stick fighting

On tribes such as the Surma people of Ethiopia, donga stick-fighting is an important cultural practice and the best means of showing off to look for a bride, nude or nearly so, and their more warlike neighbors, the Nyangatom people, Pokot people, Turkana people who fight duels bare-chested, the aim being to inflict visible stripes on the back of the adversary, using not plain staffs but sticks with a flexible, whipping tail-end.

=== Law enforcement ===
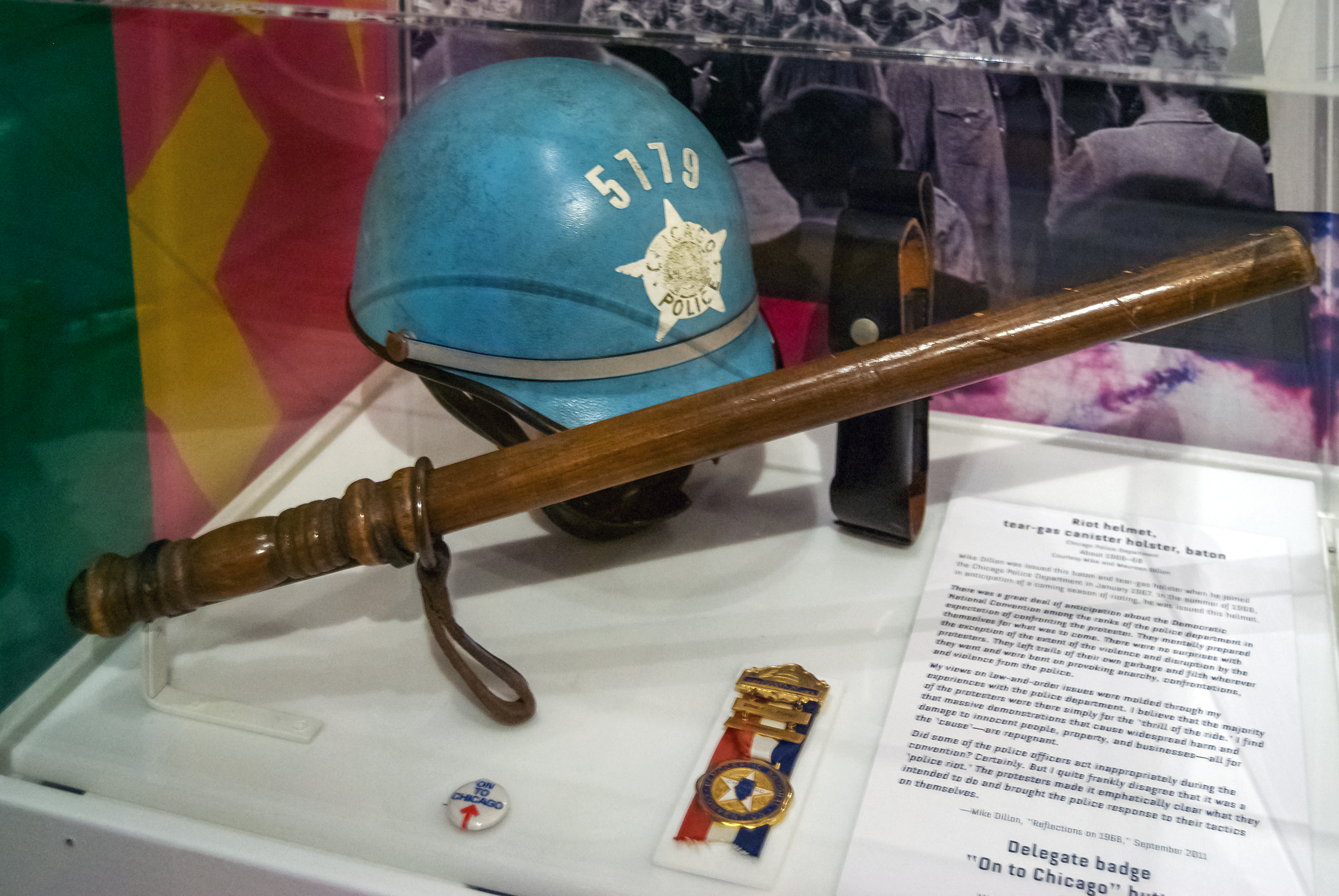
Chicago Police helmet and billy club.

Laws enforcement personnel in many countries use the baton a roughly cylindrical club made of wood, rubber, plastic, or metal. It is carried as a compliance tool and defensive weapon. The name baton comes from the French bâton (stick), In modern police training, the primary targets are large nerve clusters, such as the common peroneal nerve in the mid-thigh and large, easily targetable muscle groups, such as the quadriceps and biceps. The baton is swung in fast, "snapping" strikes to these areas, sometimes only making contact with the tip. Taken together, these are intended to impair the subject's ability to continue advancing.

== See also ==
- List of stick sports
- Angampora
- Banshay
- Bataireacht
- Bōjutsu
- Calinda
- Canne de combat
- Fight with Cudgels
- Gatka
- Jogo do pau
- Juego del palo
- Jūkendō
- Jōdō
- Kalaripayattu
- Kendo
- Kenjutsu
- Krabi–krabong
- Kuttu Varisai
- Mardani khel
- Nguni stick fighting
- Pugil stick
- Quarterstaff, British historical stick fighting weapon
- Shillelagh (club)
- Silambam
- Silambam Asia
- Tahtib
- Tanbō
- Thang-ta
- Varma kalai
- World Silambam Association
- Foam weapon
