= Singlestick =

British martial art using a short wooden stick

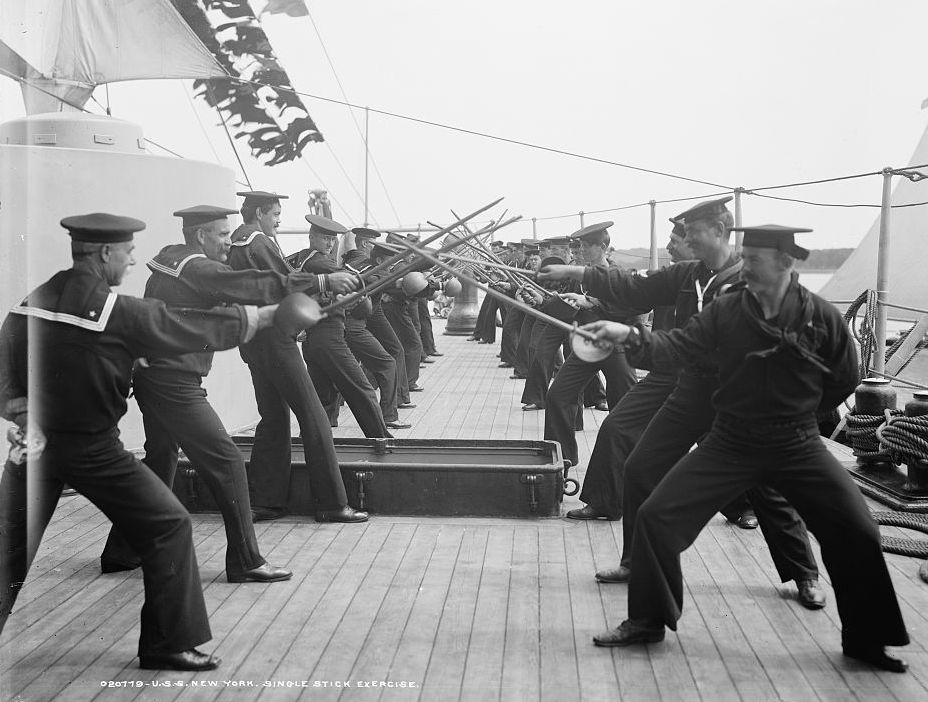
- U.S. sailors practice with the singlestick
- Also known as: Single-stick, cudgels
- Focus: Weaponry
- Hardness: Full-contact
- Country of origin: Kingdom of Great Britain
- Olympic sport: Yes (1904 Summer Olympics only)

Singlestick is a martial art that uses a wooden stick as its weapon. It began as a way of training soldiers in the use of backswords (such as the sabre or the cutlass). Canne de combat, a French form of stick fighting, is similar to singlestick play, which also includes a self-defense variant with a walking stick.

== Weapon ==
The singlestick itself is a slender, round wooden rod, traditionally of ash, with a basket hilt. Singlesticks are typically around 34 inches (86 cm) in length, and 1 inch (2.5 cm) in diameter, and thicker at one end than the other, used as a weapon of attack and defence, the thicker end being thrust through a cup-shaped hilt of basket-work to protect the hand. It bears approximately the same relationship to the backsword as the foil to the small sword in being a sporting version of the weapon for safe practice.

The original form of the singlestick was the waster, which appeared in the 16th century and was merely a wooden sword used in practice for the backsword, and of the same general shape. By the first quarter of the 17th century wasters had become simple clubs known as cudgels with the addition of a sword guard. When the basket hilt came into general use about twenty five years later, a wicker one was added to the singlestick, replacing the heavy metal hilt of the backsword. The guards, cuts and parries in singlestick play were at first identical with those of backsword play, no thrusts being allowed.

== History and technique ==
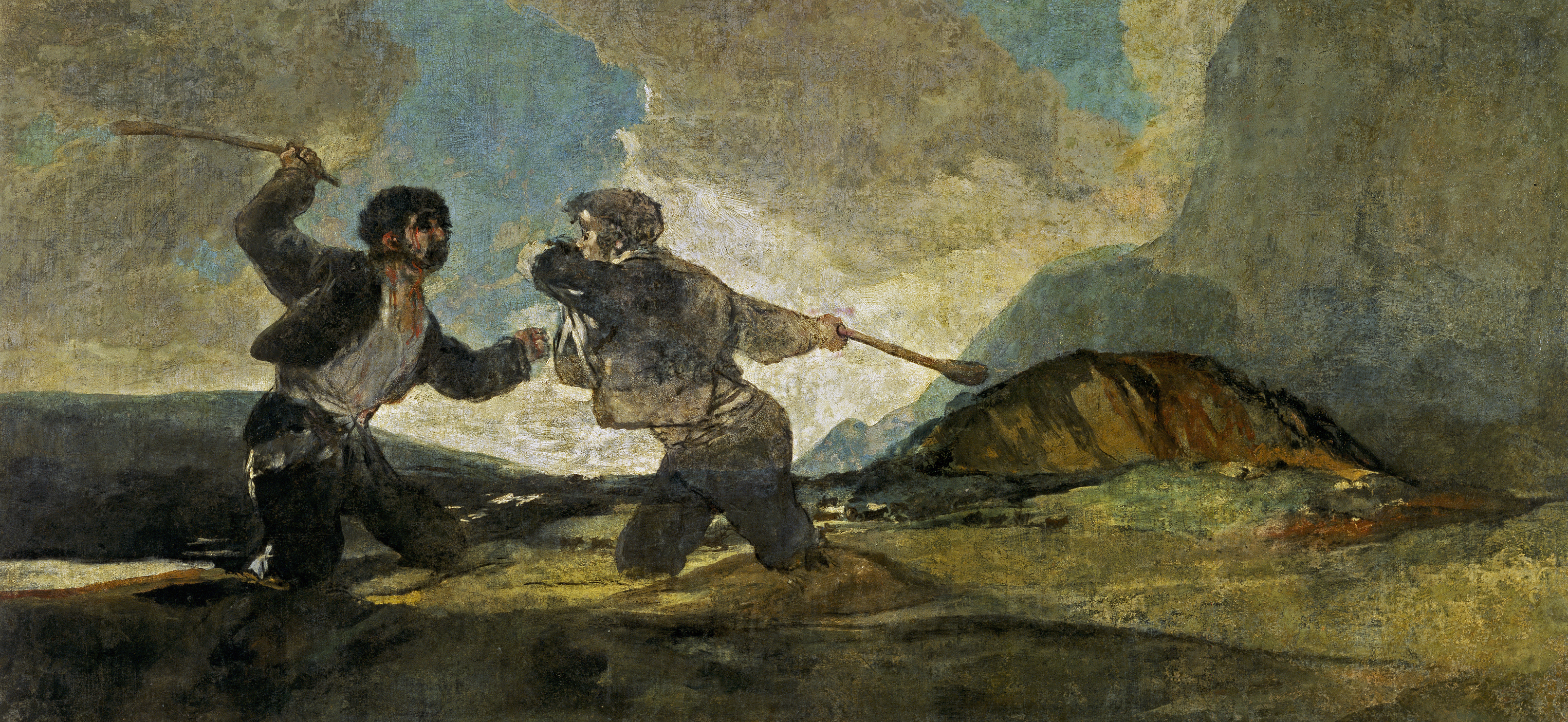
Fight with Cudgels (Spanish: Duelo a garrotazos), a painting by Francisco Goya (Museo del Prado, Madrid) showing two men dueling with cudgels

In 16th-century England, hits below the girdle were considered unfair. In the 18th century, all parts of the person became valid targets. By the turn of the 19th century, the target area had been restricted to the upper body (with the exception of the back of the head) and the upper part of the forward leg. These rules are in use today by the Association for Historical Fencing. Historically, the target area has varied, with bouts sometimes only being decided by the drawing of blood from the head of one of the contestants, in the manner of the Mensur.

Under Kings George I and George II, backsword play with sticks was immensely popular under the names cudgel-play and singlesticking, not only in the cities but in the countryside as well, wrestling being its only rival. Towards the end of the 18th century the play became very restricted. The players were placed near together, the feet remaining immovable and all strokes being delivered with a whip-like action of the wrist from a high hanging guard, the hand being held above the head. Blows on any part of the body above the waist were allowed, but all except those aimed at the head were employed only to gain openings, as each bout was decided only by a broken head, i.e. a cut on the head that drew blood. At first the left hand and arm were used to ward off blows not parried with the stick, but near the close of the 18th century the left hand grasped a scarf tied loosely round the left thigh, the elbow being raised to protect the face. Thomas Hughes's story Tom Brown's School Days contains a spirited description of cudgel-play during the first half of the 19th century. This kind of single-sticking practically died out during the third quarter of that century, but was revived as weapon training for the sabre within some military and civilian academies, the play being essentially the same as for that weapon. The point was introduced and leg hits were allowed.

American President Theodore Roosevelt and his friend General Leonard Wood were said to be fond of this sport and that they used to emerge from a contest quite bruised from their rounds. In "Letters to his Children", Theodore Roosevelt writes in a letter dated December 26, 1902, "Late in the afternoon I played at single stick with General Wood and Mr. [Bob] Ferguson...We have to try to hit as light as possible, but sometimes we hit hard, and today I have a bump over one eye and a swollen wrist." However the use of the term in this context may be more colloquial than technical. It is very unlikely that Theodore Roosevelt or General Wood ever practiced the British sport of Singlestick; more likely, Roosevelt's use of the term refers to the French art of canne de combat. Indeed, their own fencing instructor Maître François Darrieulat was a veteran of the French Army, where singlestick was unknown but cane was mandatory for officers, and many other facts tend to point out that situation.

Singlestick was an event at the 1904 Summer Olympics, but the sport was already in decline. Again recent investigation found that most likely singlestick was not present at the 1904 Olympics, but rather a form of cane fighting. Singlestick was very seldom taught in late 19th century United States until it was introduced for a short while in Annapolis, and most of the competitors came from academies where singlestick was unknown but French cane was taught. The use of the term "singlestick" in contemporary newspapers explains the confusion as it was an umbrella term at the time to refer to combat sports and games using a stick such as singlestick, cane, quarterstaff or even kendo. With the introduction of the light Italian fencing sabre in the early 20th century, singlestick play became unnecessary and was subsequently neglected. In the UK, Singlestick competition ceased in the Services in the 1950s, although the skills continue to be passed down from one generation of fencing Professor to the next. The singlestick of the British Armed Services of the Great War period was passed to Scotland's National Fencing Coach in the mid-1960s, and thence passed on to the founders of many HEMA groups in the UK. Stickplay with wooden swords as a school for the cutlass remained common in some navies.

The art, occasionally practised by a few fencing veterans in the United Kingdom, was revived by the Royal Navy in the 1980s. Within today's martial arts community, a growing interest in traditional Western martial arts has revived interest in this particular form of weapon training.

== Media ==
In the television series Elementary, based on Sir Arthur Conan Doyle's Sherlock Holmes stories, but updated to the 21st Century and relocated mostly to New York, Sherlock (played by Jonny Lee Miller) frequently practices singlestick.

== See also ==
- Arnis
- Bataireacht
- Bâton français
- Bokken
- Egyptian stick fencing
- Federschwert
- Shinai
- Jogo do pau
- Baton
- Bartitsu
