= Juego del palo =

Traditional sport in Canary Islands

Juego del palo (Spanish) Banod (Guanche) Banot
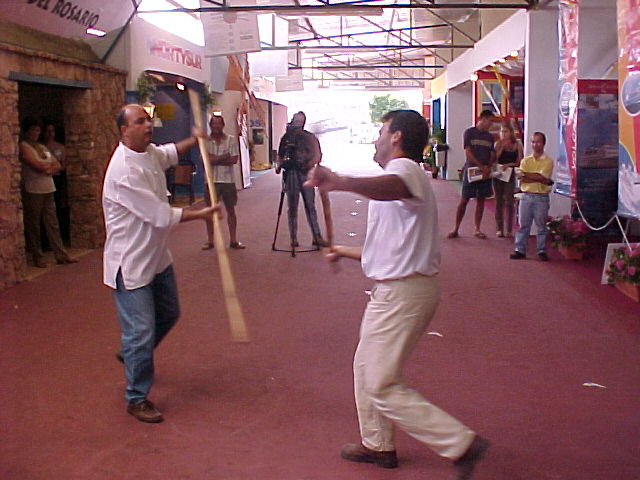
- Focus: Weapons (sticks)
- Country of origin: Canary Islands; Spain
- Olympic sport: No

Juego del palo or banot (Spanish pronunciation: [ˈxweɣo ðel ˈpalo], game of the stick; Guanche: banod) is a traditional martial art/folk sport of stick-fighting practiced in the Canary Islands. It involves the combative use of a slender stick from 4 to 6 feet (1.2 to 1.8 m) long, wielded in both hands, and characterised by fluid motion in attacks and defences.

== History ==
Though similar stick fighting techniques are present in the Iberian peninsula and Asia (e.g. Portuguese, Galician and Macanese jogo do pau), the origins of juego del palo may be traced back to the Guanches, the indigenous people of the Canary Islands in pre-colonial times during the early 15th century.

Gaspar Frutuoso records its use in an anecdote when the Portuguese were turned on by the local king Ossinisso, the locals fending the Portuguese off with their paos tostados (heat-treated sticks).

Another account comes from Spanish engineer named Leonardo Torriani wrote a history of the Canary Islands in 1590 and included a record of early juego del palo, accompanied by an illustration of two Guanche warriors performing a type of ritual combat with short staves in a small arena. Torriani wrote;

"When two Canarians went to duel, they met at a special place established for this purpose. It was a small enclosure with a level, raised stone platform at each end. To begin, they each stood upon a platform, armed with three of the smooth throwing stones they call tahuas, and also with the stick called magodo or amodeghe. Then they dodged the stones as they were thrown, skillfully twisting their bodies without moving their feet. Next, they stepped down and fenced with the staves, each one trying to gain advantage over the other, as is our custom also."

The art has been maintained through to the present day, undergoing a particular renaissance during the 1970s as part of a general effort to maintain native Canarian folk traditions. It bears resemblance to the Portuguese martial art jogo do pau and the Venezuelan form juego del garrote.

Juego del palo is now a popular sports activity in the Canaries and has been the subject of considerable academic interest as well, with a number of professional conferences having been held at local universities to investigate the history, culture, and technique of the art.

== Description ==
This may be described as a form of stick fencing between two players that is characterized by the spontaneous interplay of attacking techniques and defense techniques. No protective equipment is worn in traditional juego del palo; safety is maintained through the skilled control of attacks, which are restrained rather than being made with full force upon the opponent's body.

== Styles ==
Juego del palo is divided into a number of specific styles or local traditions that have been developed on particular islands within the archipelago, and/or by particular families. The nine primary styles practiced in modern juego del palo include (mostly named after founders of the styles): Deniz, Morales, Verga, Acosta, Quintero, Vidal, Confiero, juego del garrote ('game of the club') and juego de la lata ('game of the tin'). Each style is distinguished from the others by specific fighting techniques and strategies, and also by the rules under which it is played as a competitive game.

== See also ==
- Jōdō
- Choobazi
