= Shaqawat Baghdad =

Iraqi outlaws historically active in Baghdad

Shaqawat Baghdad (Arabic: شقاوات بغداد, lit. 'The scoundrels of Baghdad') is an old term referring to thieves, vigilantes, and outlaws, who typically wield weapons like a khanjar, and sometimes lead gangs or work for hire, mostly in Baghdad, Iraq. Although this phenomenon has ceased to exist in modern Baghdad, there are many records of such people existing dating back to the early Abbasid Caliphate until the 20th century. The shaqawat were also prominent in defending Baghdad in the Ottoman Empire due to the city's lack of protection from the Sultans.

== Etymology ==
The name "Shaqawat Baghdad", meaning the miscreants or scoundrels of the city of Baghdad, comes from the word “shakawa” (Arabic: أشقياء) is an old metaphorical word for a strong-willed person who carries a weapon, and engages in acts of bravery. This behavior is called in the colloquial Baghdadi language shaqawa.

== Historical background ==
The origin of the term can be traced back to the era of the Abbasid Caliphate, where they appeared for the first time after the death of Caliph al-Amin, and his killing by members of the army of his brother al-Ma’mun. However, the more common name given to them at that time was al-Shatar or the 'Ayyarun. In 1170, the Abbasid Caliph al-Mustadi hired a group of shaqawat to assassinate the general of the army Qutb al-Din, who had threatened the Caliph's power, in his house.

=== Under the Ottoman Empire ===
These groups notably began to emerge in Baghdad in the Ottoman Empire due to deterioration of economic, social, and health conditions under Ottoman rule. Because of this neglect, the families of each Baghdadi neighborhood began establishing a majlis per every area, and those families hired the shaqawat to protect their area and ensure that law and order are established. This civilian system was continued until the dissolution of the Ottoman Empire. It was around this time these groups became known as "Shaqawat al-Mahalat" (Arabic: شقاوات المحلات, lit. 'The scoundrels of the localities') Every area in Baghdad had a gang of shaqawat. Iraqi historian Abbas al-Baghdadi emphasized the important part the shaqawat played in Baghdad's contemporary history.

Although they were hired to enforce order, some of the shaqawat gangs conflicted and fought each other. Which was an issue that Ottoman viceroy Mehmed Namık Pasha failed to tackle in the 1860s. Due to the Ottoman neglect, some of the shaqawat also tended to disobey and view the occupying government with contempt and disdain. Ottoman forces responded with harsh punishments such as executions or exiling those they arrested at the time. Reportedly, these gangs adhered to the ethics and traditions of Iraqi society and did not discriminate against anyone based on their background.

=== Activities in the 20th century ===
After the collapse of the Ottoman Empire, the shaqawat became active in the 1920 Iraqi revolt, where many outlaws began harassing British forces. As a result, they would then be arrested and executed by the British. Among the executed was a revolutionary Iraqi named "Abd al-Majid Kanna", who reportedly killed many British troops in resistance, and was the uncle of a later Iraqi politician Khalil Kanna. These outlaws were also noted for helping poorer people during the revolt.

In the Kingdom of Iraq, several politicians used and hired the shaqawat to achieve political goals and personal interests. Among the most well-known was Nuri al-Said, who allegedly hired an outlaw named "Hajji Shaker" to assassinate some of his opponents. Despite being associated with Baghdad, several areas around Baghdad also saw similar activity on a smaller scale. Those outlaws would also join political parties, especially during and after the leadership of Abd al-Karim Qasim. It is also alleged that former president Saddam Hussein had occasionally used the shaqawat to eliminate opponents.

== Recorded examples ==
Old Baghdadi newspapers frequently printed stories about the shaqawat. One case was an anti-monarchist Nasserist named Jassim al-Shaikhli al-Abbasi. He accused the Iraqi monarchy of subservience and collaboration with foreigners, and would attack it frequently. He and his companion Atta Al-Badri were later accused of attempting to assassinate Nuri al-Said. He was imprisoned in Kut prison, released a year later, and reinstated to his job after a special pardon from al-Said. Who said detective stories inspired that al-Abbasi to take up his vigilantism.

A popular example was a recorded figure named "Ahmed Qardash" and, was known for a story in which he and his gang broke into a house belonging to a Jewish merchant. But after Qardash found some food in the house, and ate some. Suddenly, he asked his gang to stop the robbery and put everything back where it belonged, explaining that “there is now a relationship between him and the residents of the house, and it is not permissible to steal their property.” Ahmed's story provides evidence that the Shaqawat were not devoid of values and morals, but were naturally part of the moral system in Iraqi society at the time, which was built on chivalry. Another example is of a woman who lived in the Kingdom of Iraq named "Fattuma Umm Khanjar", who used to hang a khanjar from her belt to threaten people with.

== See also ==
- 'Ayyarun
- Shifta
