= Ayyār =

Member of a historical warrior group in the Near East

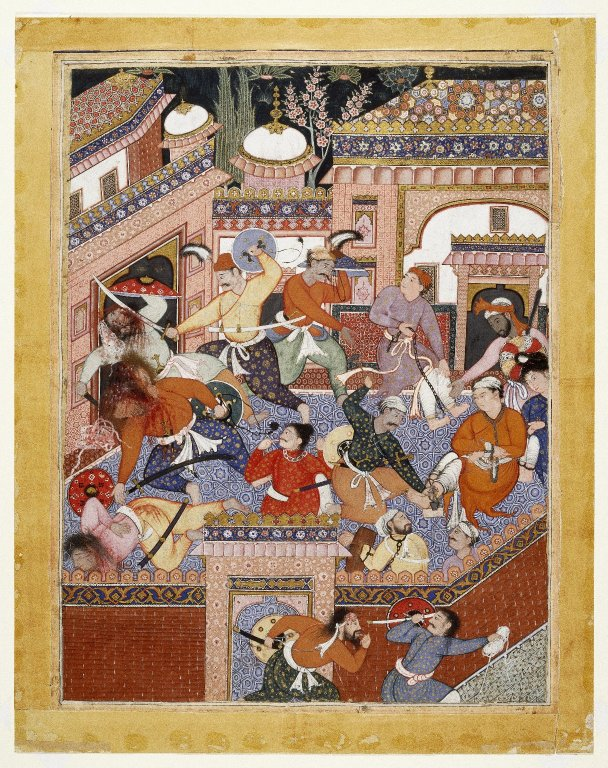
16th-century Indian painting depicting members of the 'Ayyarun slitting the throats of prison guards from the Hamzanama.

Ayyār (Arabic: عيار, romanized: ʿayyār, pl. ʿayyārūn; Persian: عیار, romanized: Ayyâr, pl. Ayyârân) refers to a person associated with a class of warriors in Iraq and Persia from the 9th to the 12th centuries. The word literally means vagabond. The 'Ayyarun were associated with futuwwa, or medieval Islamic organizations located in cities. They were notable for being youth groups, typically from lower classes, that engaged in violent acts, thievery, assassinations, and violent rebellions against established systems in many Islamic cities. Often clashing with the ruling dynasties. They typically gain power within a city once a centralized body is weakened.

== Historical origins ==
'Ayyarun are believed to predate Islam, since they are said to have distinct Persian (Afghan and Iranian) customs, and they were active in regions corresponding to the territories of the Sasanian Empire. The word itself literally means "vagabond" in Arabic. The word was also used to refer to futuwwa, especially as among the titles of the leaders of the 'Ayyarun was "Ra's al-Fityan." Although the 'Ayyarun were predominantly active in Iraq, they were also active in other regions such as in Persia, the Levantine, and Anatolia.

Most of the writing about them centers on their activities in Baghdad from the 10th to the 12th centuries. Baghdad was ruled by the Buyids (945–1055) back then. They were known for many criminal activities, such as extorting taxes on roads and markets, burning wealthy quarters and markets, and looting the homes of the rich by night. For several years (1028–33), al-Burjumi and Ibn al-Mawsili, leaders of the 'Ayyarun, ruled the city due to governmental instability.

== 'Ayyarun in Baghdad ==
=== Emergence in Abbasid Baghdad ===
==== Activities in the Fourth Fitna ====
The first mention of the 'Ayyarun in Arabic sources can be found in 812 during the Fourth Fitna, which was the strife between al-Amin and al-Ma'mun, in which they played a major role in the strife. When al-Amin was besieged in Baghdad and his soldiers were unable to defend themselves, they called the 'Ayyarun for help. The 'Ayyarun elected their own chiefs, and would cast themselves into battle without weapons. But around 965, weapons, such as clubs (called "kafirkubat") and bows, began to be distributed to any 'Ayyar hired as a hitman for assassination. They began to raid the gates of Baghdad, which resulted in the deaths of tens of people. Around this time, the artillery of these groups also consisted of shields made of tar-covered mats and nosebags filled with rocks.

In 814, a year after al-Ma'mun was appointed Caliph of the Abbasid Caliphate, the 'Ayyarun supported a revolt led by a man named Hassan al-Hersh against the Abbasid governor of Baghdad, al-Hasan ibn Sahl. They would take over a portion of Baghdad and loot people of their money. Al-Ma'mun responded by ordering a military campaign the expel them from the city. However, ibn Sahl's governance became notorious for its bad reforms, which alienated many Abbasid civilians from him. As a result, the 'Ayyarun took advantage of people's dissatisfaction by enlisting them to rebel against the centralized body. Although the 'Ayyarun hated music, they proclaimed the Abbasid prince and singer Ibrahim ibn al-Mahdi caliph in 817, and called for the overthrow of al-Ma'mun. Ibrahim was not fit for a political position due to his career as an artist. He later resigned and briefly hid in the home of one of the 'Ayyarun.

In 1170, the Abbasid Caliph al-Mustadi hired a group of 'Ayyarun, or shaqawat, to assassinate the general of the army Qutb al-Din, who had threatened the Caliph's power, in his house.

==== Conflict with the Buyid Dynasty ====
In 1017, the Buyids' control of Baghdad began to weaken. This allowed them to confiscate a lot of money belonging to the Buyids and their supporters. Their activities increased clearly in 1025, when they were dissatisfied with the Buyid authority. The 'Ayyarun went far in blatant defiance and subjugation to the point that they would walk at night with torches and candles. They also began to harass the Buyid emir Musharrif al-Dawla and threaten to rob him treasury. His successor, Jalal al-Dawla, would take the 'Ayyarun threat seriously, especially after several attacks and massacres the 'Ayyarun launched under the leadership of Ya'ma al-Musami. There was also an event on the Tuesday night of 29 December 1030 in which a group of 'Ayyarun broke into an Abbasid palace and robbed garments out of it.

==== Decline in power ====
These gangs notably took advantage of current circumstances to achieve their goals and continue their activities throughout the weaker times of the Abbasid Caliphate. However, during the rule of the Caliph al-Nasir, the leadership of the 'Ayyarun began to decline. Al-Nasir was firm in tax collecting and centralized Baghdad. Due to this, the 'Ayyarun couldn't make enough money. As such, their influence and power began to fade.

=== Role in Ottoman Baghdad ===
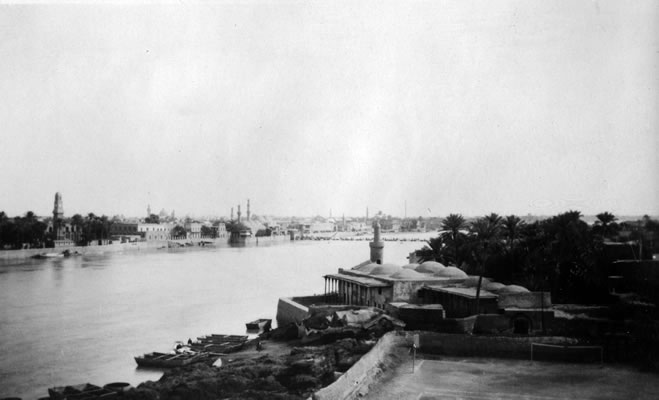
Similar groups to the 'Ayyarun existed in Ottoman Baghdad up until the early 20th century.

Similar groups began to emerge in Baghdad in the Ottoman Empire due to deterioration of economic, social, and health conditions in the city under Ottoman rule. Because of this neglect, the families of each Baghdadi neighborhood began establishing a majlis per every area, and those families decided to hire 'Ayyarun as guards to protect their area and ensure that law and order are established. This civilian system was continued until the dissolution of the Ottoman Empire. However, these groups became known as "Shaqawat al-Mahalat" (Arabic: شقاوات المحلات, lit. 'The scoundrels of the localities') in Baghdad. Iraqi historian Abbas al-Baghdadi would eventually coin the term "Shaqawat Baghdad" (Arabic: شقاوات بغداد, lit. 'The scoundrels of Baghdad') to refer to this group of 'Ayyarun.

Although the shaqawat rebelled against the system, participated in outlaw activities, and most of its members were from the youth, just like the 'Ayyarun. The shaqawat were notable for having more noble principles and values compared to the 'Ayyār. They were also instrumental in helping the lower classes in Baghdadi society. The shaqawat have also since become a part of Baghdadi folklore in the present day.

== 'Ayyarun in Karbala ==
=== Emergence in the early 19th century ===
In the early 19th century, the tradespeople and religious elite of Karbala that controlled the city wanted to stir Ottoman control away from Karbala's affairs. Karbala had been an important city in Ottoman Iraq, and the Mamluk Dynasty had largely controlled many sources of its wealth. Including lavish gifts brought to it from Persia and India, the ziyarat lines, and the tax money. While the Sayyid elite of the city owned only a third of the working-class land. The Mamluk-Ottoman also failed to protect Karbala from the Wahhabi sacking of 1801, which gave Qajar Iran an excuse to attempt to annex the Shi'i shrines.

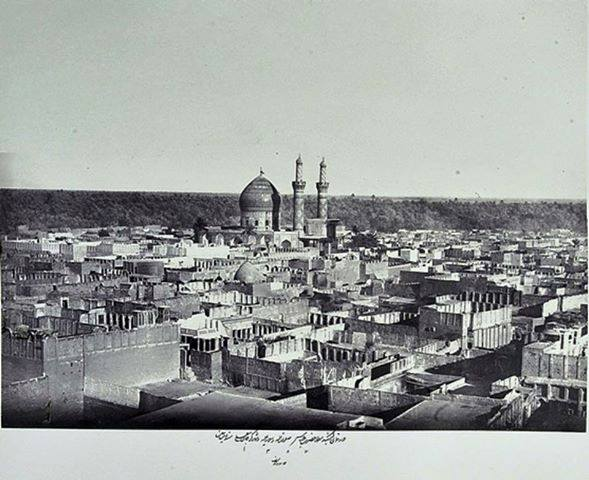
Al-Abbas Shrine in Karbala in 1889.

Beginning in the 1820s, urban gangs made up of young people began running protection rackets, co-opting merchant families, and forming links with several different Arab tribes. They were motivated by financial reasons, religious fanaticism, or to seek Karbala'i autonomy from the Ottomans, who were seen as "alien Sunni troops." These youth gangs, whose members came from families of tradespeople and laborers, were called 'Ayyarun based on the gangs from medieval Iraq. Although they also went by the generic names of lutis and awbash too. Similar to the Abbasid era, Ayyarun, they were noted to be vagabonds and thieves of the lower classes. They often emerged in certain quarters, made alliances with noblemen, and engaged in battles and conflicts against rival 'Ayyār gangs. They were also hired by members of the Karbala'i elite as bodyguards and hit men.

As a result of the weakening Mamluk Dynasty and these gangs, the Mamluk-appointed governors were expelled from the city. Shi'i Arab notables attempted to monopolize the city's resources but had no tradition of legitimate rule. As a result, they hired brigand fugitives from the city. One of them, the Sayyid Ibrahim al-Za'farani, emerged as the main leader of the many Arab 'Ayyar factions, while the Persian minority factions were headed by a Persian-Arab man named Mirza Salih. Both became known as "Men of the people" among the 'Ayyar. In 1842, Karbala had 14 local 'Ayyār gangs each with 60 to 400 members, with a total of 2,000-2,500 members.

Beginning from 1826, Sultan Mahmud II began a movement to centralize the empire. The last Mamluk viceroy of Baghdad, Dawud Pasha, was replaced by Ali Rıza Pasha in 1831 with the task of centralizing Ottoman Iraq. Due to the power the 'Ayyarun held in Karbala, the Pasha made a deal with the gangs and their leaders as a compromise. Al-Za'farani would pay a tribute of 70,000 qirans to Baghdad. However, there were many hopes at the time that the Ottomans would overthrow gang-rule in Karbala due to the violent incidents that came with their rule.

=== Role in the 1843 Siege of Karbala ===
In 1842, Mehmed Necib Pasha replaced Ali Rıza Pasha, who advocated for the end of Karbala's independent authority and for a centralized Ottoman authority over Karbala. In response, a coalition of 'Ayyarun gangs was formed to support autonomy from the Ottoman Empire with the support of some of the Karbala'i elite. Although some of the clergy preferred Ottoman rulership due to the gangs' violence. One officer reportedly promised 150 piaster for every slain "luti" head. During the siege, the gangs stirred up and commanded civilians to fight against Ottoman forces who came from Bab al-Najaf. They commanded Arab Bedouins who allied with the 'Ayyarun due to low resources. Nevertheless, many of the 'Ayyarun and Bedouins, including al-Za'farani, fled from the city through Bab al-Hurr, where they would then be hunted down by 3,000 Turkish troops. Iranian gangs led by Salih, however, remained in the battle. By the end of the battle, centralized Ottoman rulership returned to Karbala. Although the siege had been deadly, many Karbala'is rejoiced that gang rule in the city had been expelled. The weakened gangs spread throughout Iraq, where they would eventually fade into obscurity.

== 'Ayyarun in Persia ==
Around the late 1030s under the Seljuk Empire, 'Ayyarun bandits began to raid the Iranian city of Nishapur. In response, local vigilante groups in the city emerged to fight against and defend it, the 'Ayyarun.

== See also ==
- Javānmardi
- Samak-e Ayyar, an ancient Persian story about an Ayyār named Samak
- Shaqawat Baghdad
- Umro Ayyar, fictional Ayyār in the Islamic epic Hamzanama
