= Naboot =

Egyptian quarterstaff

A naboot (nabboot, asaya, asa, shoum) is a Fighting stick constructed of palm wood or rattan. It originated in Egypt and is used in the martial art of Tahtib still practiced today in upper Egypt. In Egypt the Naboot was the main weapon of the Futuwwa , in 1906 a law was passed in Egypt banning the use of Naboots in fights, the law aimed to strip the Futuwwas of their power

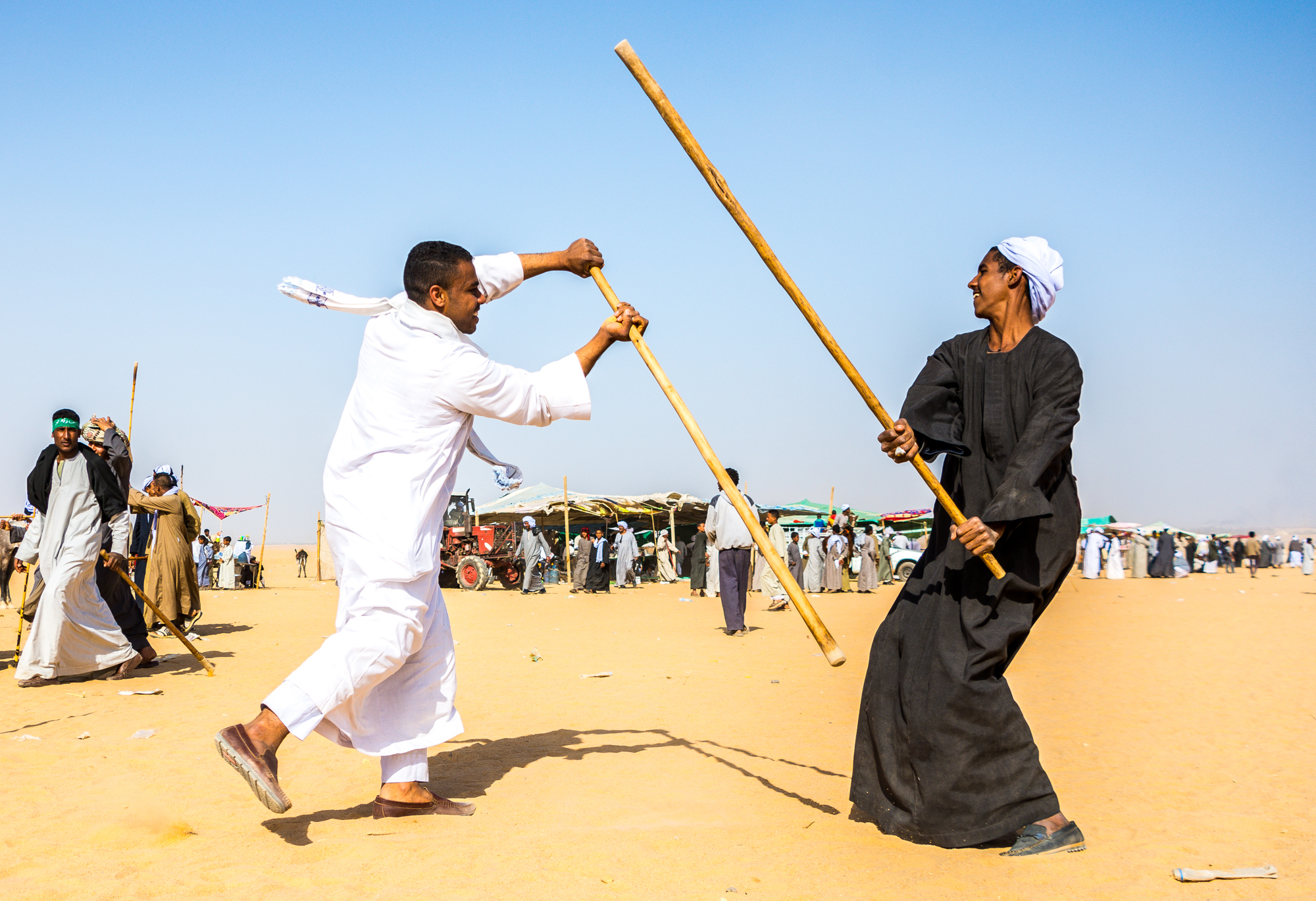
Egyptian men from Upper Egypt performing Tahtib, a traditional stick-fighting game and folk art practiced mainly in southern Egypt.
