= Khalil Kanna =

Iraqi politician (1905–1995)

Khalil Isma'il Kanna al-Bayati
- خليل إسماعيل كنة البياتي
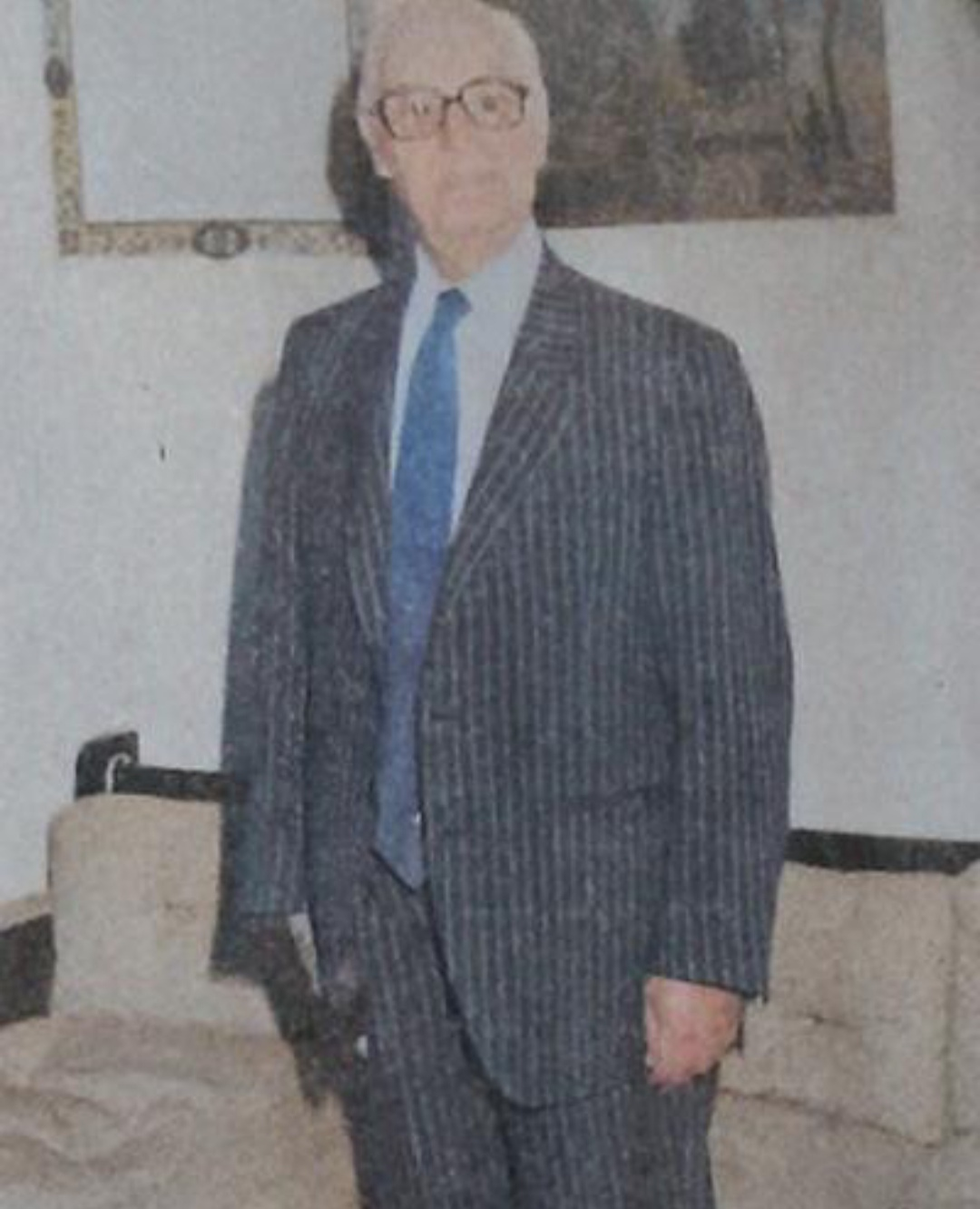

Minister of Finance
- In office 17 December 1955 – 7 June 1957
- Monarch: Faisal II
- Prime Minister: Nuri al-Sa'id
- Preceded by: Ali Mumtaz al-Daftary
- Succeeded by: Dhia' Ja'far

Minister of Education
- In office 29 January 1953 – 15 September 1953
- Monarch: Faisal II
- Prime Minister: Jamil al-Midfai
- Preceded by: Abd al-Majid al-Qasab

Minister of Education
- In office 15 September 1950 – 10 July 1952
- Monarch: Faisal II
- Prime Minister: Nuri al-Sa'id
- Succeeded by: Sa'd al-Alwan

Personal details
- Born: 1905 Fallujah, Ottoman Empire
- Died: 1995 (aged 89–90) Baghdad, Ba'athist Iraq

Khalil Isma'ili Kanna al-Bayati (Arabic: خليل إسماعيل كنة البياتي, 1905–1995), otherwise simply known as Khalil Kanna (Arabic: خليل كنة), was a Muslim Iraqi Turcoman politician and protégé of Iraq's premier Nuri Pasha al-Sa'id in the Kingdom of Iraq. Kanna worked in several government positions in the kingdom and wrote for several newspapers at the time. He was a founding member of the Constitutional Union Party and was elected to its central committee. Kanna was also a family relative of Nuri Pasha due to marrying one of the daughters of his family. Due to this connection, Kanna was close to the pasha and was often his spokesman.

== Early life ==
=== Background ===
Khalil Kanna was born in Fallujah in 1905 to the Sunni Muslim al-Bayati family which was of Turcoman origin. His uncle, Abd al-Majid Kanna, was a shaqawati outlaw during British colonial rule over Iraq and had fought during the 1920 Iraqi Revolt in which he killed several British troops. He spread leaflets throughout communities calling for resistance. As a result of his actions, Abd al-Majid was captured, tried, and executed by British troops and was buried in the Sheikh Junaid cemetery in al-Karkh. He studied primary school at al-Tafayudh Private School in Baghdad and secondary school at the American University in Beirut, and graduated from the Iraqi College of Law in 1932.

=== Early political activity ===
ng of the 1930 Anglo-Iraqi treaty, Kanna joined the Ahali group led by Ja'far Abu al-Timman. However, he and others later left the group due to its leftist leanings that contradicted their Arab nationalist views. But due to their association, they were still tried, and the Baghdad Criminal Court sentenced him to six months in prison. After he and his colleagues completed their sentences, they were released and returned to their studies at the College of Law, from which he graduated in 1932.

== Political career ==
On March 12, 1946, he was one of the founders of the Arab nationalist al-Istiqlal Party, led by Sheikh Muhammad Mahdi Kubba, and it was approved on April 2, 1946. He was in charge of the newspaper, the Liwa al-Istiqlal. Later, Kanna was elected to the House of Representatives for the eleventh electoral term, which lasted from 17 March 1947 to 23 February 1948.

He held various ministerial positions between 1950 and 1957, including Minister without Portfolio in Tawfiq al-Suwaidi's third cabinet, Minister of Education in Tawfiq al-Suwaidi's third, eleventh, and twelfth cabinets, as well as in Jamil al-Midfa'i's sixth and seventh cabinets. During the 1956 Suez Crisis, a group of 55 Iraqi professors were exiled to Tikrit after Kanna met with them, accusing the professors of inciting student protests. However, Kanna would then travel to Tikrit to inform the professors that the decision of revoking their academic status would be dismissed and that they would return to their homes and jobs.

In Nuri al-Sa'id's thirteenth cabinet, he was appointed the Minister of Finance. During this cabinet, Nuri Pasha formed a minstrel committee to legislate a law to purge the government of corrupt figures who dealt with bribes. Efforts were made by Kanna to pass this law and deal with the obstacles that came with it. However, several influential political parties were against this law out of fear that it would make them lose power in Iraqi politics. This led to Kanna's resignation from the position despite Nuri Pasha's dissuading.

=== Relationship with Abd al-Ilah ===
Khalil Kanna was described by associates who worked with him as having self-confidence, competence, and critical thinking, as he was described as someone who only did things he thought were right. However, his views came into conflict with several authorities in the state, including the royal Regent and Crown Prince Abd al-Ilah. He had attempted to disqualify Kanna from the political elite but eventually decided against it. This was because achieving this would only work by distancing him from Nuri al-Sa'id, who was Kanna's mentor and family relative. Kanna became the general secretary of Nuri Pasha's political party, the Constitutional Union Party. Because of his familial connections with Kanna, Nuri Pasha also appointed him as his spokesman. Kanna's views also aligned with Nuri Pasha's and would sometimes reflect Nuri Pasha's views. Kanna later accused Abd al-Ilah of having a hand in letting him resign from his position as Minister of Finance.
