= Juego del garrote =

- Also known as: juego de garrote venezolano
- Focus: Weaponry
- Country of origin: Venezuela
- Olympic sport: No

Juego del garrote (Venezuelan traditional, woodstick fencing) or juego de garrote larense ('Venezuela Stick fighting') is a Venezuelan martial art that involves machete, stick-fighting, and knife fencing. It is most associated with the Venezuelan state of Lara. However, Garrote is still practiced in Coro state, Guarico and Miranda states, Michael J. Ryan, Research notes, 2013.
