= Choobazi =

Iranian dance

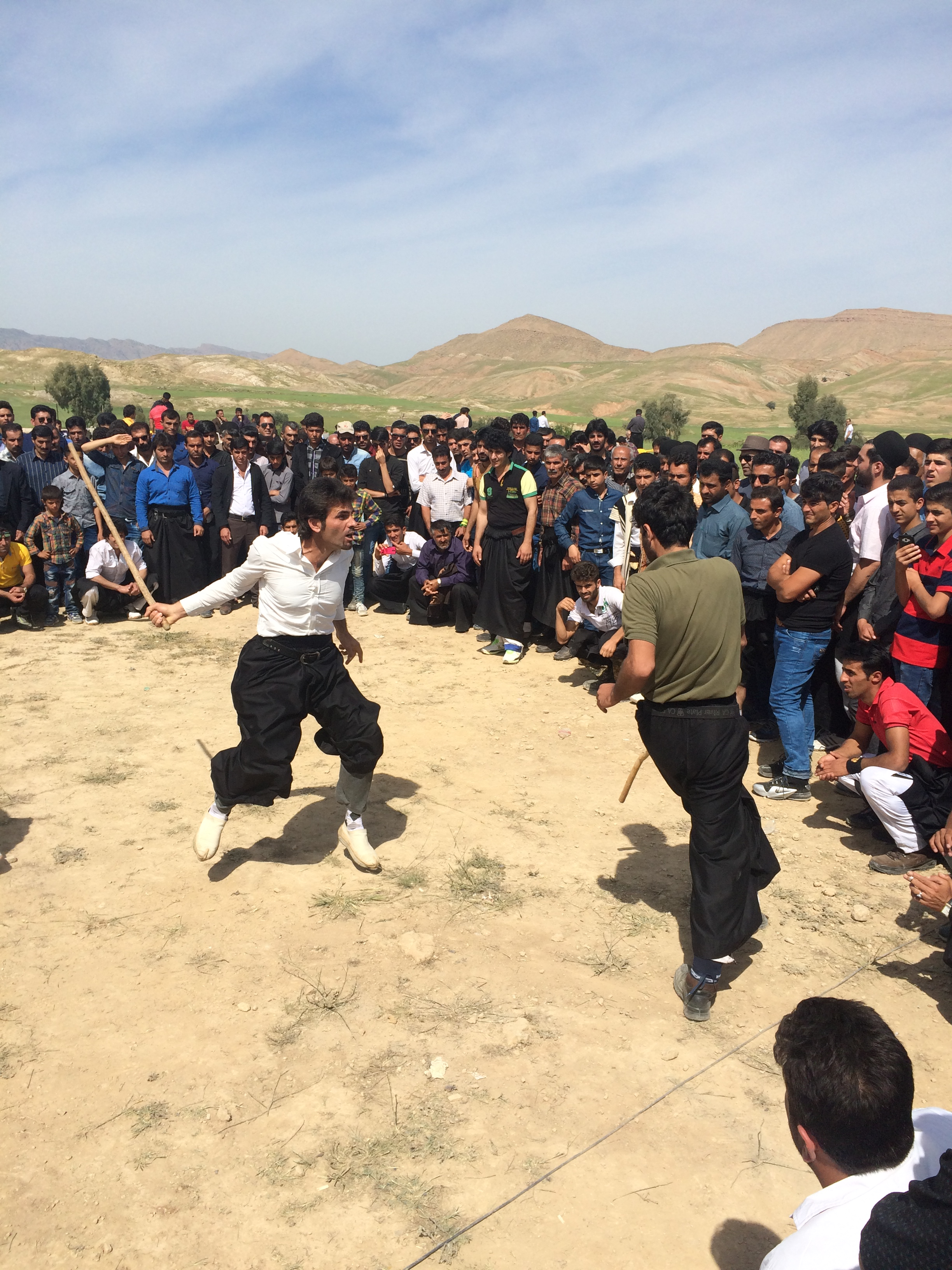
Chub-bazi in Andika

Choobazi is one of the Lorry dances and mostly common among "Bakhtiari lorr" and some common among villagers' and nomadic of Lorestan and is often implemented accompanied by dancing at weddings. The number of Choobazi players is two and the game includes two timber means a timber approximately one and a half meters and a little shorter than that. One player takes longer wood stick and others shorter and attack and defense against each other. The players try to dance with music of drum during the game, a person who has obtained a shorter stick attacks to the holder of the long stick and at first, dances a few laps before entering his stick and suddenly attacks to long stick holder. Long stick holder must defends himself. Attacker screams loud during his attack and try to undermine opponent's morale."Choobbaz" should only play by swinging the bat and yelling and threatening the opponent (no blow to the opponent). Attacker holds the stick in front of his face during attack and spins while beating on opponent's stick and then beats on his stick by contemplating his legs. The attacker is allowed to beat one time (it's not important to heat the opponent's stick), then the player who has the longer stick, grabs the shorter stick and another person takes the longer one. Game continues the same until the end.

Sometimes it may be a woman or a man to play. Someone who is skillful in the game and can rotate the playing field a few rounds without fatigue, is called stunting doer ("Shirin kar").
