= Javānmardi =

Persian word

Javānmardi (Persian: جوانمردی) is a Persian word which refers broadly to the ideological or philosophical underpinnings of an ethical system dominated by altruism, magnanimity and liberality linked to chivalry, and particularly spiritual chivalry. It is a concept usually discussed within Sufi contexts.

== Luti and Dash mashti ==
The lutis (Persian: لوتی lūtī) were a unique type of masculine men with roots from the Persian Sufi brotherhoods, ayyārs, and futuwwa ideas in 15th-19th century Persia. They had distinct rites, attitudes, clothing, and traits, most notably practicing Pahlevani and zoorkhaneh rituals. Their spiritual and martial model of masculinity was javānmardi, which means the state of being javānmard. Fellow lufti ayyār members were considered to be Dash mashti (or "Fellow bro(ther)s"), towards whom you have a commitment. They also consumed wine and even read Iranian poetry like Ferdowsi.

In late 19th century, a unifying national Persian masculine gender identity was gradually formed during the political and social developments and modernization/Westernization in late Qajar (1785-1925), particularly during the Iranian Constitutional Revolution (1905-1911), and first Pahlavi periods (1925-1941), which came into conflict with the ideals, norms, traits, and appearance of the lutis; the latter gradually became menacing, counter-normative, deviant, anxiety-provoking, chaotic, and violent.

== In popular culture ==
Dash Mashti was an influential subgenre of the Iranian cinema that embodied javanmardi ideals and ideas. Most of these films were produced in 1950s in Iran. The best example is considered the 1971 movie Dash Akol.

Iranian cinema has been key in shaping contemporary portrayals of Iranian men, blending traditional concepts like javanmardi with modern influences. Nacim Pak-Shiraz's analysis explores how filmfarsi redefined masculinity, empowered marginalized men, and reflected women's roles in both mainstream and alternative narratives.

== In modern Iran ==
In modern times the concept indicates an idealized configuration of masculinity in Iran. Some historical actors are considered representative of the javanmardi-ethos paradigmatically. The merchant Tayyeb Hajj Reza'i (1912-1963) is nowadays remembered as the "javanmard-e bozorg", i. e. the "great ideal man".
