= Jogo do pau =

Portuguese and Galician martial art

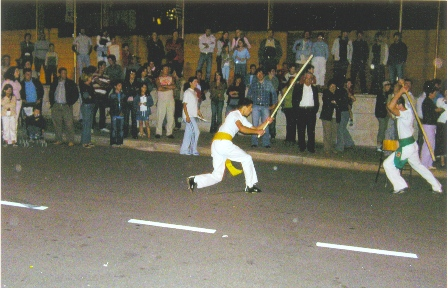
- Demonstration of 'jogo do pau' on a Portuguese street during a festival
- Also known as: Xogo do pau (Galicia) 葡萄牙棍術, 棍弄 or 棍戲 (Macau)
- Focus: Weapons (sticks)
- Hardness: Semi-contact
- Country of origin: Portugal
- Olympic sport: No

Jogo do pau, 'lit. stick game' (IPA: [ˈʒogu du ˈpaw]) is a Portuguese, Galician and Macanese martial art which originated from Northern regions of Minho, Alto Douro, Trás-os-Montes, Pontevedra and Ourense, focusing on the use of a staff (small wooden pole) of fixed measures and characteristics. Broadly defined as a Portuguese martial art of traditional folk origin, Jogo do Pau is a form of fencing with specific characteristics, where a stick (pau, Lat. etym:pālus), preferably made of wood, served as a weapon.

It was used for self-defense and also to settle feuds and matters of honour between individuals, families, and villages. While popular in the northern mountains, it was little known elsewhere, and those who did practice it were taught by masters from the North of Portugal and Galicia.

== History ==
Amid a conflict between nobles and liberals in the 1830's, the latter were forbidden from carrying or wearing swords to prevent duels or any other belligerent acts. In response, liberals embraced staff (bastão) combat, a practice that extended its influence across Portugal, reaching both the working and upper classes. Many Portuguese migrants skilled in these methods introduced this art to Brazil.

The popularity of this martial art was partly due to the demeanor of the northern folk, who valued personal and family honor enough to kill. It was also due in no small part to the relative ease of obtaining a staff as well as the versatility of such a tool: a staff or stick was almost universally present, used as a support for the long daily walks, to help crossing rivers, used by shepherds to protect the cattle from wild animals, and so on. There are references to this martial art being used by the guerrillas against the troops of Napoleon that were occupying Lisbon during the Peninsular War.

=== Origin ===
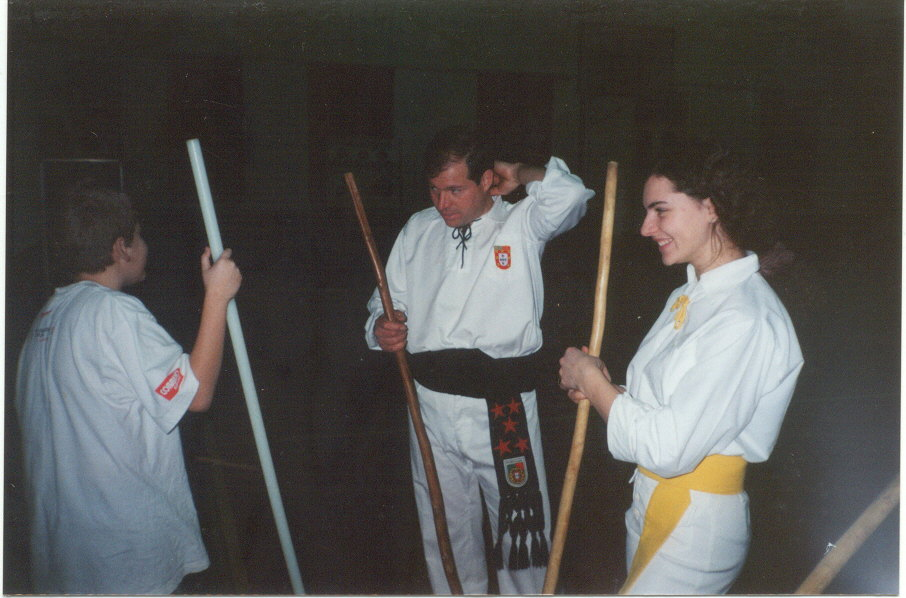
Monteiro with young students

The origins of the jogo do pau are believed medieval civil techniques of combat, used in times of war by foot soldiers who were often peasants, unable to afford weapons other than wooden poles. Evidence of this was first recorded in reports on the Battle of Aljubarrota of 1385, during the reign of John I of Portugal. This technique was incorporated into horseback riding in the medieval book A ensinança de bem cavalgar em toda a sela, 'lit. (The art of being a good horseman on any saddle') by Edward I of Portugal (1391–1438).

The concept bears similarities with the medieval French bâton de combat, the peasant version (usually from chestnut wood sticks) of the subsequent, and more gentile Canne de combat. There could however be a much older common link to the French, Portuguese, Breton, and Irish shillelagh traditional wood stick-fighting as all of these were once Celtic regions. This distinct Portuguese martial art, developed not in urban areas more open to foreign influences, but in Galicia and the rural mountainous regions of continental Portugal.

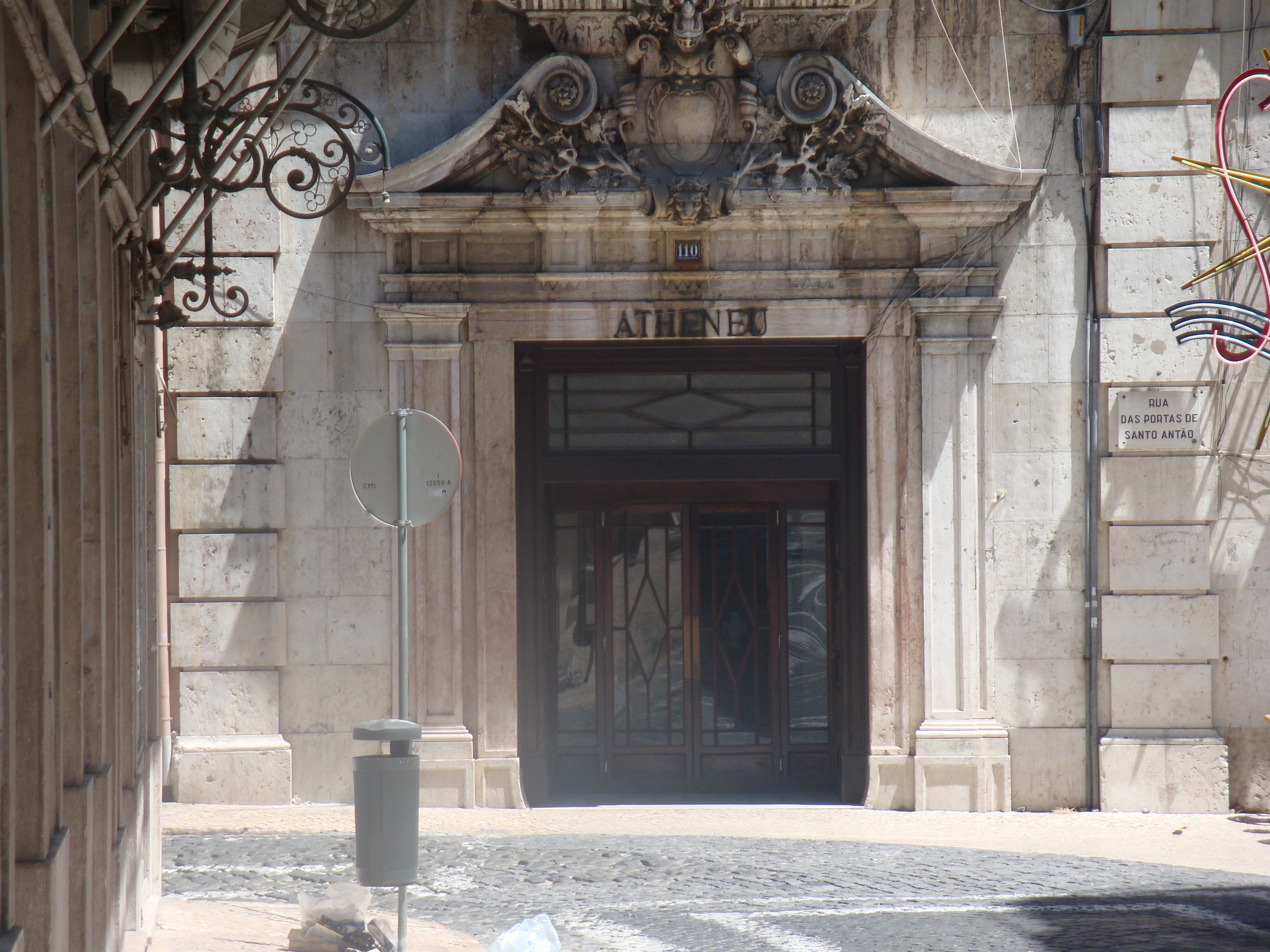
Atheneu façade

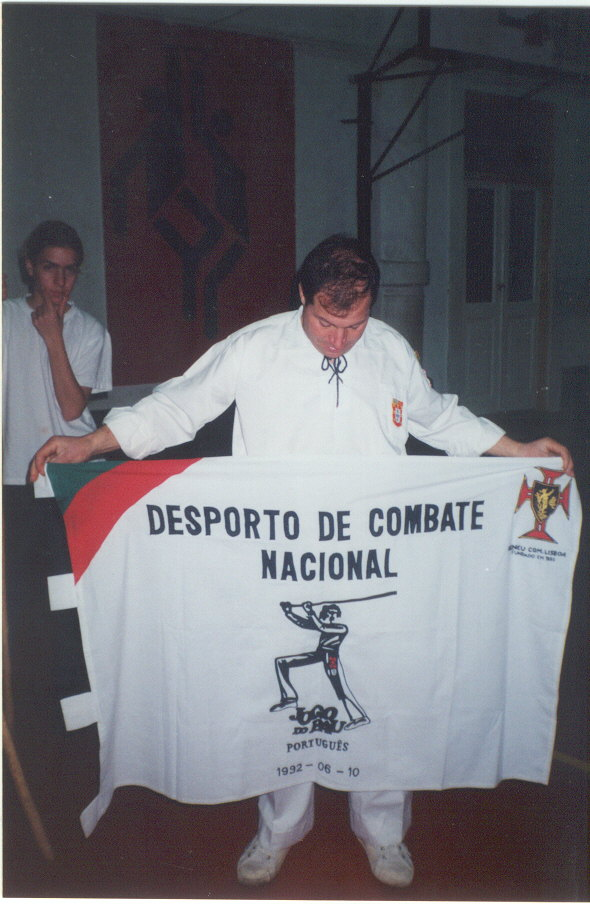
The flag of the ancient school of jogo do pau in Ateneu

During the 19th century, jogo do pau was brought to Lisbon by northern masters, resulting in an amalgamation with the technique of the Gameirosabre, growing into a sports competition, removed from actual combat. It was practiced in clubs such as the Ginásio Clube Português and the Atheneu Commercial de Lisboa.

== Modern practice ==
In the 20th century, the practice of jogo do pau suffered a significant decline due to the migrations from rural areas to the cities and the greater ease in access to firearms. The players born between 1910 and 1930 were the last generation to experience the sport still thriving. The memories of this generation provided a continuity in the 1970s, when the sport was revived. The driving force of this revival was Pedro Ferreira, followed by his student Nuno Curvello Russo, who dedicated his life's ambition to jogo do pau, frequently visiting the North of Portugal, getting acquainted with surviving variants there, especially with the school of Cabeceiras de Basto. He studied at the Ateneu Comercial de Lisboa, whose master is now Manuel Monteiro.

Today although relatively small, the sport has been revitalised and maintains a number of practitioners organized in two federations: the Federação Portuguesa de Jogo do Pau and the Federação Nacional do Jogo do Pau Português. Although originally from the northern regions of Minho, Alto-Douro, and Trás-os-Montes, this art is also practised in Lisbon, the Azores and Madeira islands, and outside of Portugal sporadically in Galicia, Spain and Macau.

Often referred to in Portugal as national fencing, this has been revived less as warlike technique and more of a sport, combining tradition and moderate pedagogical processes. While adhering to cultural heritage, the use of traditional village suits and belts/shashes adapted to contemporary environments, has been reinstated in some schools.

== See also ==
- Canne de combat
- Shillelagh
- Penn Bahz
- Juego del palo
- Ball de bastons
- Jōdō
- Historical European Martial Arts

== Literature ==
- Desch-Obi, Thomas J. (2008). Fighting for Honor: The History of African Martial Art Traditions in the Atlantic World. University of South Carolina Press. ISBN 978-1-57003-718-4.
- Preto, Luis (2013). Jogo do Pau: The ancient art & modern science of Portuguese stick fighting, 2nd. Ed. CreateSpace. ISBN 978-1480228146.
