= Fight with Cudgels =

Painting by Francisco de Goya

- Duelo a garrotazos (Spanish)
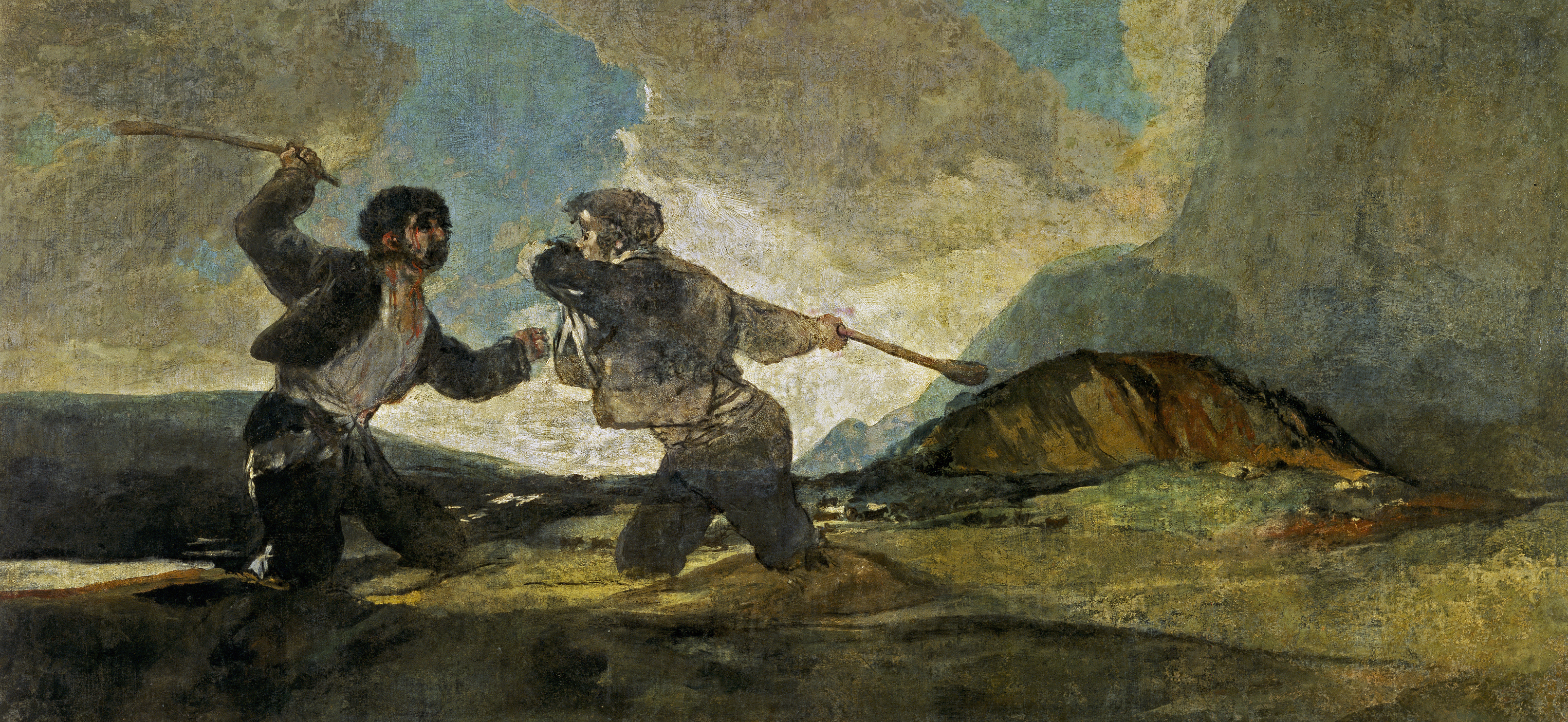
- Artist: Francisco Goya
- Year: c. 1820–1823
- Medium: Oil mural transferred to canvas
- Dimensions: 123 cm × 266 cm (48 in × 105 in)
- Location: Museo del Prado, Madrid

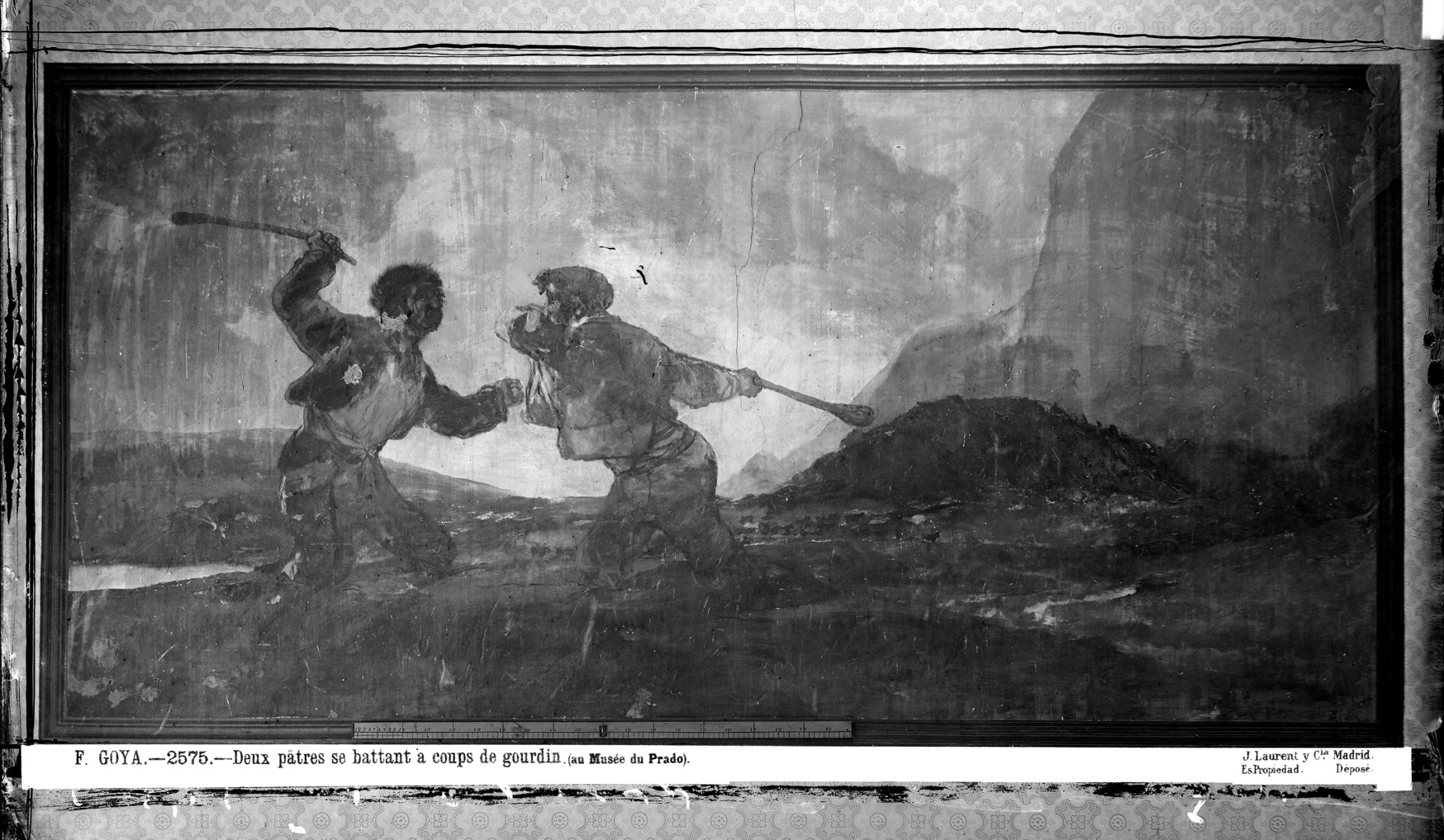
Photograph by Jean Laurent, taken around 1874 before the transfer to canvas. Though the lower legs are obscured, Charles Yriarte, who viewed the paintings at the Quinta, interpreted that the duelists fought on a grass field, not knee-deep in mud.

Fight with Cudgels (Spanish: Riña a garrotazos or Duelo a garrotazos), called The Strangers or Cowherds in the inventories, is the name given to a painting by Spanish artist Francisco Goya, now in the Museo del Prado, Madrid. Goya did not give names to his Black Paintings — these names are courtesy of art historians. One of the series of Black Paintings Goya painted directly onto the walls of his house sometime between 1820 and 1823, it depicts two men fighting one another with cudgels, as they seem to be trapped knee-deep in a quagmire of mud or sand.

In 1819, Goya purchased a house on the banks of the Manzanares near Madrid named Quinta del Sordo ("Villa of the Deaf Man"). It was a small two-story house that was named after a previous occupant who had been deaf, although Goya had also been left deaf after contracting a fever in 1792. Between 1819 and 1823, when he moved to Bordeaux, Goya produced a series of 14 works, which he painted with oils directly onto the walls of the house. Fight with Cudgels had been situated in the upper room of Quinta del Sordo.

== Interpretations ==
The traditional interpretation has been a fight of two commoners fighting in a desolate place trapped knee-deep.

The British researcher Nigel Glendinning had already remarked on the differences between the final detail of the Black Paintings and the detail documented by Jean Laurent, before the transfer from the wall of Goya's home. By the end of 2010, another study of the Laurent images by Carlos Foradada, a painter and teacher of Art History, restated that Goya painted the duelists standing in high grass rather than knee-deep in mud. The failure in the transfer caused the loss of large areas of the painting, which was then concealed below the knees. This favored the interpretation of the interred legs.

According to Francisco-Xavier de Salas Bosch, Goya may have been referencing an allegory (number 75) that appears in the work by Diego de Saavedra Fajardo, the emblem book Empresas Políticas [Political Maxims], Idea de un príncipe político cristiano, which contained a hundred short essays on the education of a prince. The allegory referred to the Greek myth of Cadmus and the dragon's teeth. By the instructions of Athena, Cadmus sowed the dragon's teeth in the ground, from which there sprang a race of fierce armed men, called Spartoi ("sown"). By throwing a stone among them, Cadmus caused them to fall upon one another until only five survived, who assisted him in building the Cadmea (citadel) of Thebes.

Saavedra used this imagery to discuss how some rulers stir up discord to establish peace in their kingdoms ultimately. Goya's use of this allegory may have referred to the policies and politics of Ferdinand VII.

== See also ==
- List of works by Francisco Goya
- Stick-fighting
