= Futuwwa =

Arabic term for "young-manliness" or "chivalry"

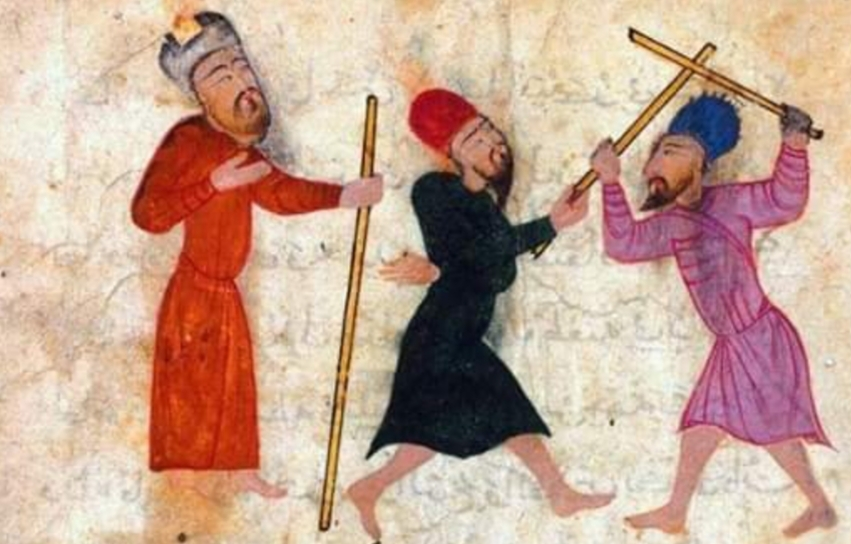
a depiction of Futuwwas

Futuwwa (Arabic: فتوة, "young-manliness") was a conception of adolescent moral behavior around which myriad institutions of Medieval confraternity developed. With characteristics similar to chivalry and virtue, these communal associations of Arab men gained significant influence as stable social units that exerted religious, military, and political influence in much of the Islamic world.

== History and development ==
=== Origins ===
In its most literal sense, Futuwwa described the quality of being young. It was not until the eighth century C.E. that the word came to represent something like a moral code. The evolution of the word, from adjective to moral framework, was driven by a melding of and Islamicization of Persian and Arab traditions.

The spread of Islam was accompanied by the spread of a definition of the ideal Arab man, or fatā. Even in the Pre-Islamic era, this theme constituted a popular form of poetry that revolved around the personage of Ḥātim aṭ-Ṭā’ī, a famous Arab poet renowned for his generosity. At-Ṭā’ī reappears in early Futuwwa literature as a pre-Islamic ancestor to the chivalrous moral code that would later find expression in similar Islamic icons, namely Alī ibn Abū Ṭālib. Over time, this poetry would confer upon fāta, an epithet employed in the Quran to celebrate the righteousness of such figures as Yūsuf and Ibrahīm in the Sleepers of the Cave, a deeper moral significance. The development of an Arabic notion of the ideal man was further influenced by the Persian concepts of Javānmardi, a similar system of ideals closely linked to Sufi orders.

Among the earliest attempts at crystallizing the concept of futuwwa into literary form was a ninth century treatise by Abū al-Fātik linking the behavior of fatā with expectations governing behavior at the table. The associations of young men alluded to in al-Fātik's code, precursors to more formally constituted brotherhoods of later centuries, are first described in the Kitāb al-Aghānī, a ninth century anthology of poems and songs from the Arab world. Though it does not reference futuwwa explicitly, the poem describes a novel class of young men in Syria that regularly congregated together for drink and merriment and was critical of their predilection for disregarding the laws of the local governor. This explicit standardization of a previously nebulous conception of moral righteousness set the tone for more expansive futuwwa codes that began to develop between the 11th and 14th centuries C.E.

=== Caliphal reform ===
By the 12th century, the concept of futuwwa and organizations founded around its prescriptions spread throughout the Islamic world. A testament to its rapid rise in influence over the region, The Caliph An-Nāṣir li-Dīn Allāh's approved of and supported futuwwa. In 1182, al-Nasir was initiated into the ranks of the futuwwa, donning their vestments and drinking salt water in the name of its head Shaykh. Over time, the Caliph would use futuwwa as a clever means of asserting caliphal power through religious hierarchy rather than regional power. He was particularly known to distribute the vestments of futuwwa to regional leaders in an assertion of his higher-rank. Though the original text of the Caliph's 1207 reform measures have been lost, reproductions describe an attempt at restructuring and institutionalizing futuwwa in a manner beneficial to Caliphal authority. One 1221 mission to Anatolia, for example, sought to propagate this reform to the Islamic frontier. Its contents include such measures as a strengthening of the important of the distribution of the trousers of futuwwa by the caliph and an assertion of Caliphal responsibility in protecting buildings of the futuwwa.

Ultimately, the Caliph's appropriation of futuwwa led to the flowering of literature regarding the institution. Instead of taming the brotherhoods into monolithic units of caliphal control, however, the reform measures spawned an unprecedented diversity of thought regarding the organizations, and new innovations and interpretations abounded. It continued for some time after the death of its founder. Al-Nasir's attempt to restructure the institution in a manner consolidating his control over Islamic society.

== Futuwwa in Anatolia ==
=== Overview ===
"Akhism" is a term used by scholars to distinguish the futuwwa organizations of Anatolia from other futuwwa associations throughout the rest of the Middle East. By the time of Ibn Battuta's travels through Asia-Minor in the early 14th century, Akhiyat al-Fityan, or Brotherhood of Youth, existed in every major city in Anatolia. These Akhi Brotherhoods rose to prominence in the 13th century in the wake of the fall of the Great Seljuk Empire. In the absence of a powerful central authority, these brotherhoods would exercise a stabilizing religious, political, economic, and military presence in Anatolia.

=== Structure and membership ===
When Ibn Battuta travelled through Anatolia, he regularly stayed in Akhi lodges and marveled at the hospitality of his hosts. The leader of each brotherhood would furnish a hospice where, at the end of the workday, members would pool money together communally for the acquisition of food and drink. When travelers, like Battuta, were in town, they entertained them with elaborate banquets, religious debate, and song and dance. While the membership of these organizations would eventually skew heavily towards the merchant class, many still boasted a diverse membership. In fact, it is likely that in the predominantly agrarian population of Anatolia, most brotherhoods would not have been able to compose itself of members of solely a single trade.

==== Religious ====
In many ways, the religious fabric of the Akhis was enhanced by the marked proliferation of Sufi dervishes throughout Anatolia, concomitantly with the decline of Byzantine control and the rise of Akhi political clout Predominantly Sufi in nature, many within the Akhyiat were fervent in their religious expression, engaging in esoteric rituals, song, and dance. Theologian Akhis were integrated into the upper stratum of the Ottoman Empire under Orhan. At the beginning of the Ottoman dynasty, many Christians lived in their territory. Erudite Akhis were deployed by Orhan to publicly debate Christian theologians in hopes of swaying the local population to the side of Islam.

Following the political decline of the Akhiyat al-Fityan, many of its more spiritual members would join such dervish orders as the Mevlevis, Khalvetis, and Bektashis.

==== Military ====
The Akhiyat al-Fityan's relationship with warfare varied widely according to local conditions. Within the cities, the brotherhoods proved fiercely loyal to their cities, and would often come to their defense against aggressors Where some brotherhoods unified peacefully around trade or Sufism, others were closely linked to those who conducted Ghazw, or holy war, raiding towns and villages in the Dar al-Harb and collecting significant sums of loot. These alliances both enriched the akhi through combat acceptable under Sharia Law.

==== Political ====
Though Turkish expansion into Western Anatolia occurred rapidly following the collapse of Byzantine control there in the 13th century C.E., Seljuk and Mongol policies of decentralization allowed Akhi brotherhoods to exert significant influence. Maintaining this system required a vast network of Seljuk patronage, ensuring the loyalty of outlying groups through the construction of public works, akhi and dervish lodges, and tombs. Within the cities, the brotherhoods sought to preserve order and stability, in some cases operating as diplomats with foreign leaders and the central state to maintain peace. .

==== Socioeconomic ====
The necessity of Turkish artisanal unions to compete with Byzantine craftsmen in Asia Minor contributed greatly to the establishment of brotherhoods unified by common trades, and the marked influence of the Akhi Brotherhood on the Ottoman Empire can be seen in the integration of the futuwwa tradition into the Ottoman guild system. Although the Akhi Brotherhood was originally open to men of varying professions, as the Ottomans consolidated their rule in Anatolia, the organization was reconstituted into guilds of artisans and merchants. During the Ottoman reign, the government did not train the public in matters of vocation. Vocational training was conducted by guilds, and "Futuwwa treatises were used as the constitutions of the guilds of the Ottoman Empire."

=== Relationship with Ottoman state and political demise ===
At the time of the formation of the Ottoman state in the 14th century, the Akhi Brotherhood was a massively influential institution throughout Anatolia. As independent units of local influence, however, imperial authority understood the potential of the Akhi Brotherhoods to become seditious hotbeds of revolutionary agitation and religious heresy. Accused of conspiracy against the state, many brotherhoods found themselves absorbed by an aggressively expansionist Ottoman state, however, under Murad I and his successor, Bayzid the Thunderbolt, Akhi discontent and resentment towards imperial attempts at control ultimately led to open rebellion. As imperial influence increased, these rebellions were put down with greater and greater ease and the Akhiyat al-Fityan more fully embraced their economic or religious underpinnings, absorbing into guilds or Sufi orders.

== Futuwwa in Armenia ==
As early as the 12th century, Armenian priest Matthew of Edessa described Armenian associations of youth were described resembling what would later become the Akhi Brotherhoods of Anatolia. In his journal, the priest chronicles an altercation between a group of eighty youth fishmongers and local townspeople. The text captures a myriad of behaviors that closely parallel their Akhi counterparts, notably drinking, dancing, and physical combat.

In the wake of Seljuk occupation, Armenian people outside of the Kingdom of Cilicia found themselves subject to Islamic law. Through cross-cultural exchange or innovation themselves, the Armenian brotherhoods grew increasingly secular. So much so, in fact, that in 1280 the Armenian Church attempted a reform effort not dissimilar to the futuwwa reform of the Caliph al-Nasir. Constitutions similar to those governing Islamic futuwwa groups were soon penned, notably by the priest-poet Hovhannes Erznkatsi.

Structurally and functionally, the Armenian brotherhoods shared many similarities with other futuwwa groups. Like the Akhis of the Akhiyat al-Fityan, the Armenian brotherhoods were led by a manktawag, who carried both religious and secular influence. There were also many parallels between Hovhannes' writings and those of Shihab al-Din Umar al-Suhrawardi (1144-1234), the man who wrote the first Muslim futuwwa treatises in Anatolia. First, religion made up the foundation of the futuwwa. Hovhannes wrote about the importance of religious practices like thrice daily prayer. He also outlined regulations for "opening and closing bodily parts." Most importantly, however, association was impossible for non-Christians. Second, Hovhannes stressed that it was essential for members of the brotherhood to support each other. For example, the treatises stated that members should pool their profits and live off of them. This practice especially bore a striking resemblance to Muslim Akhi Brotherhoods, where members would bring their daily earnings to the guild's lodge for its improvement and for providing hospitality for guests. Finally, a major goal of the futuwwa was to maintain the moral behavior of its members. Hovhannes wrote that it was important to have a strong body and soul that were like a well-organized city with "one fortification and five gates surrounding it." The five gates representing the eyes, ears, nose, and the hands and feet, which are all responsible for the senses. "All good and evil," Yovhannes argued, entered through these gates. Members needed to properly train and use their senses to protect themselves from sin. For example, the treatises mentioned the importance of chastity. If a member was married, he was advised to keep himself clean and far from "foreign" beds. Members were also discouraged from indulging in drinking wine, since it would lead them to bad behavior. The Armenian brotherhoods were commonly tied to a trade and loyally defended their cities and towns from invasion.

== Futuwwa in Egypt ==
The Futuwwas first appeared in Egypt during the Memluks era, in the time of Muhammad Ali. Cairo was split into eight districts including Sayyidah Zainab District, Azbakeya and Al-Darb al-Ahmar and every district had Futuwwas guarding it. After the British conquest of Egypt, their role was largely reduced in favour of a stronger centralised government and a powerful police force culminating in a law that was passed in 1906 banning the use of the Naboot, the main weapon of the Futuwwas and limiting the use and ownership of firearms. Despite losing much of their power and influence, the Futuwwas lingered on into the 1950s, resurfacing whenever the government was preoccupied such as during the World War I when they made a comeback, but then they slowly vanished completely.

== In media and literature ==
Futuwwas are a main subject in Arabic media and literature, novelist Naguib Mahfouz, Nobel Prize for Literature awardee was especially interested in them writing many novels about them including the Harafish and Children of Gebelawi, the futuwwa character was depicted many times in movies and series including the movie (El Fetewa) starring Farid Shawqi

== Historiography ==
Futuwwa became a topic for European orientalists after being mentioned in a work by Franz Taeschner. Later it was studied by Claude Cahen as a social phenomenon of medieval Iraq and Turkey.

== Modern reuse of the name ==
=== Use of the concept in Egypt ===
In modern-day Egypt, the term is used for youths who try to do quasi-chivalrous acts such as helping others resist intimidation by a rival group.

== Famous Futuwwas ==
=== Fahmy El-Feshawy ===
He was the Futuwwa of Khan el-Khalili and founder of El-Fishawy Café the oldest cafe still open in Egypt

=== Hamido the knight ===
He was a famous Futuwwa in Alexanderia, after the decline of his role he pursued a political career getting elected to represent Sayala a neighbourhood located in Bahary, he was given his nickname "the Knight" by Abbas II of Egypt after he defeated one of his servants in a wrestling match at Abbas's palace

=== Aziza Al Fahla ===
Sabha Ibrahim known for her nickname "Aziza Al Fahla" was a woman futuwwa which was uncommon, she was the futuwwa of Al-Darb al-Ahmar, known to be fierce in fights but kind to the people, she had 40 men working under her, she was known to defend the women of her neighbourhood, in a famous incident she and her men beat up drunk British soldiers who tried to break into a bathhouse and harras women, she encouraged the youth of her neighbourhood to train in Weightlifting training them herself, one of these young men was Hussein Moukhtar who went on to compete in the Olympics.

== See also ==
- Aman (Islam) or amān, assurance of security or clemency granted to enemies who seek protection
- Honor codes of the Bedouin
- Furusiyya, equestrian martial exercise of the Golden Age of Islam and the Mamluk period
- Ghazi, warrior who participated in military expeditions or raiding
- Izzat (honour), concept of honour in North India, Bangladesh and Pakistan applying across religions (Hindu, Muslim and Sikh)
- Javānmardi, Persian word almost synonymous to Arabic Futuwwa
