= Nguni stick-fighting =

South African martial art

- Also known as: Zulu stick-fighting
- Focus: Weaponry
- Country of origin: South Africa
- Creator: Various
- Famous practitioners: Shaka Zulu, Nelson Mandela
- Olympic sport: No

Nguni stick-fighting (also known as donga, or dlala 'nduku, which literally translates as 'playing sticks') is a martial art traditionally practiced by teenage Nguni herdboys in South Africa. Each combatant is armed with two long sticks, one of which is used for defense and the other for offense. Little armor is used. For up to five hours, players alternate between offense and defense to score points based on which body part is struck.

Although Nguni/Xhosa styles of fighting may use only two sticks, variations of Bantu/Nguni stick-fighting throughout Southern Africa incorporate shields as part of the stick-fighting weaponry. Zulu stick-fighting uses an isikhwili or attacking stick, an ubhoko or defending stick and an ihawu or defending shield.

The object is for two opposing warriors to fight each other to establish which of them is the strongest or the "Bull" (Inkunzi). In modern times this usually occurs as part of the wedding ceremony where warriors from the bridegroom's household and area welcome warriors from the bride's household and area to meet to "get to know each other", other groups of warriors may also be welcome to join in. Warriors do this by engaging in combat with one another. An "induna" or War Captain / Referee from each group of warriors keeps his crew in check and keeps order between fighters.

This tradition is one which arguably developed in societies, cultures and civilisations that used herding as part of their systems of survival; where there are cows, there are stick-fighters. The old regimental structures of the great uShaka KaSenzangakhona KaJama dominate current modern Zulu stick-fighting.

Film maker SiyaBonga Makhathini has directed the film "We Still are Warriors" which captures the essence of the modern-day Zulu stick-fighter, descendant of the kings of old.

Nelson Mandela practiced Nguni stick-fighting as a child, and it was featured on the Discovery and BBC reality TV show Last Man Standing. It has been featured in Season 1 of the television series Deadliest Warrior.

Nguni stick-fighting is resurfacing and attracting crowds despite being previously banned in some parts of South Africa.
