= Professional wrestling aerial techniques =

Aerial techniques, also called high-flying moves, are performance techniques used in professional wrestling for simulated assault on opponents. The techniques involve jumping from the ring's posts and ropes, demonstrating the speed and agility of smaller, nimble and acrobatically inclined wrestlers, with many preferring this style instead of throwing or locking the opponent.

Aerial techniques can be challenging for wrestlers to learn since they learn to trust the other performer, the nominal opponent, to either target the jump correctly or to safely catch their fall. Due to the risk of injury caused by these high-risk moves, some promotions have banned the use of some of them.

The next list of maneuvers was made under general categories whenever possible.

== Attacks ==
=== 187 ===
This move sees a wrestler jumping forward from an elevated position while holding a steel chair or other weapon, driving the weapon onto an opponent lying prone on the mat. This move was innovated by New Jack and named in reference to the prison slang term 187.

=== Diving chops ===
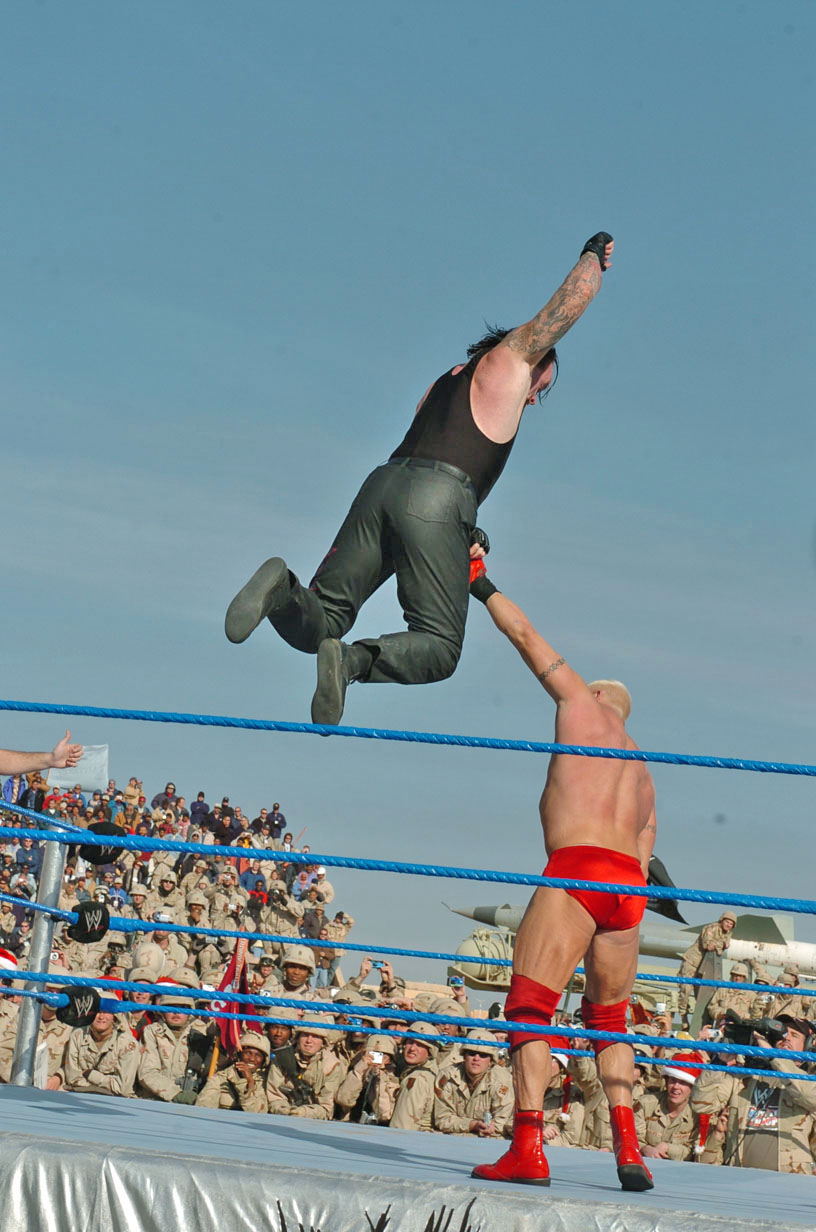
The Undertaker jumping down from the top rope to strike Heidenreich with Old School

==== Arm twist ropewalk chop ====
The wrestler takes hold of one of the opponent's wrists, twisting the arm into an arm wrench. The wrestler then climbs up the corner turnbuckles and takes a walk on the top rope before falling down striking the opponent's head, back, shoulder or nape with a chop. The move combination is better known as Old School. Invented by Don Jardine and popularized by The Undertaker, who was Jardine's protégé. Japanese wrestler Jinsei Shinzaki uses the move while praying as the Ogami Watari.

==== Diving overhead chop ====
Standing on the top turnbuckle, the attacking wrestler proceeds to jump in order to deliver an overhead chop to a standing opponent's head. This is one of the most recognizable signature moves performed by Manabu Nakanishi. This was also used by WWE Hall of Famer Tatanka as a signature move called, "Diving Tomahawk Chop".

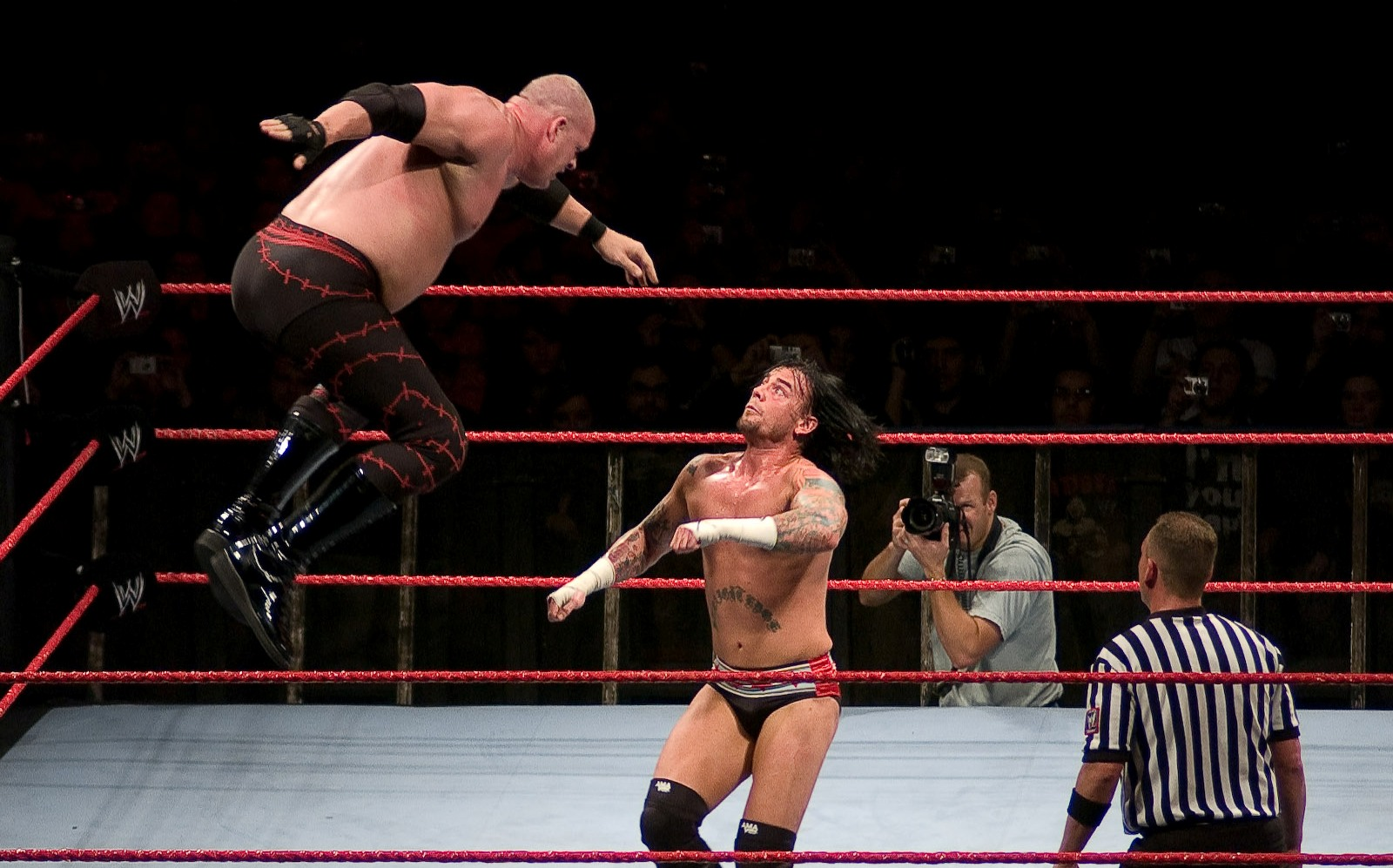
Kane performing a flying clothesline on CM Punk

=== Diving clothesline ===
The attacking wrestler jumps from an elevated position as extending their arm out from the side of the body and parallel to the ground, hitting the standing opponent in the neck or chest, knocking them over. A version of this move, called a flying lariat, involving the wrestler wrapping the attacking arm around the opponent's neck.

=== Diving double axe handle ===
Also known as diving axe handle, diving double axe handle smash, or diving double sledge, this is accomplished by jumping from the top turnbuckle to the mat or floor and striking the opponent with two fists held together in the fashion of holding an axe. This is usually done on a standing or rising opponent. A common variation sees the wrestler standing over the top rope, facing away from the ring. From this point, the wrestler jumps, twisting to face inside of the ring, and quickly clutching both fists together to strike the double axe handle. This move was popularized by Randy Savage.

=== Diving drops ===
==== Diving leg drop ====
Also called guillotine leg drop, this move sees a wrestler jumping from a raised platform landing the bottom side of one leg across the opponent's throat or chest. This move was popularized in the 1990s by the famed luchador, Psicosis. In the present day, this move is used as the finisher of TNA wrestler Johnny Dango Curtis (JDC), formerly known as Johnny Curtis and Fandango in WWE, calling this move Down and Dirty (formerly known as the Last Dance).

==== Moonsault leg drop ====
This variation sees the wrestler performing a moonsault but instead of landing on the opponent in a splash position, the wrestler continues the rotation to drive a leg across the downed opponent. 2 Cold Scorpio popularized this move as a signature called Drop The Bomb. Independent wrestler Ruckus has also used this as an occasional move.

==== Shooting star leg drop ====
The wrestler jumps forward from an elevated position following a full 360° or beyond rotation, driving a leg across the fallen opponent, Teddy Hart use this move as the "Hart Breaker".

==== Somersault leg drop ====
The wrestler, standing on an elevated position, jumps and flips forward to land one leg on the opponent lying beneath. This move can also be performed from a standing non-elevated position although this variation is quite rare. Booker T used this move during his time in WCW naming the move, Harlem Hangover. 2 Cold Scorpio also used a variation of this move as a finisher which sees him, while facing away from the supine opponent, utilizing a single corkscrew with the move, calling it the Tumbleweed.

==== Diving elbow drop ====
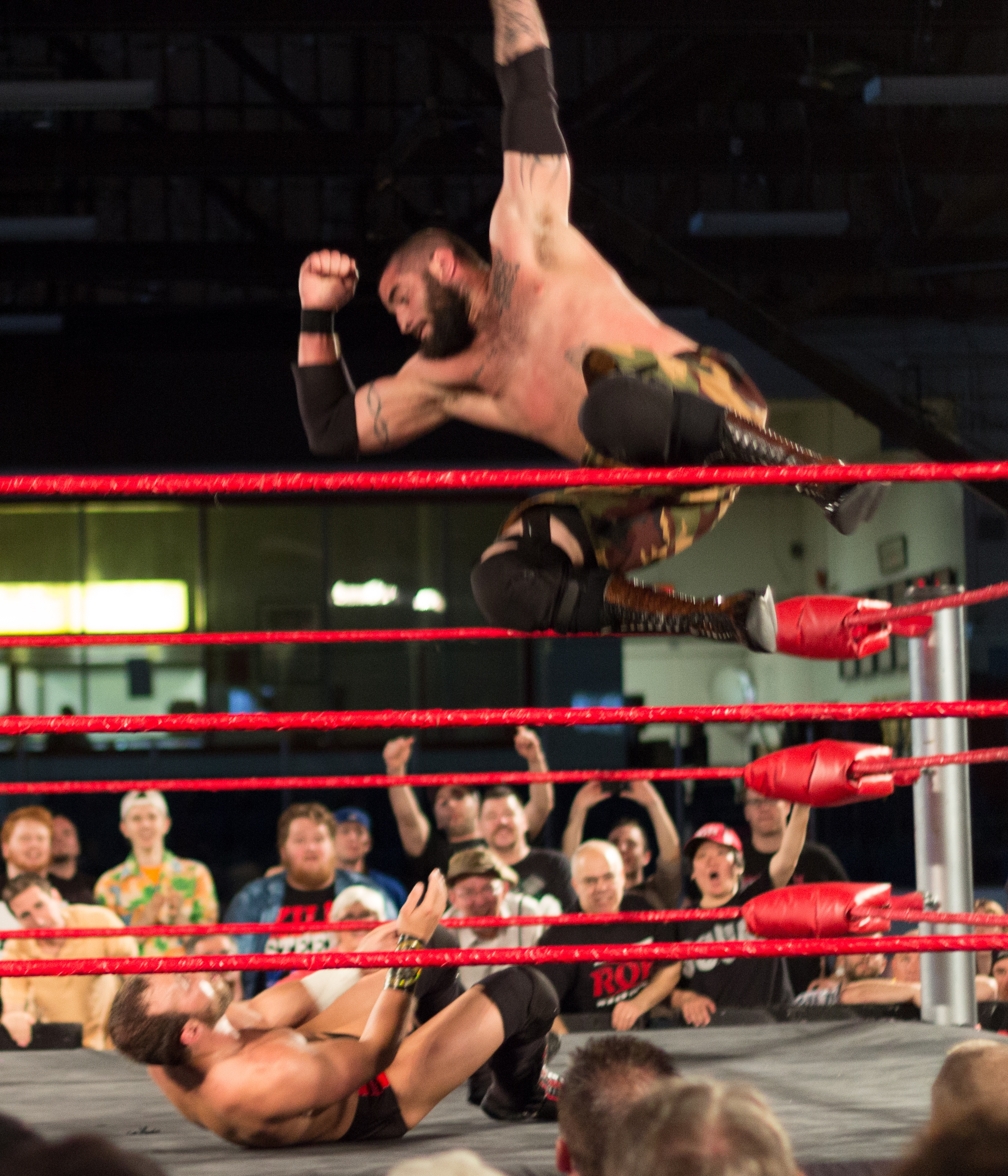
Mark Briscoe performing a diving elbow drop on Colin Delaney

Executed by diving onto a supine opponent with one elbow cocked, driving the elbow into the opponent as the wrestler falls on one of their sides. The move was popularized by "Macho Man" Randy Savage. Over the decades, the move has since been used by a number of WWE superstars such as CM Punk and Bayley, who both use the move as a homage to Randy Savage, and Kairi Sane who uses the move as her finisher, referring to it as the InSane Elbow.

==== Diving 450 elbow drop ====
The wrestler dives forward from an elevated position performing a 450 somersault landing on the supine opponent with the elbow drop. Independent wrestler Flip Kendrick has used the move. John Morrison uses a modified version of this move which sees him utilizing a diving cartwheel motion during the move and uses this as a finisher calling it the Countdown to IMPACT, IMPACT Elbow (using both names while in Impact Wrestling), and Thursday Night Delight respectively.

==== Diving back elbow drop ====
This less common variation sees a wrestler stand facing away from a standing or supine opponent and in an elevated position (usually the top turnbuckle). The wrestler then dives backwards to strike the opponent. Ted DiBiase has used this move against a supine opponent as a finisher.

==== Diving pointed elbow drop ====
The wrestler sits on the top turnbuckle with a foot on each second rope facing a supine opponent. The wrestler then leaps forward while clasping both forearms together, landing on their knees, driving an elbow into the opponent. It was used and popularized by Bret Hart and Stone Cold Steve Austin.

==== Shooting star elbow drop ====
This move sees a wrestler jumping forward from an elevated position followed by executing a mid-air backflip to land elbow first on an opponent lying on the mat, Teddy Hart use this move as the "Hart Attack 2.0".

==== Diving fist drop ====
A move in which a wrestler jumps down from the turnbuckle on an opponent, driving their fist into the opponent's head. While doing it, wrestlers have their front four knuckles out, and their thumb to the side. This move was popularized by Jerry Lawler as his finisher.

==== Diving headbutt ====
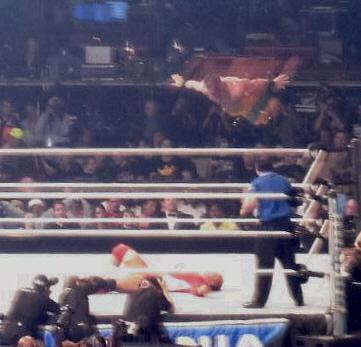
Chris Benoit performing a diving headbutt on MVP at WrestleMania 23

Also known as a Diving headbutt drop or a Flying headbutt, it is delivered from the turnbuckle with the wrestler leaping forward into the air head-first to fall and strike anywhere on the opponent's prone or supine body. The move was accidentally invented by Harley Race, who adapted it as a signature move and it was then further popularized by The Dynamite Kid, Chris Benoit, Bam Bam Bigelow, D-Von Dudley, Tomoaki Honma and recently Bryan Danielson and Chad Gable.

The wrestler will sometimes use this move with a swan diving motion by spreading their arms outwards while arching their legs backwards midair while performing the move. Benoit and Danielson are best known to use this technique.

Benoit also used a version of this move by simply falling forward off the turnbuckle, with his arms spread up and outwards, to hit an opponent at close range. Honma also uses this version that he calls the Kokeshi while keeping his arms to his sides.

This move, popular in lucha libre, can also be used to hit a standing opponent as demonstrated by Rey Mysterio who has used diving and springboard versions of this move earlier, and rarely at later parts in his career, as a signature and finisher.

After the Chris Benoit double-murder and suicide, the WWE banned the move as it was found that the move in general could cause severe brain damage.

==== Diving knee drop ====
A move in which a wrestler jumps from the top turnbuckle, top rope, or the apron, landing one knee across a supine opponent. There is also a variation where a wrestler jumps from the elevated position and lands both knees across the supine opponent, referred to as a diving double knee drop. Bob "Spark Plug" Holly used this as a finisher, calling it the Pitstop Plunge.

===== Meteora =====
This version of the diving double knee drop sees the attacker performing the maneuver from an elevated platform, jumping forward onto a standing or seated upright opponent with each knee striking both of their shoulders simultaneously. Springboard, slingshot, and standing or running versions of this move are also possible with the latter being used while the attacker is charging towards an opponent, against a charging opponent, or a combination of both. Innovated by CIMA, who has used both a springboard and top rope version as finishing maneuvers in Dragon Gate, and named it after the Greek landmark where he proposed to his wife. American wrestlers Sasha Banks and Matt Sydal also use it as a signature move, the latter having also performed in Dragon Gate.

===== Shooting star knee drop =====
This move sees the wrestler jumping forward from the second turnbuckle, executing a mid-air backflip, landing knee first on an opponent down all on fours. It is a finishing move used by "Speedball" Mike Bailey as Ultima Weapon.

=== Diving senton ===
This diving variation for a senton sees the wrestler landing back or buttocks first on the opponent's stomach or chest.

==== Backwards facing diving senton ====
The move sees an attacking wrestler jumping to the top turnbuckle or top rope facing away from the ring before falling down backwards onto the lying opponent. Popularized by Darby Allin who uses it as a finisher as the Coffin Drop. He is also known to use this move to hit a standing opponent.

==== 630° senton ====
The attacker on the top turnbuckle jumps and flips mid-air into a double front somersault to land sitting on the opponent below. It was innovated by Jack Evans and popularized by Ricochet who uses a corkscrew version of this move. Vikingo also use this move as his finish.

===== Corkscrew 630° senton =====
In this version, the wrestler facing away from the ring on the top turnbuckle performs a 180° mid-air turn while executing the maneuver. Jack Evans and Ninja Mack uses this move.

==== Diving seated senton ====
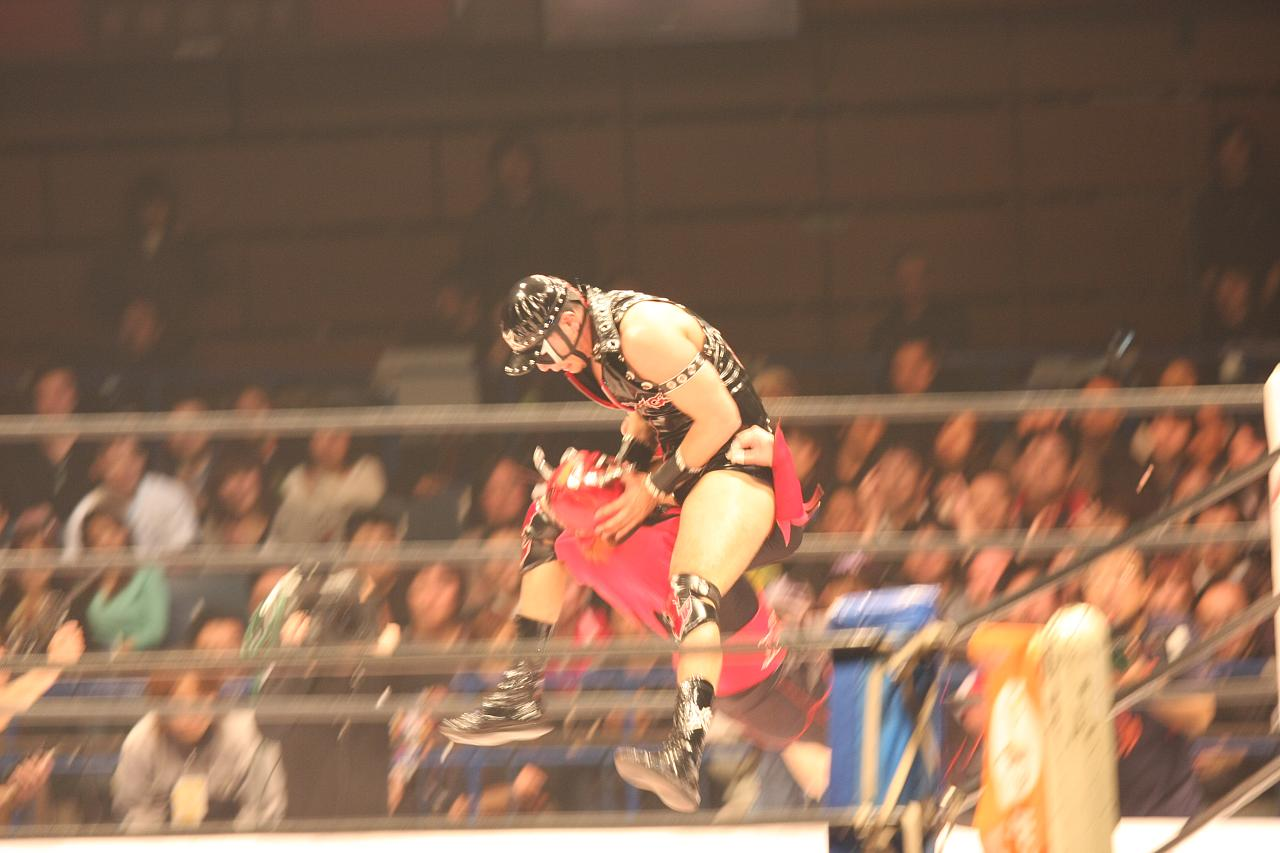
Razor Ramon HG performing a seated senton

This variant has the wrestler using the tailbone and lower back to fall in a seated position forcing a standing opponent to the mat rather than using their whole back. Performed by jumping forward off a raised platform or springboarding on to the opponent's shoulders, forcing them to the ground. This can also be performed onto an opponent prone or supine on the mat.

A variation of this move known as the Banzai Drop, popularized by Yokozuna and by Rikishi as the Rump Shaker, sees the wrestler standing over a fallen opponent next to the turnbuckle, then climbing up to the second rope and jumping down, landing on the opponent's stomach or chest.

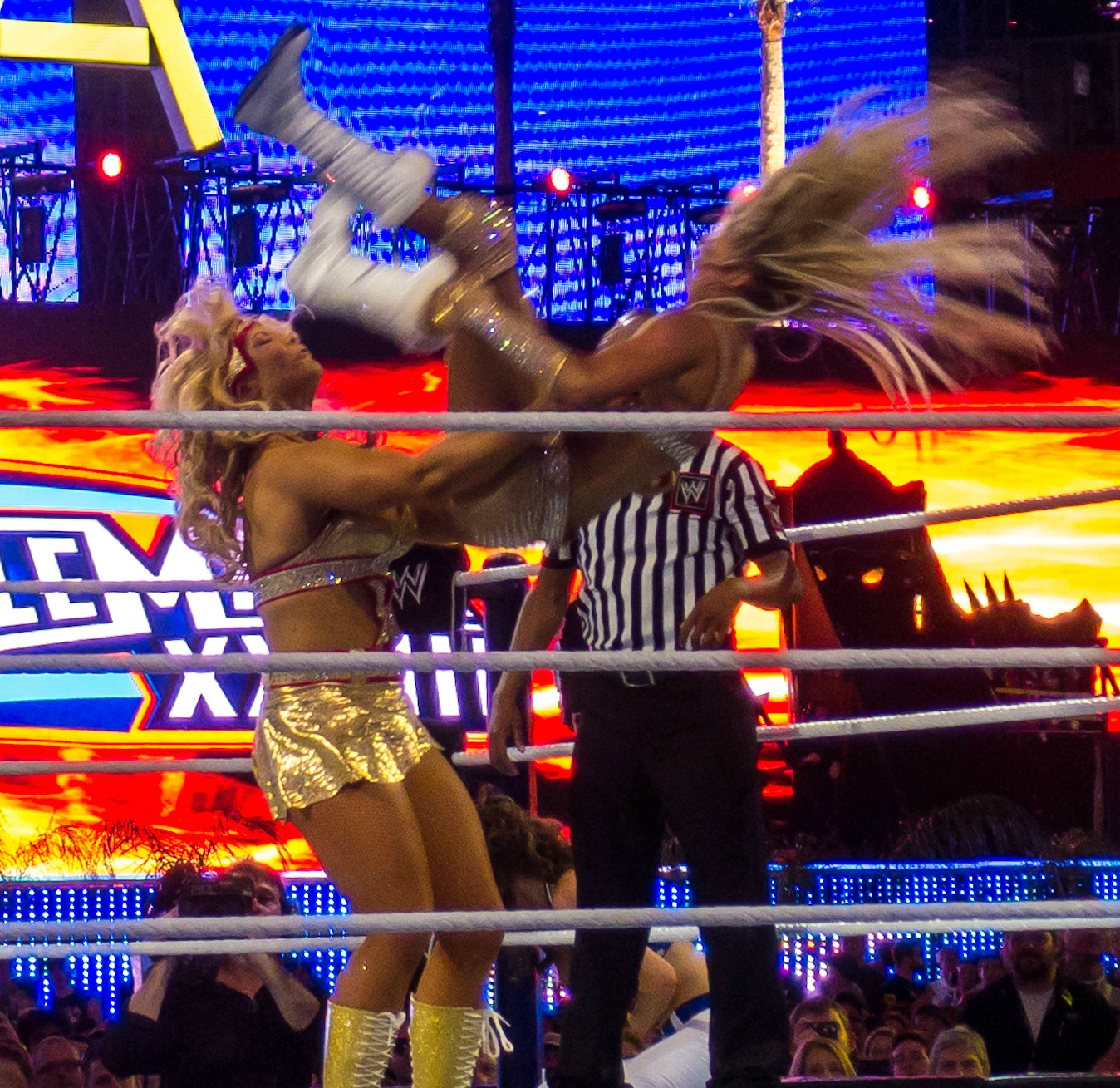
Kelly Kelly performing the Molly-go-round at WrestleMania XXVIII

===== Molly-Go-Round =====
This variant, which is technically described as a diving somersault seated senton is performed by flipping forward off a raised platform on to the shoulders of a standing opponent, forcing them to the ground into a pinning position. Innovated by Molly Holly. Tegan Nox uses this move.

==== Moonsault senton ====
The attacker jumps to the top turnbuckle or top rope facing away from the ring, and executes a moonsault, landing in an ordinary senton position. There is also a standing version of this move. Chad Gable use this move as his signature move.

==== Senton bomb ====
In this variation, the attacking wrestler executes a quick front somersault off the top turnbuckle, landing on the opponent back-first. Popularized by The Sandman and renaming it as Rolling Rock. The standing, running variation is known as a cannonball.

===== Corkscrew senton bomb =====
Another variant where the attacking wrestler facing to the ring does a 360° twist in the air before impact. A.J. Styles popularized this by calling it the Spiral Tap. Amazing Red use a backward version named "Infrared".

===== High-angle senton bomb =====
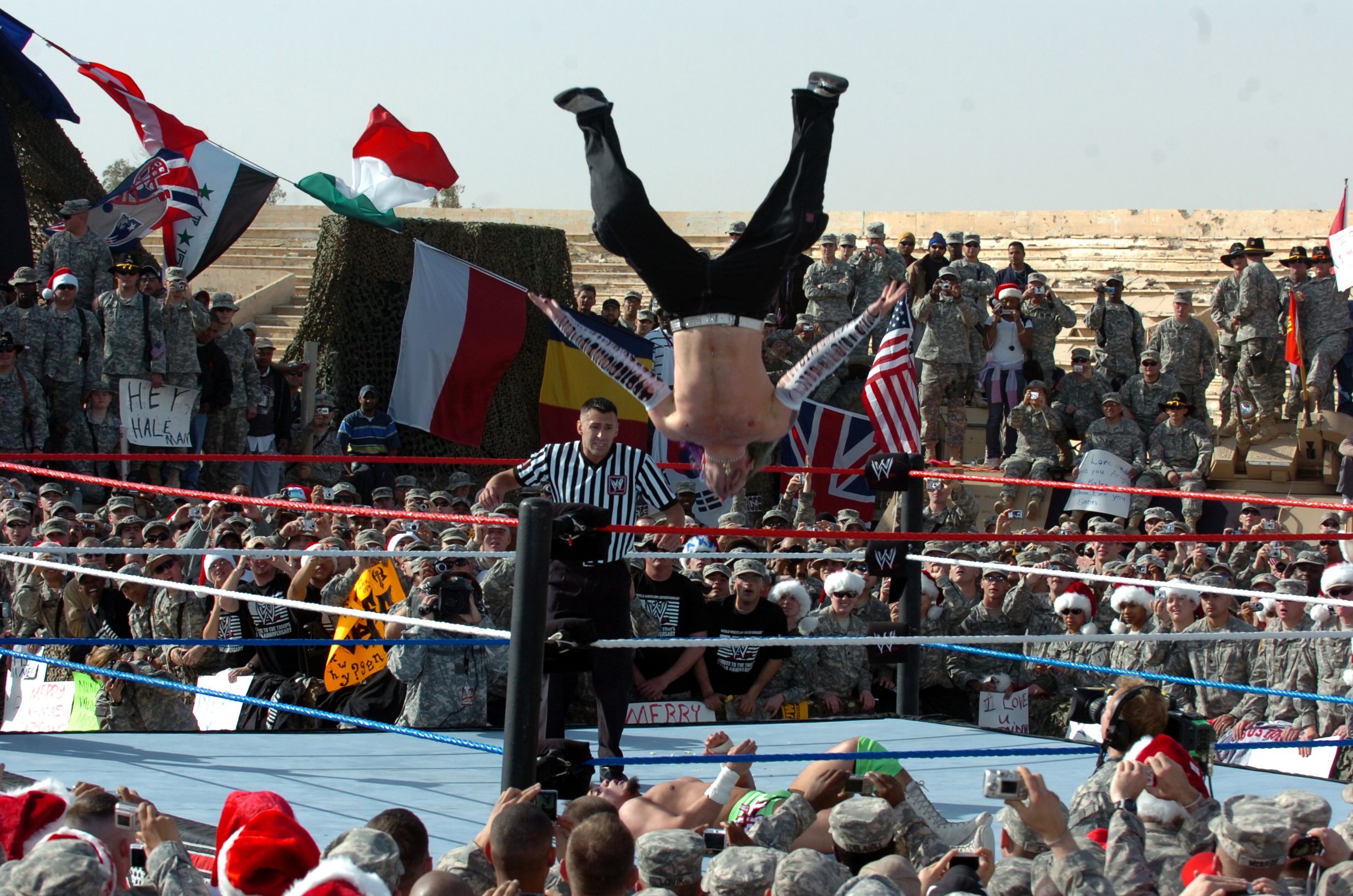
Jeff Hardy performing his Swanton Bomb (high-angle senton bomb) finisher to Carlito

A variant which sees a wrestler leaping off the top turnbuckle keeping the body straight and arms out-stretched, resembling a swan dive and then waiting until the last moment to execute the flip, so is just barely complete when the attacker impacts the opponent with upper back/shoulders. Invented by The Great Sasuke calling it Senton Atomico, Jeff Hardy popularized this move in North America, calling it the Swanton Bomb. It would be used by Kevin Owens, as well as British professional wrestler Amir Jordan, who calls the move Swanton Bombay.

===== Rolling senton bomb =====
Another variant where the attacking wrestler, facing away from the ring, does a 180° twist followed by the senton bomb. This was popularised by Jeff Hardy calling it Whisper in the Wind. This can be done with the opponent standing up or laying. Matt Riddle is also a notable user of this move, who calls it the Floating Bro.

==== Shooting star senton ====
Jumping forward from an elevated position, the attacking wrestler executes a mid-air backflip ending in a senton.

==== Sky Twister Press ====
Created by Chaparita ASARI, the Sky Twister Press sees the attacking wrestler somersault backwards from an elevated position, twisting their body around in mid air so as to land back first on the opponent. Some of ASARI's attempts would land chest first on her opponent, making the move effectively indistinguishable from a corkscrew moonsault.

=== Diving shoulder block ===
The wrestler dives from an elevated position tucking both arms in, and striking a standing opponent with one shoulder to the upper body.

==== Diving spear ====
A diving version of the takedown known as a spear. A wrestler will jump from a raised platform driving a shoulder into the torso as pulling both the opponent's legs, forcing them down to the mat.

=== Diving splash ===
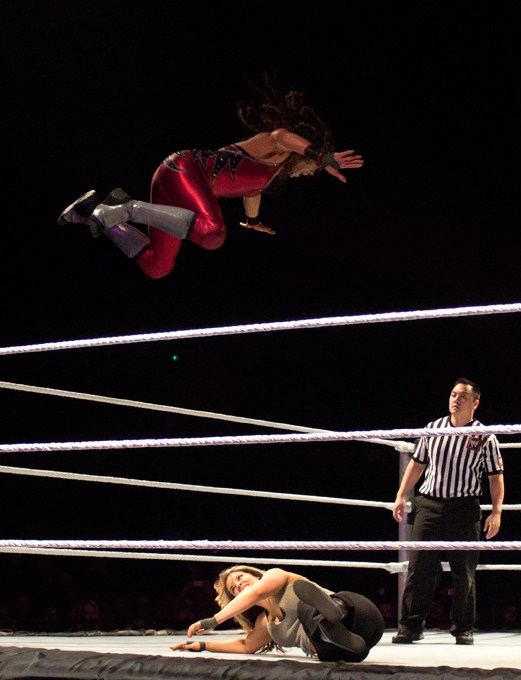
Tamina performing a Superfly Splash on Kaitlyn (diving splash)

This basic maneuver involves a wrestler jumping forward from a raised platform, landing stomach first horizontally across an opponent lying on the ground below. This move was popularized by Jimmy Snuka, naming it the Superfly Splash, for his “Superfly” gimmick, and is currently used by his daughter Tamina Snuka as a tribute to her father. The Usos also use this move as their finishers called the Uso Splash, and is also occasionally used by Solo Sikoa called Flying Solo. Bronson Reed also uses this as a finishing move called the Tsunami.

==== 450° splash ====
Also known as firebird splash, involves an attacker facing the ring from the top of the turnbuckles, then performing a "Rudolph" (front somersault with 1 1/2 rotations) to land the upper body's front on the opponent. This move was innovated by Scott Steiner in 1987 before 2 Cold Scorpio popularized the move in the 1990s. It can also be dangerous when it cannot be executed properly, as WWE previously banned it in 2005 after Juventud Guerrera broke Paul London's face before they allowed Justin Gabriel to use it in 2010. It is often used by high-flying wrestlers, but has also been used by mat-based wrestler Kris Statlander as her finisher, which is dubbed the Friday Night Fever (formerly known as Area 451).

===== Corkscrew 450° splash =====
The move was innovated and popularized by Hayabusa, who named it the Phoenix splash. The wrestler facing away from the ring on the top turnbuckle performs a 180° turn in mid-air while performing a 450° splash onto a lying opponent. Kota Ibushi and Rich Swann are notable users of the move.

===== Imploding 450° splash =====
Also known as flaming star press or inverted / reverse 450° splash, sees the attacking wrestler standing on the top turnbuckle facing away from the ring. Then jumping backwards executing a 450° splash inwards (facing the turnbuckle) onto a downed opponent on the mat. Mustafa Ali once used this move, naming it the 054.

===== Imploding corkscrew 450° splash =====
The attacking wrestler stands on the top turnbuckle facing towards the ring and performs a 180° turn in mid-air while performing a 450° splash inwards.

==== Corner slingshot splash ====
The wrestler places the opponent lying supine perpendicular to the turnbuckle. Then approaching to the turnbuckle in the same corner, grabbing a hold both hands on the top rope and climbing to the first or second rope, the wrestler bounces on the ropes before throwing both legs backwards and placing the body parallel to the mat as releasing the ropes, thus falling inwards and downwards to the ring squashing and pinning the opponent. Often referred to as Vader Bomb, for it was (Big Van) Vader who popularized it. Jack Swagger used a running variation as his signature in WWE, calling it a Swagger Bomb and is currently being used by Otis as the Dozer splash.

=== Moonsault ===
A wrestler executes a backflip and lands torso first on the opponent. A basic moonsault is generally attempted from the top turnbuckle, though myriad variations exist.

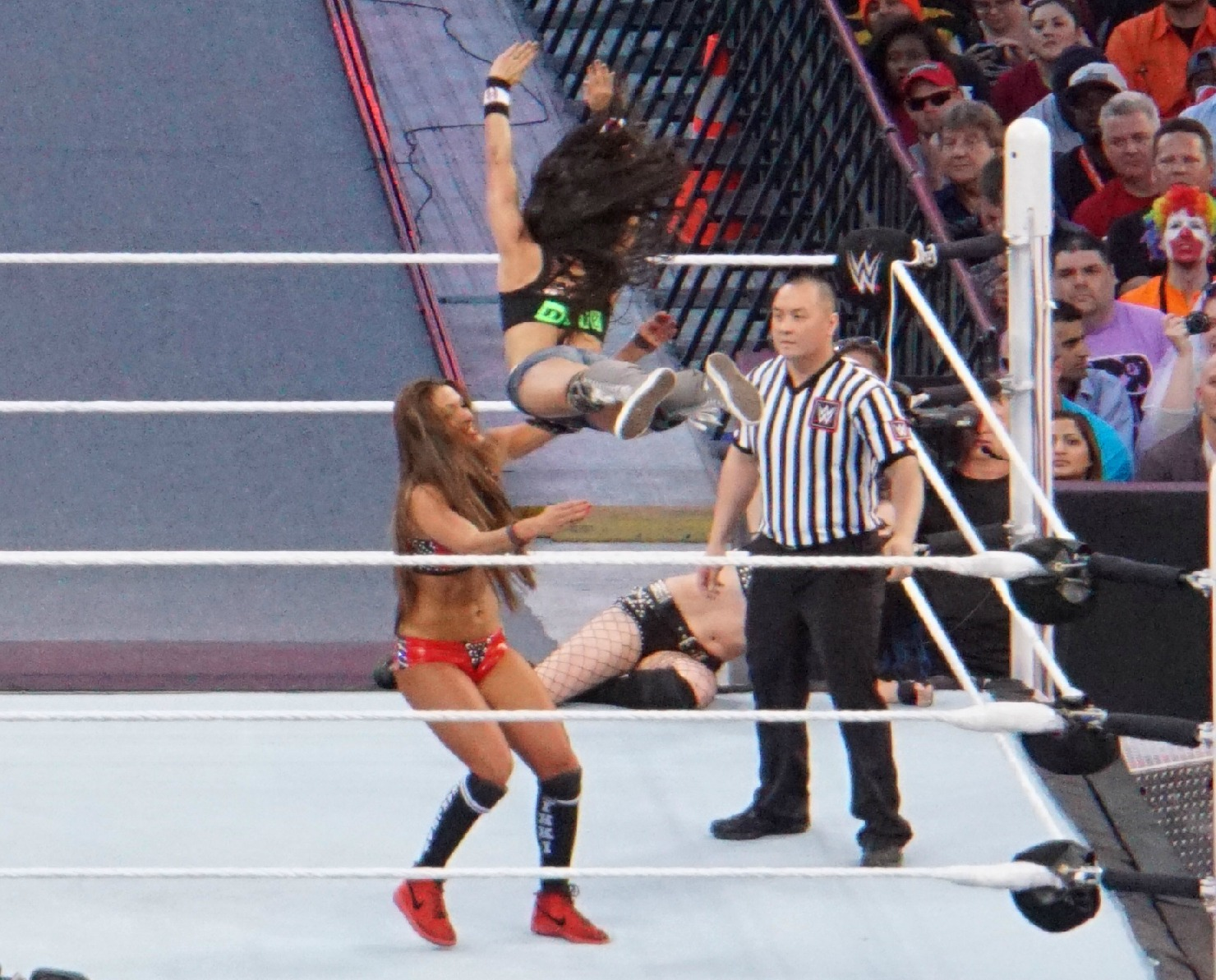
AJ Lee performing a diving crossbody on Nikki Bella at WWE WrestleMania 31

==== Diving crossbody ====
To perform the move, the wrestler jumps from an elevated position (usually the top turnbuckle) onto an opponent, landing horizontally across the opponent's torso, forcing them to the mat and usually resulting in a pinfall attempt. There is also a reversed version, called a reverse crossbody, where the wrestler faces away from the prone opponent before executing the maneuver. This move is one of the basic moves of lightweight wrestlers. This move was made famous as the finisher of WWE Hall of Famer Ricky "The Dragon" Steamboat. The Hurricane used diving crossbody as his finisher and named it the Cape.

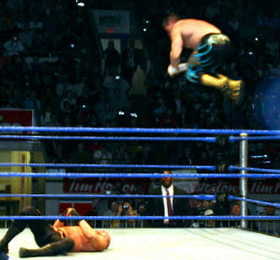
Eddie Guerrero performs a frog splash on Danny Basham.

==== Frog splash ====
This move is performed by leaping from the top rope, stretching out to a horizontal position, and bringing one's feet and hands inward and outward before landing.

Eddie Guerrero made the frog splash famous in the mid-1990s and early 2000s. However, the move itself was innovated by La Fiera in Mexico in the early 1980s. Later it was used by Art Barr in the late 1980s and was named by 2 Cold Scorpio who remarked Barr looked "like a frog" whilst performing the move which resulted in Barr naming it. After Barr's death in 1994, Guerrero used the move in tribute to his fallen tag team partner. After Guerrero's death in 2005, Christian Cage began using the move as a tribute to Guerrero. Hiroshi Tanahashi of New Japan Pro-Wrestling uses this move as the High Fly Flow. T.J. Perkins uses this move since 2020 and calls it the Mamba Splash in honor of the late basketball player Kobe Bryant, of whom Perkins is a fan. Cedric Alexander uses this as one of his finishing moves, called Overtime.

There is a high-angle turning variation named the Five-Star Frog Splash where the opponent is not placed perpendicular to the corner. Instead, the attacker turns mid-air to land on the opponent in the splash position, regardless of which direction the opponent is lying in. It was made famous by ECW, WWF/E and TNA superstar Rob Van Dam as it was used as his finisher. He also uses a regular version, generally going halfway or more than halfway across the ring to hit his opponent. Lio Rush uses a split-legged version called the Final Hour. The split-legged version was popularized by D'Lo Brown, who dubbed his version the Lo Down. Montez Ford uses a spinning version of this move called From the Heavens, as well as Mike Santana, who calls the move the Papi Splash.

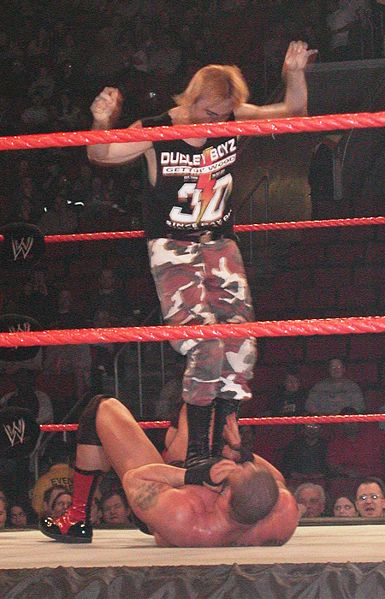
Spike Dudley hitting a diving double foot stomp on Rodney Mack

=== Diving stomp ===
The wrestler jumps down from a raised platform onto an opponent, dropping one foot onto the opponent's body. A variation known as a diving double foot stomp sees the attacking wrestler jumping down from a raised platform on an opponent, driving both feet into the opponent. Finn Balor uses this as his finishing move called the Coup de Grâce. Cameron Grimes uses a running variation of this move called the Cave-In, formerly known as the Caveman Stomp. Swerve Strickland uses a variant where he stomps an opponent on a seated position called Swerve Stomp.

==== Moonsault double foot stomp ====
Also known as the Moonstomp, this variation sees the wrestler perform a moonsault, but instead of landing on a fallen opponent in the splash position, the wrestler continues the rotation driving both feet into the opponent. Innovated by Hikari Fuokoka while Sonjay Dutt and IYO SKY occasionally use this as an finishing move.

==== Mushroom stomp ====
While situated on the middle turnbuckle, a wrestler jumps over a charging opponent, driving one or both feet into the opponent's back, pushing the opponent into the turnbuckle or down to the ground, before landing on their feet. The technique's name is a reference to the stomping attacks used by video game character Mario.

=== Flying body press ===
Differentiating themselves from a splash or a senton, these maneuvers are performed from an upright position, using momentum and weight to run over a standing opponent or pin a fallen one.

==== Falling Thesz press ====
Sitting on the top turnbuckle, the attacking wrestler rests both feet with spread legs on the second ropes waiting for an incoming opponent, then jumps forward through springboarding to sit on the opponent's midsection as in a standing Thesz press.

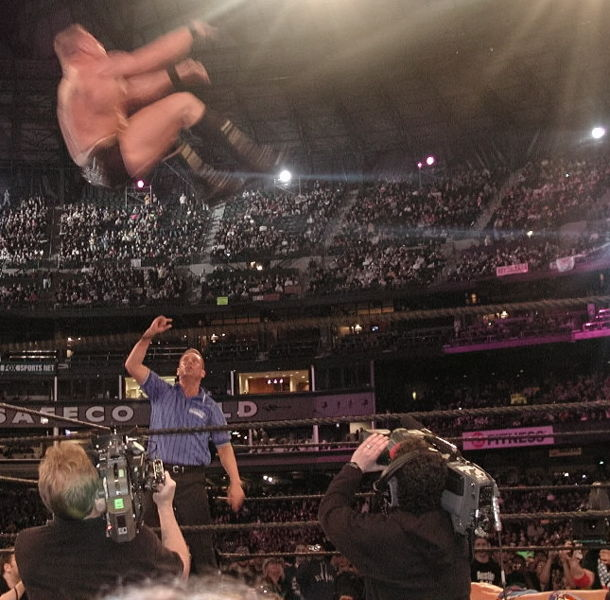
Brock Lesnar failed to achieve a shooting star press on Kurt Angle at WrestleMania XIX, suffering neck injuries and a concussion as a result.

==== Shooting star press ====
A technique invented by Jushin Thunder Liger. The wrestler jumps forward from an elevated position and presses their knees to their own chest, executes a backflip and lands on the opponent as if performing a body press. This move was used by Brock Lesnar and is Matt Sydal's finisher, but was popularized by Billy Kidman in WCW. The move was previously banned in WWE in 2005 for safety reasons, as the move can easily be botched and cause serious injuries, much like the piledriver. Mark Andrews of Total Nonstop Action Wrestling (TNA) uses this as a high-flying move called Fall to Pieces.

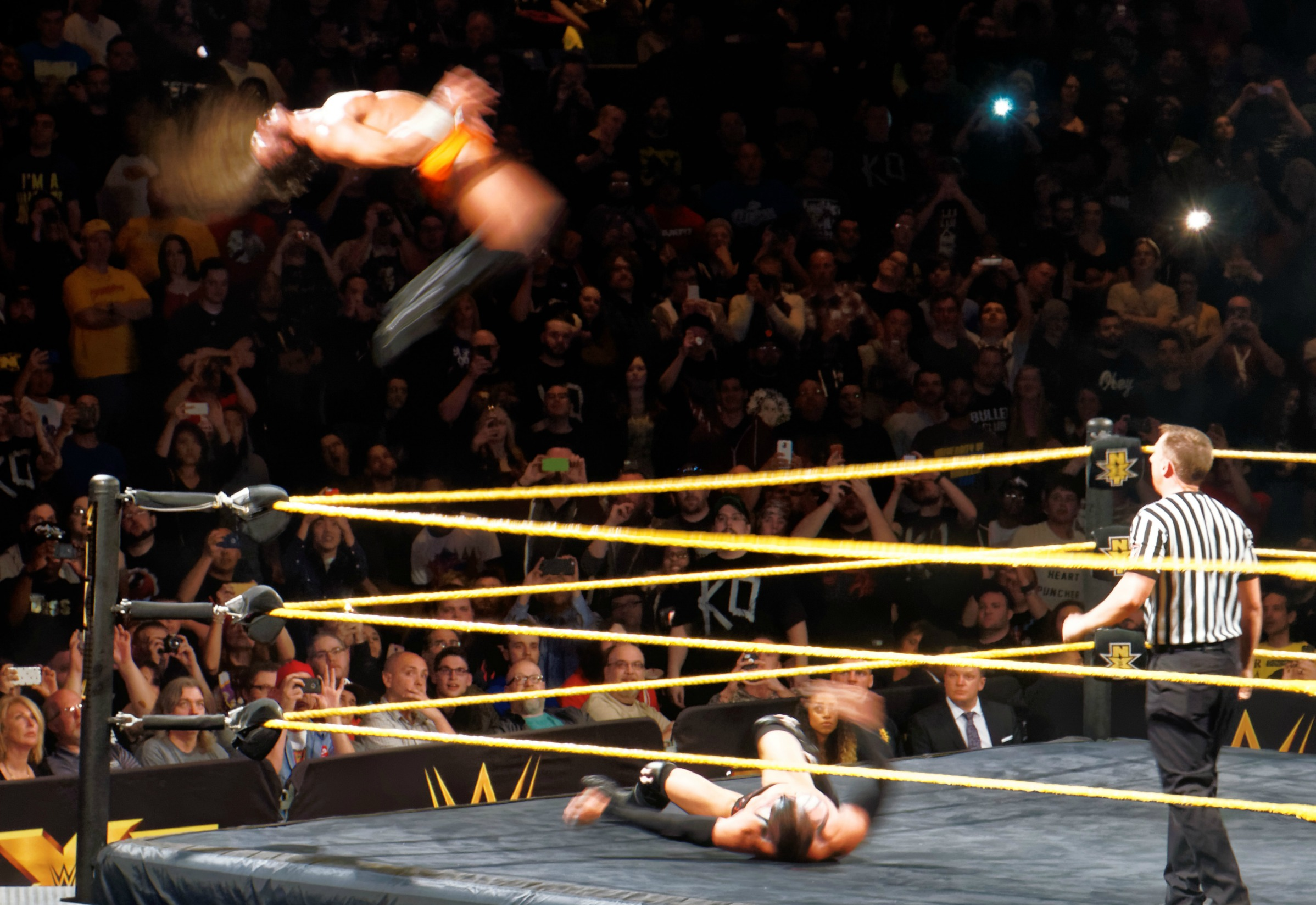
Neville performing a corkscrew shooting star press on Finn Bálor

===== Corkscrew shooting star press =====
This move sees a wrestler jump forward while twisting 360° and performing a backflip. This move is used and has been popularized by PAC who called it the Red Arrow, and later the Black Arrow. It is also known for being used by Will Ospreay and Komander.

=== Flying kicks ===
Several attacks taken from eastern martial arts to Lucha libre, these are widely popular maneuvers amongst fans worldwide.

==== Diving calf kick ====
Standing over the top turnbuckle or top rope, the attacking wrestler jumps off and twists slightly so as soaring midair faces away from the opponent, connecting the side of their lead leg's calf-heel cord area to the opponent's face or chest.

==== Diving leg lariat ====
A leg lariat in which a wrestler jumps from a raised platform towards an opponent and wraps one leg around the opponent's head or neck, knocking them down to the ground.

==== Flying spinning heel kick ====
A move in which the wrestler jumps from an elevated position (usually the top turnbuckle) and strikes a standing opponent with a spinning heel kick mid-air, Yoshi Tatsu use this move as his finisher move.

==== Flying thrust kick ====
Executed when a wrestler jumps from a raised platform (usually the top turnbuckle), and performs a mid-air back kick on a standing opponent.

==== Missile dropkick ====
A move in which the wrestler jumps from an elevated position (usually the top turnbuckle) and strikes a standing opponent with the soles of both feet, essentially executing a diving version of a dropkick. Shane McMahon uses a variation where he leaps from the one corner of the ring to the adjacent side before executing the maneuver to the cornered opponent, naming it the Coast-to-Coast. It is also commonly used by IYO SKY.

== Throws ==
=== Diamond dust ===
This maneuver is performed by an attacking wrestler standing or sitting on an elevated platform facing the back of a standing opponent while applying an inverted facelock. From this position, the attacking wrestler somersaults forward to roll the inverted facelock into a 3/4 facelock. As they fall, the wrestler either drops to a seated position driving the opponent's jaw into their shoulder, or back-first forcing the opponent's face into the mat. Innovated by Masato Tanaka.

=== Diving hurricanrana ===
This move is executed by jumping forward off the top rope with legs apart, then straddling on a standing opponent's shoulders and using the momentum to snap off, rolling and throwing the opponent forward. This move was popularized by Lita as the Litacanrana. Rey Mysterio popularized a springboard version called the West Coast Pop, but rarely uses it in his later years due to knee injuries.

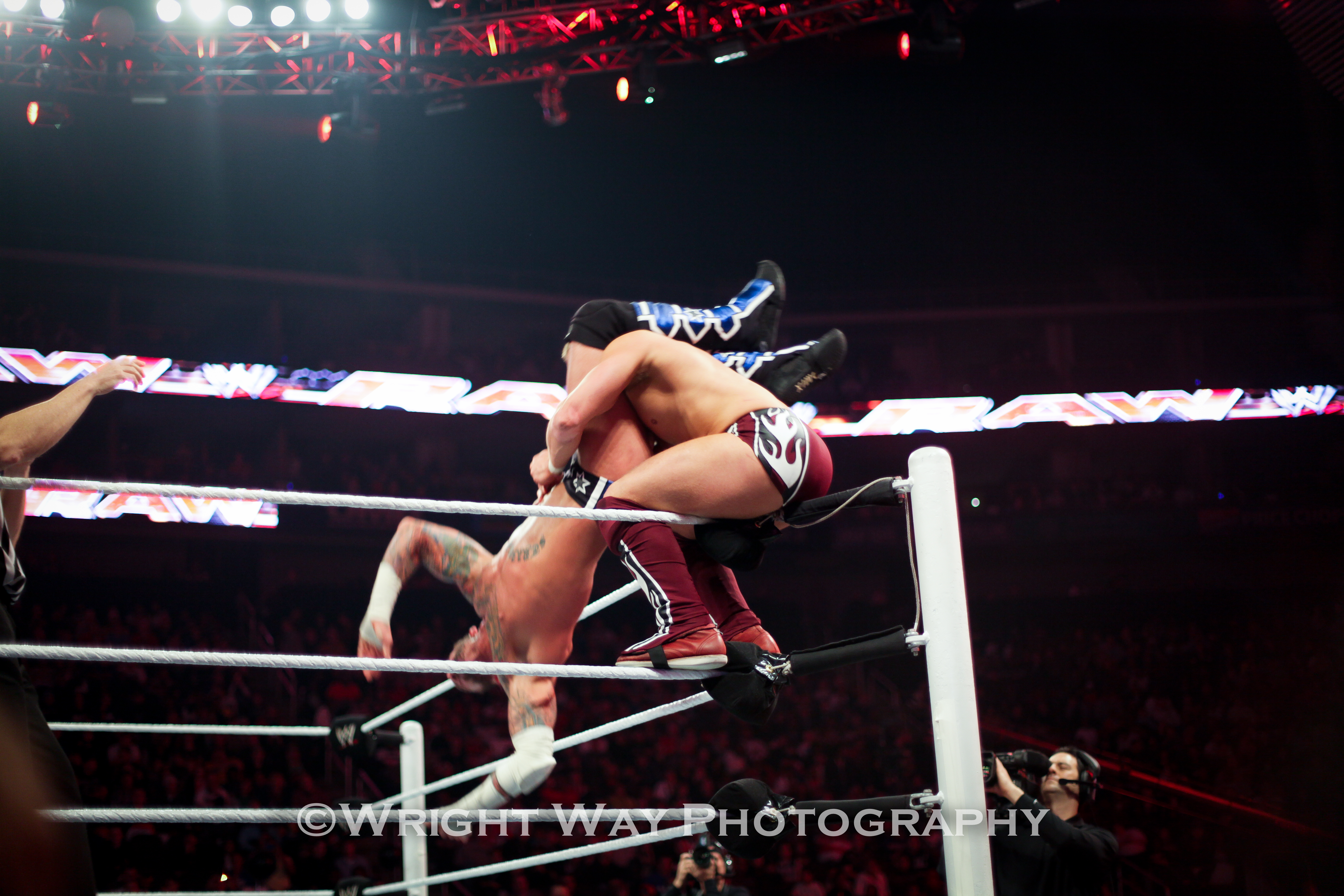
CM Punk performing a Frankensteiner on Daniel Bryan

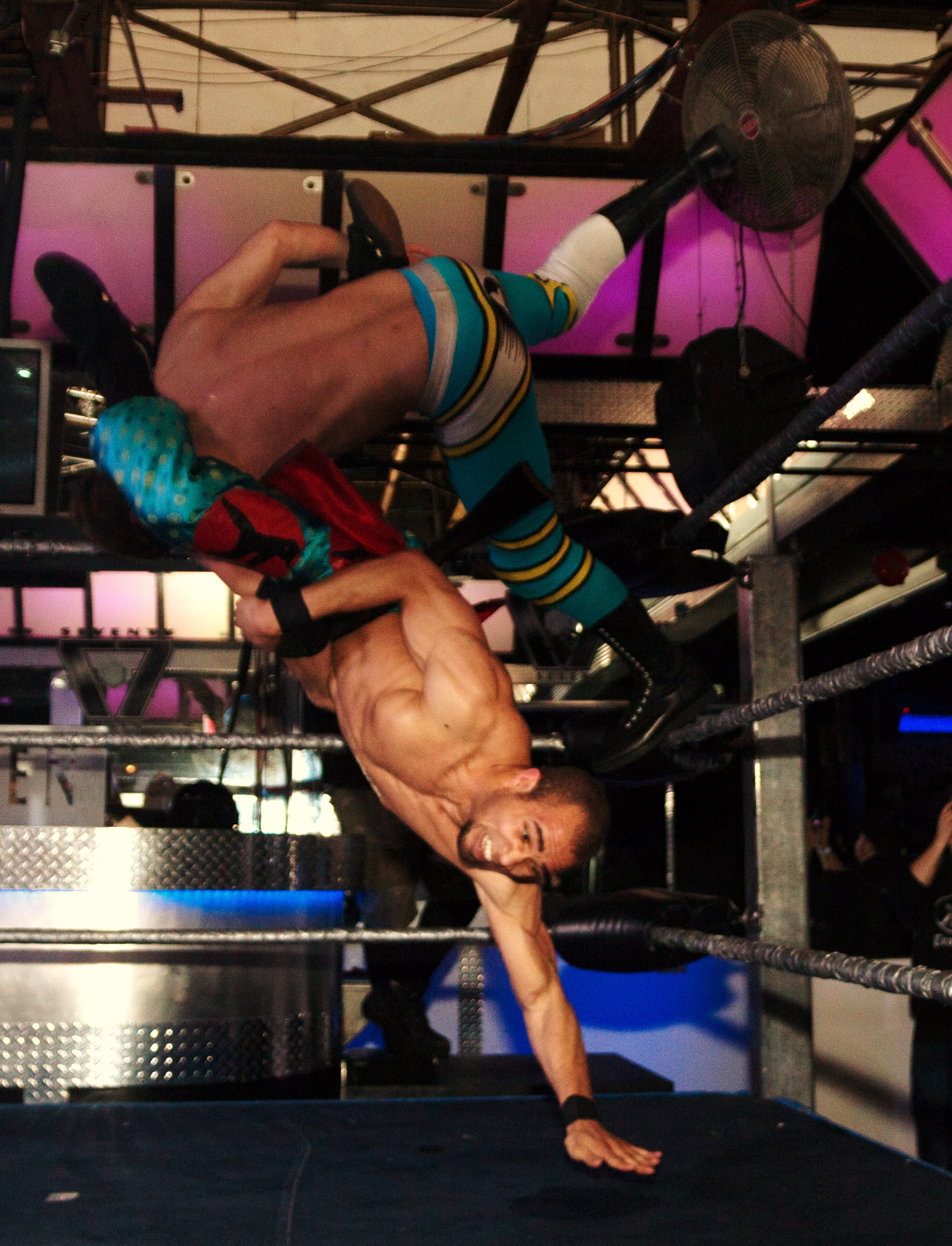
Louis Lyndon (below) executes a top-rope Frankensteiner on Ty Colton

==== Frankensteiner ====
This variant is executed on an opponent sitting on the top turnbuckle. With the attacking wrestler's legs scissored around the opponent's head while they face each other, the wrestler backflips to swing through the opponent's open legs, dragging the opponent into a forced somersault that distances the wrestler from the opponent, who lands back-first. The name comes from Scott Steiner, who possibly invented the move.

A handstand variation can also be used. With the opponent seated on the top turnbuckle facing the ring, the wrestler performs a handspring on the bottom turnbuckle, wrapping both shins or feet around the opponent's neck. The wrestler then throws both legs forward towards the ring, pulling and flipping over the opponent to the mat back first.

Rey Mysterio and Último Dragón uses a spinning version of this move which sees the wrestling positioned on the top rope behind the opponent seated on the same top rope facing the ring inward. The wrestler then places themselves on both the opponents shoulders, spins around 180 degrees, and executes the backflip to land chest first to flip the opponent onto their back. Último Dragón uses this move as a finisher and calls it the Dragonsteiner.

===== Reverse Frankensteiner =====
Also known as Inverted Frankensteiner or Poisoned Frankensteiner, this is executed on an opponent sitting on the top turnbuckle. However, the opponent is facing away from the ring on the top turnbuckle thus the opponent backflips over and lands face first. This move can also be performed to the outside of the ring if the opponent is facing the inside of the ring or sitting on one edge of the corner turnbuckle facing the audience both legs outside of the ring on the same side. There is also a standing variation of this move in which the wrestler jumps onto the opponent's shoulders from behind and then flips backwards driving the opponent's head or chest onto the mat.

==== Dragonrana ====
In this variant the wrestler performs a front flip from the top rope before executing a true hurricanrana into a pin. The technique is named by and after Dragon Kid, who popularized the maneuver.

==== Phoenixrana ====
With this variant the wrestler, facing away from the ring and situated on the top turnbuckle, performs a 180° turn in mid-air and then performs a front flip before executing a pinning hurricanrana. A version used by Jack Evans sees him perform this move from the apron to an opponent standing on the floor, outside of the ring.

=== Shiranui ===
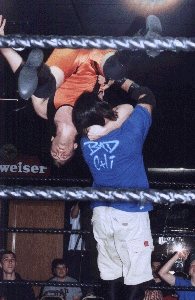
KL Murphy performing a shiranui

Invented by Naomichi Marufuji. A backflip inverted facelock drop where a wrestler puts the opponent into a 3/4 facelock, then runs up the corner turnbuckles or ring ropes and jump backwards performing a backflip, and landing face down driving the opponent down to the mat back-first. Sometimes a standing variant is performed by wrestlers with adequate leaping ability or when assisted by a tag team partner. The move is popularly known, especially in North America, as Sliced Bread No. 2, a name created by wrestler Brian Kendrick. In a slight variation named sitout shiranui the wrestler lands into a seated position instead, driving the opponent's head between the legs.

=== Sunset flip ===
A pinning move where wrestler and opponent face each other, with the wrestler on higher ground (such as the top turnbuckle). The wrestler dives over the opponent, catches them in a waistlock from behind, and rolls into a sitting position landing onto the mat. As the wrestler rolls over, the opponent is pulled over backwards, landing back first in a rana.

== Transition moves ==
Some moves are meant neither to pin an opponent, nor weaken them or force them to submit, but intended to set up the attack on the opponent.

=== Corkscrew ===
The term implies adding a spiral resembling a corkscrew to a maneuver. It can also refer to the motion when a backflip is twisted around so the attacker faces the inside of the ring instead of the outside when the maneuver ends.

=== Moonsault ===
A wrestler executes a backflip and lands torso first on the opponent. A basic moonsault is generally attempted from the top turnbuckle, though myriad variations exist.

=== Ropewalk ===
As the name implies, this term is used to refer to any move which sees the attacking wrestler walking along the top rope before performing a move.

=== Shooting star ===
When a wrestler jumps forward from an elevated position and executes a mid-air backflip. Many techniques can be performed.

=== Slingshot ===
When a wrestler, standing on the ring apron, pulls on the top rope using the momentum to hurl over the ropes and into the ring. Alternatively, a wrestler may use the ropes to bounce the opponent off of them to power a throw or attack such as a powerbomb or a suplex.

=== Somersault ===
A simple front-flip used to modify an aerial technique. A corkscrew is often added to the somersault to further modify a move.

=== Springboard ===
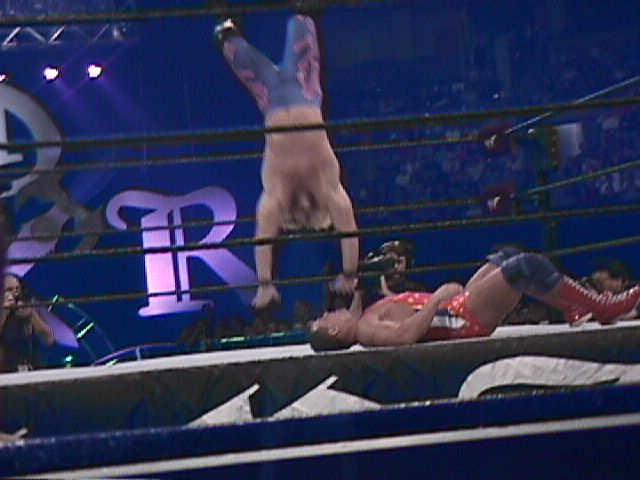
Chris Jericho performing a lionsault (springboard moonsault) on Kurt Angle

When a wrestler using any of the ring ropes bounces upward. Most high-flying techniques can be performed after a spring board. Sometimes wrestlers will bounce off one set of ring ropes then off another to perform a move, this is referred to as a double springboard. A variation of a springboard is the rope run or climb, in which a wrestler runs up, effectively with one foot off each ring rope.

==== Step-through ====
A variation of the springboard, the wrestler starts by standing on the ring apron. As they start entering the ring, the wrestler springboards off of the bottom rope with one leg and performs a move on the opponent. The most common move performed out of the step-through is a tornado DDT, which Xavier Woods used for a brief time. It is also possible to perform it from the inside of the ring into the outside on an opponent on the apron or on the ground.

==== Up-and-over ====
A variation of the springboard in which a wrestler bounces off the corner going fully horizontal, seeing a charging opponent go underneath the springboarding wrestler.

== Modifiers ==
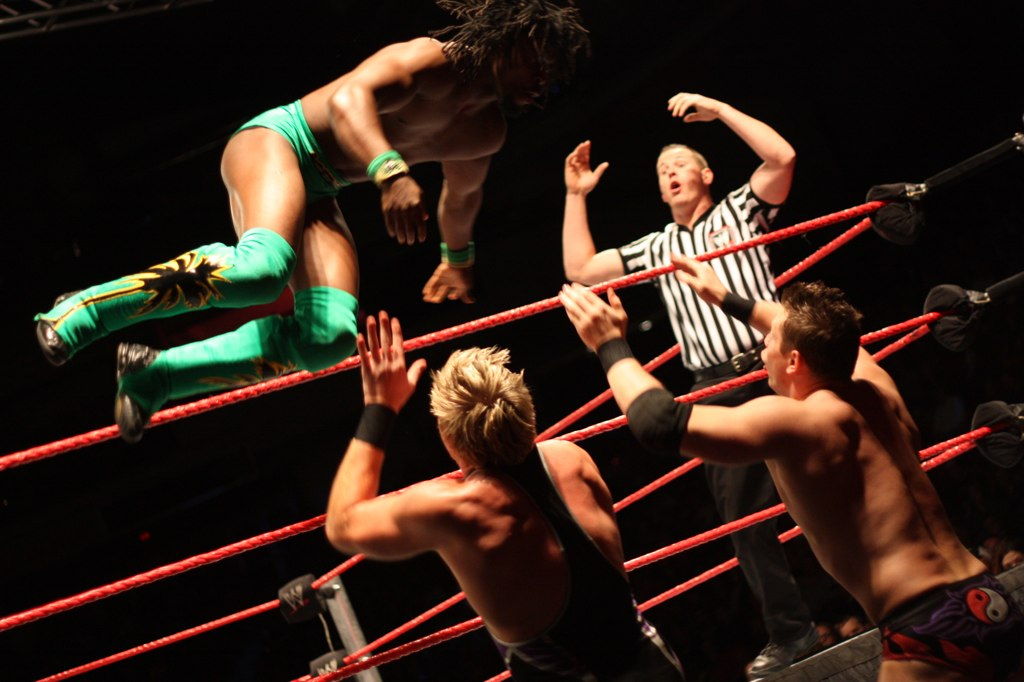
Kofi Kingston performing a plancha on Jack Swagger and The Miz

=== Plancha ===
An accepted term in American wrestling for a slingshot crossbody where the wrestler goes from the inside of the ring over the top ring rope to the outside. In lucha libre, this variant is often called a "pescado" (Spanish for "fish") since a proper plancha is referring to any kind of crossbody. In America, however, a move from the top turnbuckle to a standing opponent on the outside where the chests impact each other is commonly referred to as such. It is also used to refer to any attack from the ring to the outside in which the wrestlers' chests impact each other. For example, a shooting star press to the outside onto a standing opponent is referred to as a shooting star plancha.

=== Standing ===
The term is used to refer to any move performed at the same level the opponent, usually right on the mat, rather than most aerial moves where the attacking wrestler performs them from a raised platform.

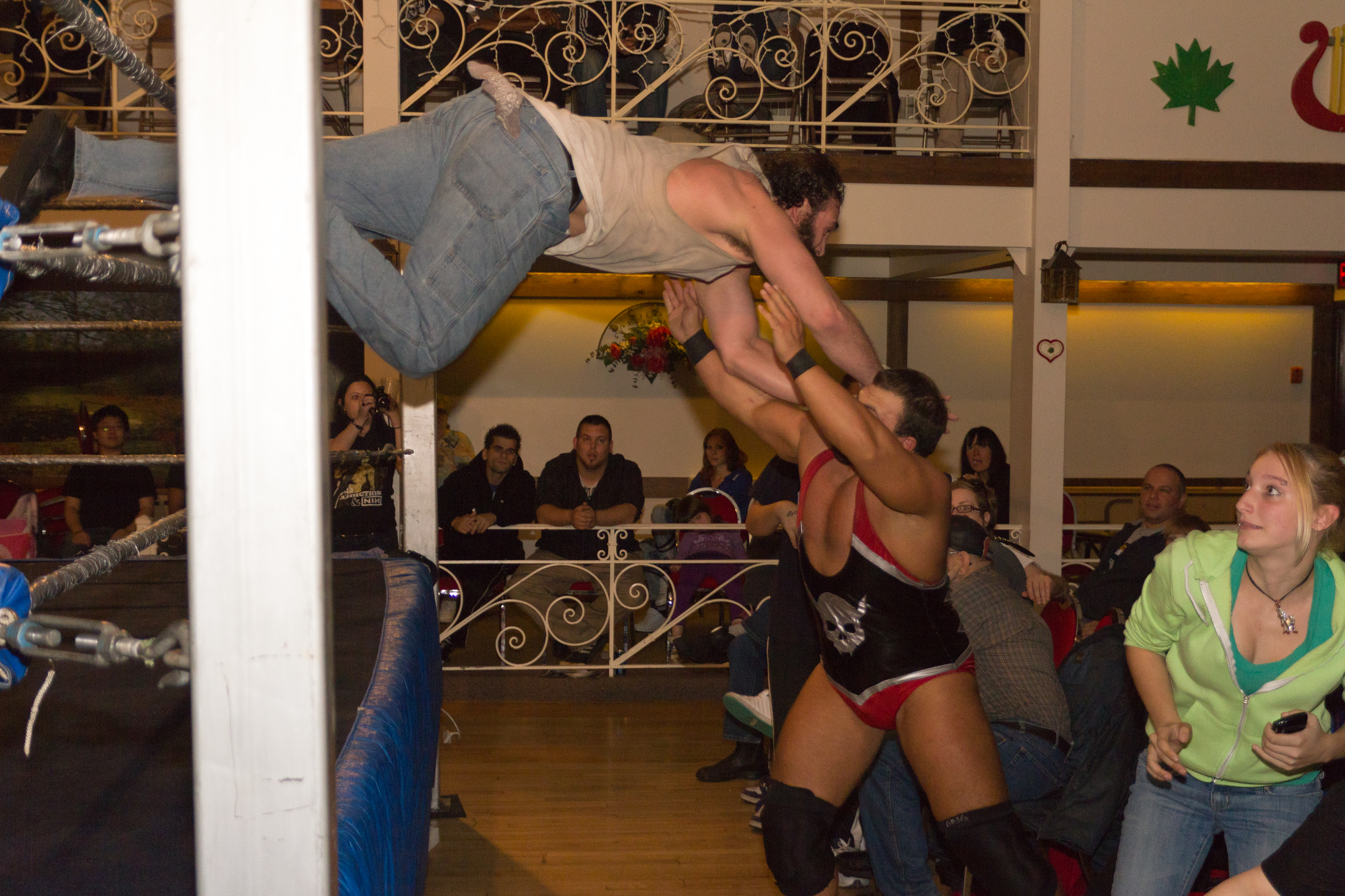
Brodie Lee performing a suicide dive onto Michael Elgin

=== Suicide ===
Often occurring in Spanish as suicida, this term is placed before any move that goes from any of the ring parts to the outside of the ring. The most common example is the suicide dive known as topé suicida (Spanish for "suicide headbutt"). When a somersault is performed after leaping through the ropes, or by jumping over the top rope, to land on the opponent back first, the move is known as a suicide senton or topé con giro (Sp. spinning headbutt). Outside Mexico, the move is incorrectly referred to as topé con hilo, for it was mistranslated in Japan (Since hilo in Spanish actually means thread) and the term has remained as such.

=== Super ===
This term (often exchanged for diving, elevated, top-rope, or avalanche) is placed before any move performed normally on the mat but when executed off the top or second rope.

=== Topé ===
A topé (from the original Spanish tope, meaning headbutt), like the plancha, is a move most often performed by jumping from the inside of the ring and out, but instead of going over the top rope, the topé is performed by leaping forward through the ropes in order to strike the opponent with the head. In Mexico, topé also refers to any variation of a battering ram.

== See also ==
- Professional wrestling holds
- Professional wrestling throws
- Professional wrestling strikes
- Professional wrestling double-team maneuvers
- Glossary of professional wrestling terms
