= Double Full =

Trampoline move

The Double Full is a trampoline move that comprises a single (normally straight) back somersault with two full twists. This move also may be executed on the ground in rapid succession as part of a cheerleading/gymnastics/acrobatics routine.

Compared to a full back (full twisting back somersault), a double full is a more advanced move. It's not often seen in high-grade routines because it has only 360° of somersault rotation.

The performer sharply and tightly brings the arms down to the sides and maintains a straight body position to speed up the rotation generated from a full back. Variations of this twist-acceleration process include folding the arms one above the other across the midsection or crossing the arms to form an "X" shape across the chest. The latter is becoming less common due to debate over its safety.

Double fulls are usually performed in the straight position, though they may be performed in both tucked and piked shapes. The straight shape is most common, however, since it helps to slow the somersault rotation down. As somersault rotation is sped up greatly with the addition of twist, keeping rotation low is important, especially as there is a great deal of twist rotation involved in the move.
