= Walkover (disambiguation) =

A walkover is an automatic victory awarded if there are no other players available.

Walkover may also refer to:

- Uncontested election, where all candidates are elected by default
- Walkover (film), a 1965 Polish film
- Back walkover, an acrobatic maneuver
- Front walkover, an acrobatic maneuver
- A tennis term (often abbreviated as w/o) when a player is awarded a victory because their opponent is unable to start the match
