= Roll (gymnastics) =

Movement in gymnastics

A roll is the most basic and fundamental skill in gymnastics class. There are many variations in the skill. Rolls are similar to flips in the fact that they are a complete rotation of the body, but the rotation of the roll is usually made on the ground while a flip is made in the air with the hips passing over the head and without any hands touching the ground. Rolls also help recover from a fall safely.

== Forward roll ==
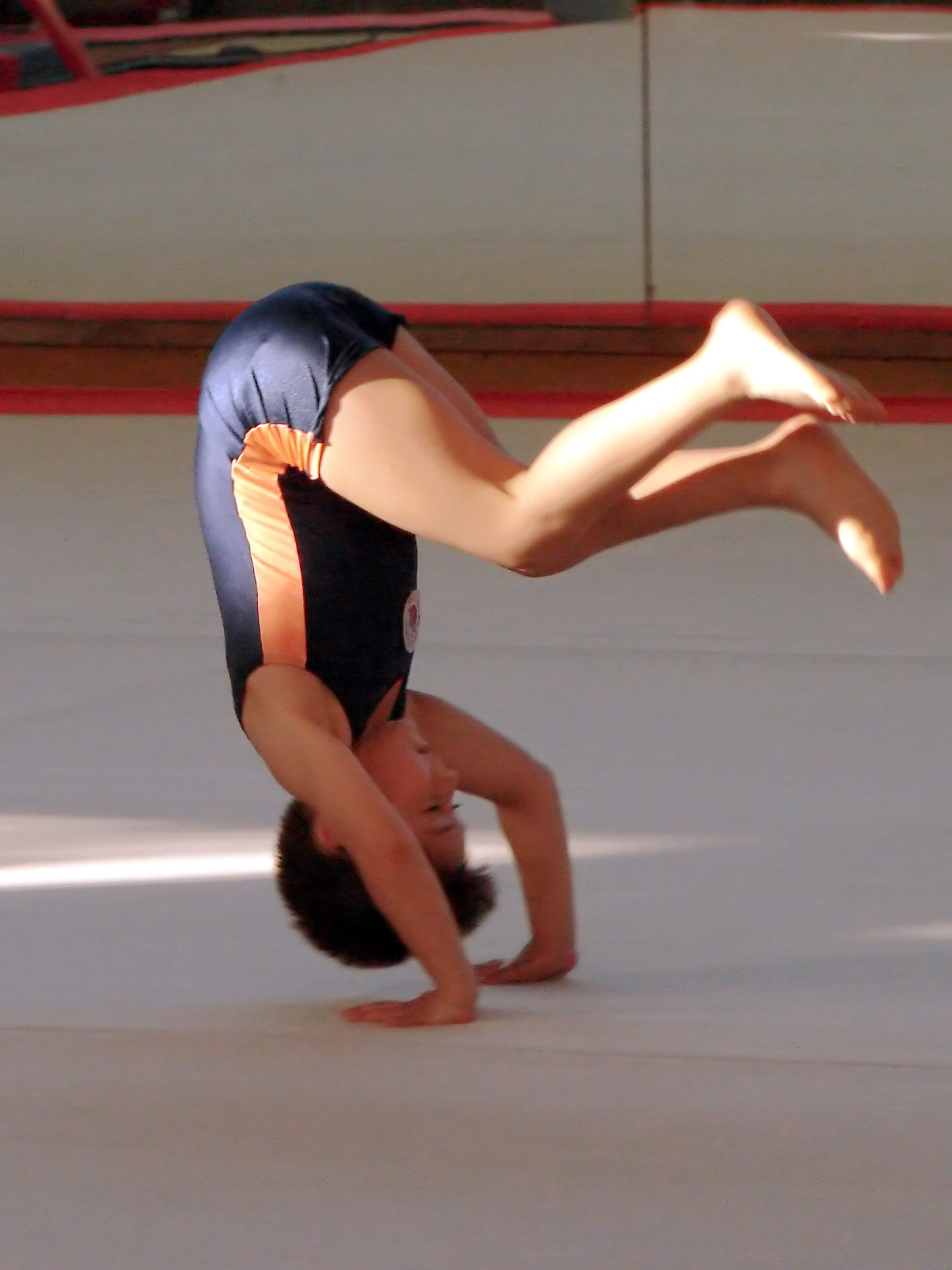
A child performing a forward roll

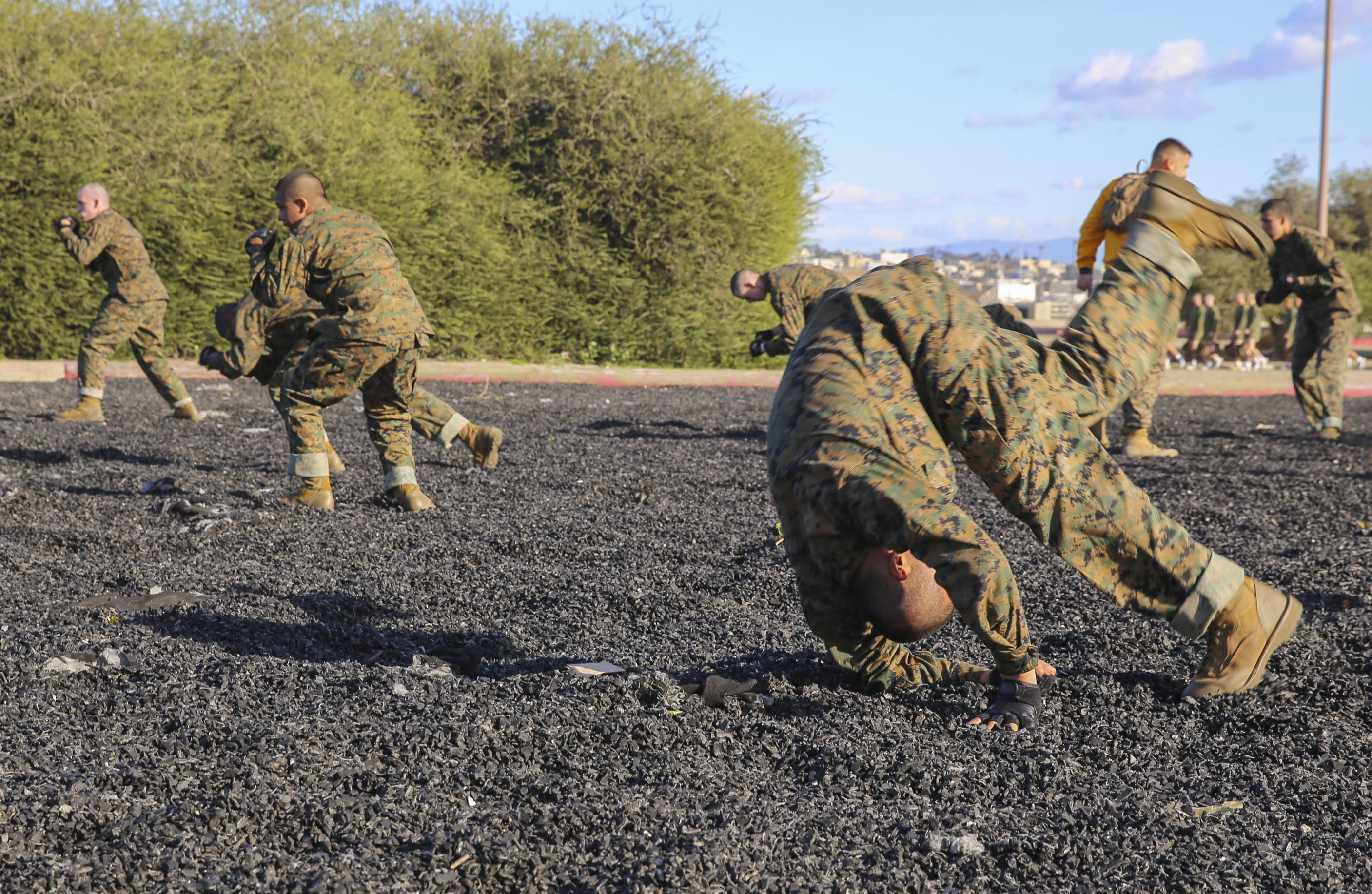
A forward shoulder roll being performed

The forward roll is one of the most basic elements in gymnastics and one of the first learnt. The forward roll is started from a standing position and then the gymnast crouches down, places their hands shoulder wide apart and hands facing forward. They tuck their chin to their chest and place the back of their head onto the floor. They then push off of the floor with their legs and rotate over their head onto their back. The gymnast then presses their feet onto the floor and whips the arms forward to stand up.

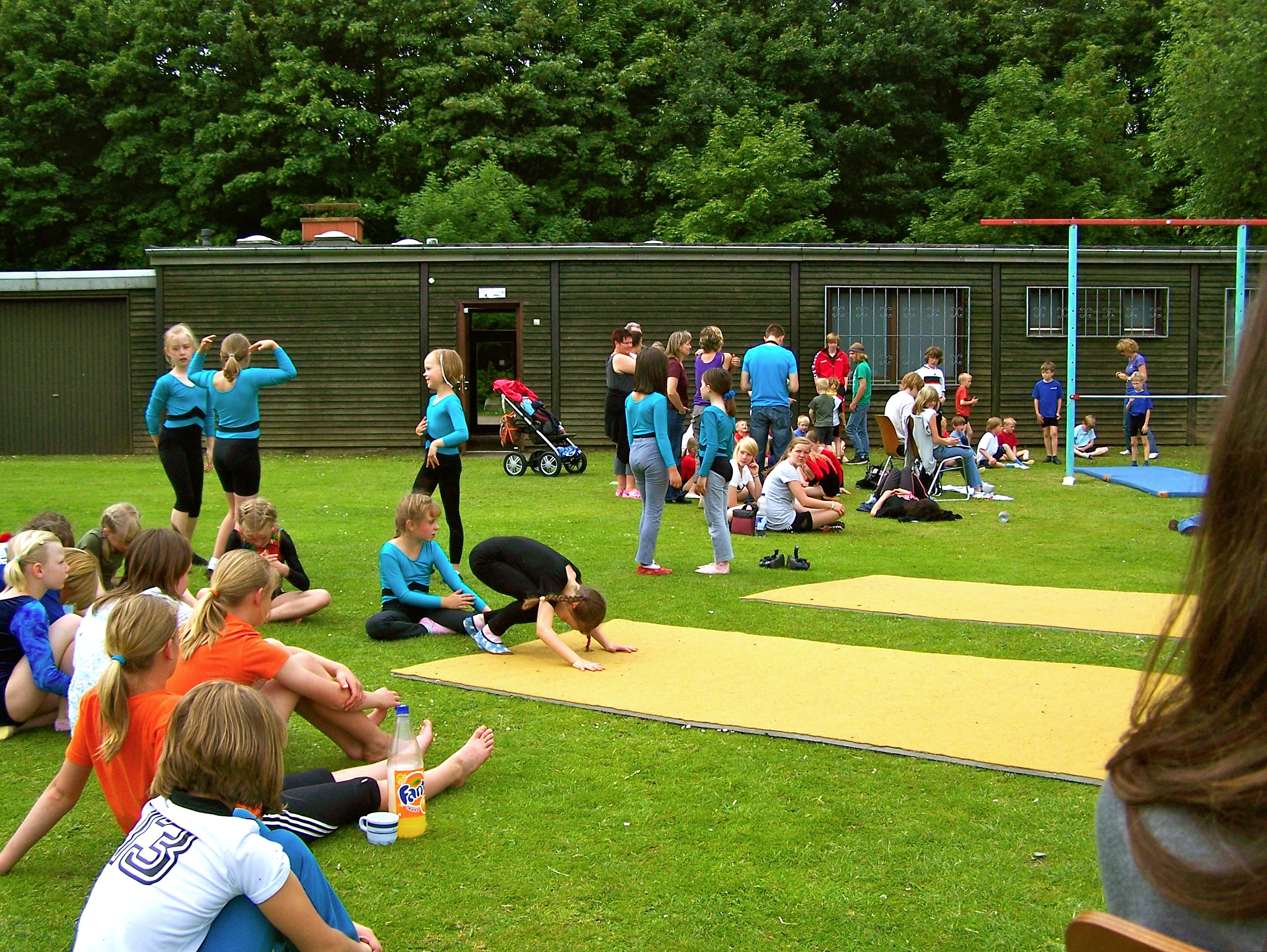
A child performing a forward roll

== Backward roll ==
The backward roll is similar to the forward roll, but in reverse. The gymnast starts in a standing position and bends to a squat/sitting position with their arms in front. They then lower and lean back slightly until their bottom reaches the floor. They then continue this momentum and roll over their back onto their shoulders. They should then place their hands next to their shoulders and tuck their head into their chin. The hands then push the floor strongly and straighten their arms and continue to rotate their body over their head. The feet are then placed on the floor and the gymnast stands.

Variations:

- Backward roll to handstand - This is essentially the same as a backward roll, however when the hands make contact with the ground, they straighten fully and the body continues to straighten upwards into a handstand position.
- Backward roll on rings - This is the same movement as a backward roll but it is performed on rings. It can also be used in a combination such as backwards roll to Maltese.
- Shoulder roll – This is similar to a backward roll but the roll is performed over one shoulder rather than pushing with the arms and rolling over the head. This is more commonly performed in rhythmic gymnastics, as it is faster and it also protects the hair.

== Sideways roll ==
A sideways roll is also known as a log roll, barrel roll, pencil roll, or sausage roll. This can be started by lying down on the back or front with the body outstretched. The gymnast then rolls onto their side and does a complete rotation of the body, remaining parallel to the performing surface. The log roll is a sideways roll with the hands next to the waist and the pencil roll is with the hands stretched above the head. A sideways roll can also be performed when a gymnast over-rotates or loses their balance in a vertical, forward or sideways direction.

== Tucked sideways roll ==
A Tucked Sideways roll begins with the gymnast starting in a kneeling position, with the gymnast sitting back onto their heels with their head and arms in an outstretched position like the child pose in yoga. From here, the gymnast rolls onto their side with their legs maintaining the tucked position and onto their knees again.

== Tin soldier roll/Teddy bear roll ==
This roll starts by sitting on the floor in a straddle position. The legs are held below the knees and the body leans over towards the shoulder on one side. The gymnast then folds more tightly until they roll over their back and return to a sitting straddle position.

== Dive roll ==
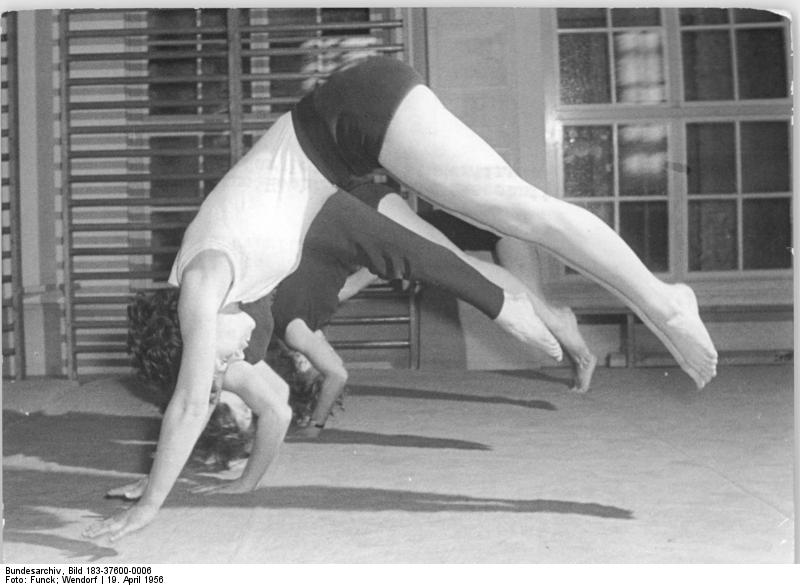
Dive roll

Dive roll over a table

A dive roll is an acrobatic stunt that begins with a horizontal forward diving motion and results in a forward roll. It is considered an advanced forward roll, demonstrating flight and a smooth landing. It is also used in other sports such as wrestling and parkour to reinforce the motion of landing correctly.

== See also ==
- Somersault
