= Front limber =

Gymnastics skill

A front limber is a gymnastics skill where the gymnast performs a handstand, carries the momentum forward, landing in a bridge, and then pulls their upper body upwards, ending in a standing position. It is related to a front walkover, but it is a variant as both legs are carried forward at once whereas each leg is taken over separately in a walkover.

This is how it is done correctly:

1. Kick up into handstand, and hold it momentarily.
2. Push shoulders 'out' and arch the back, with feet together and toes pointed.
3. Bend knees until feet land on the floor.
4. Immediately push the hips forward and push off the hands to stand up ending with arms overhead.

Tips: Look at hands throughout

1. Land with feet about a foot apart
2. Stretch back before doing a front limber
3. If doing for the first time, do on to a raised surface (sofa, mat) as the back does not have to arch as much.

== Similar gymnastic skills ==
- Back limber
- Front walkover, Back walkover
- Front or back handsprings
