= Acro dance =

Style of dance with acrobatics

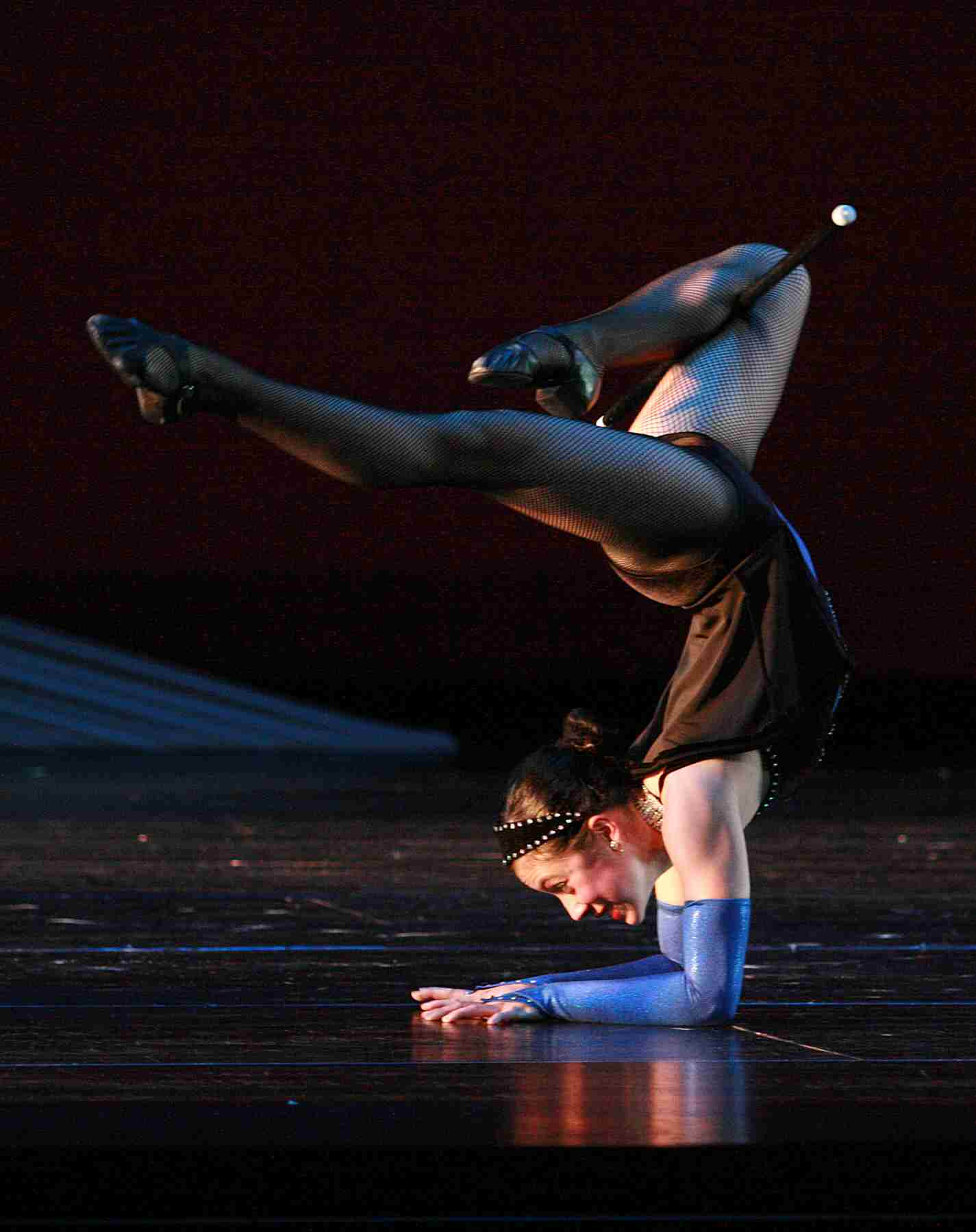
An elbow stand, performed as part of an acro dance routine

Acro dance is a style of dance that combines classical dance technique with acrobatic elements. It is defined by its athletic character, its unique choreography, which blends dance and acrobatics, and its use of acrobatics in a dance context. It is a popular dance style in amateur competitive dance as well as in professional dance theater and in contemporary circus productions such as those by Cirque du Soleil. This is in contrast to acrobatic, artistic and rhythmic gymnastics, which are sports that employ dance elements in a gymnastics context under the auspices of a governing gymnastics organization (such as FIG) and subject to a Code of Points. Acro dance is known by various other names including acrobatic dance and gymnastic dance, though it is most commonly referred to simply as acro by dancers and dance professionals.

Acro is an especially challenging dance style for dancers as it requires them to be trained in both dance and acrobatic skills.

== History ==
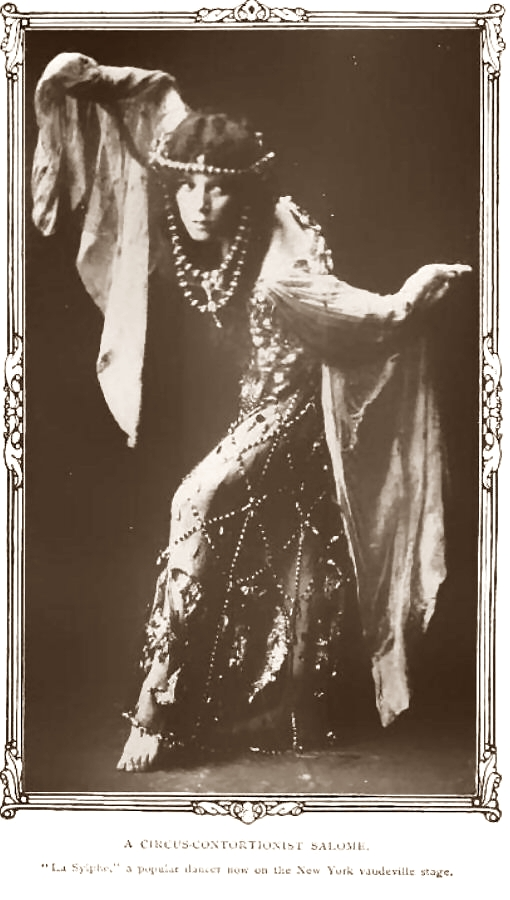
Vaudeville dancer La Sylphe (c. 1908)

Acrobatic dance emerged in the United States and Canada in the early 1900s, as one of the types of acts performed in vaudeville. Although individual dance and acrobatic acts had been performed in vaudeville for several decades prior to 1900, it was not until the early 1900s that it became popular to perform acts that combined dance and acrobatic movements.

Acrobatic dance did not suddenly appear in vaudeville; rather, it appeared gradually over time in a variety of forms, and consequently no individual performer has been cited as its originator. Sherman Coates (1872–1912), who performed with the Watermelon Trust from 1900 to 1914, was recalled by fellow dancers as the first acrobatic dancer they had ever seen. Another of the earliest documented acrobatic dance performers was Tommy Woods, who became well known for his slow-motion acrobatic dance in Shuffle Along, in which he would execute acrobatic movements precisely in time with the music. In 1914, acrobat Lulu Coates formed the Crackerjacks, a popular vaudeville troupe that included acrobatic dance in their performance repertoire up until the group disbanded in 1952. Many other popular vaudeville companies combined acrobatics and dance in their shows, including the Gaines Brothers, and Miriam (The acrobatic Tapper) who performed with the Wells & The Four Fays "Tumbling Acrobats" on The Ed Sullivan Show on February 9, 1964,

Since the decline of the vaudeville era, acrobatic dance has undergone a multi-faceted evolution to arrive at its present-day form. The most significant aspect of this evolution is the integration of ballet technique as the foundation for dance movements, thus bringing into acro dance a precision of form and movement that was absent in vaudeville acrobatic dance. Also, vaudeville acrobatic dances were often little more than acrobatics set to music, whereas modern acro dance is fundamentally dance, with its acrobatic movements performed in a dance context.

== Characteristics ==
A defining characteristic of acro is the smooth, graceful transitions between dance and acrobatic movements. Also, a dance must have a significant percentage of dance movement, with respect to its acrobatic content, in order for it to be categorized as acro. For example, a gymnastics floor exercise is not considered to be Acro Dance because it has little or no technical dance movement, compared to its acrobatic content. It also lacks smooth transitions between dance and gymnastic movements. Also, Acro Dance does not employ supporting apparatus such as those used in acrobatic gymnastics.

=== Dance technique ===
The dance movements in Acro Dance are founded in ballet, jazz, lyrical, contemporary and modern dance styles. Acro dance movements are not restricted to these dance styles, but the complete absence of these styles will typically cause a dance to be categorized as something other than acro (e.g., breakdance).

=== Acrobatic elements ===
The acrobatic movements and acts of balance performed in an acro dance are referred to as tricks. A variety of tricks are commonly performed in acro dance, varying widely in complexity and the skills required to perform them. Aside from the obvious requirement that dancers possess the requisite skills to perform tricks, the types of tricks that can be performed in an acro dance depends on the number of dancers. Solo tricks can be performed by independent dancers in solo or group dances. Examples of this are:

Individual Acro Dance Tricks :
- Bridge / Backbend
- Cartwheel
- Roundoff
- Front walkover
- Back walkover
- Valdez
- Leg Extensions
- Handstand
- Bow and Arrow Handstand
- Hollowbody handstand
- Backwards split rolls
- Illusions
- Chest stand
- Elbow / Forearm Balance
- Handspring
- Kip-up
- Side aerial
- Front tuck
- Back tuck
- Back layout
Front aerial

Hand walking

Valdez

One-hand front walkover

"Strength, flexibility and balance are also major pillars of Acro Dance, and postures often inspired by those of contortion are used throughout Acro Dance along side agility (tricks) and dance technique." - says BethanyRose Boutwell (Salt Lake City's Acrobatic Dance Teacher since 2012)

An Example of strength needed could be for example: a press up handstand.

| Flexibility Postures in Individual Acro Dance: |
|---|
| Bridge / Backbend; Right Split; Left Split; Center Split; Chest Stand; Bow and Arrow Handstand; Hollow body handstand |

Double tricks—also known as partnering tricks—Is inspired by partner dance(ballroom and Latin styles), circus acrobatics (adagio) and can only be performed by a pair of dancers. An example of this is the pitch tuck, in which one dancer forms a "saddle" with his hands. The second dancer steps onto the saddle and then the first dancer thrusts the saddle upward. The second dancer, who is propelled upward with back rotation, lands on her feet after a complete revolution in the air. Acro partners will sometimes execute lifts and adagio in addition to single and double tricks.

Partner Acro Dance Tricks :
- Double back walkover (partner limber)
- Double cartwheel
- Partner Barrel
- shoulder stand
- Lawnmover
- Pitch Tuck
- Swizzle
Lawnmower

Pitch tuck

Swizzle

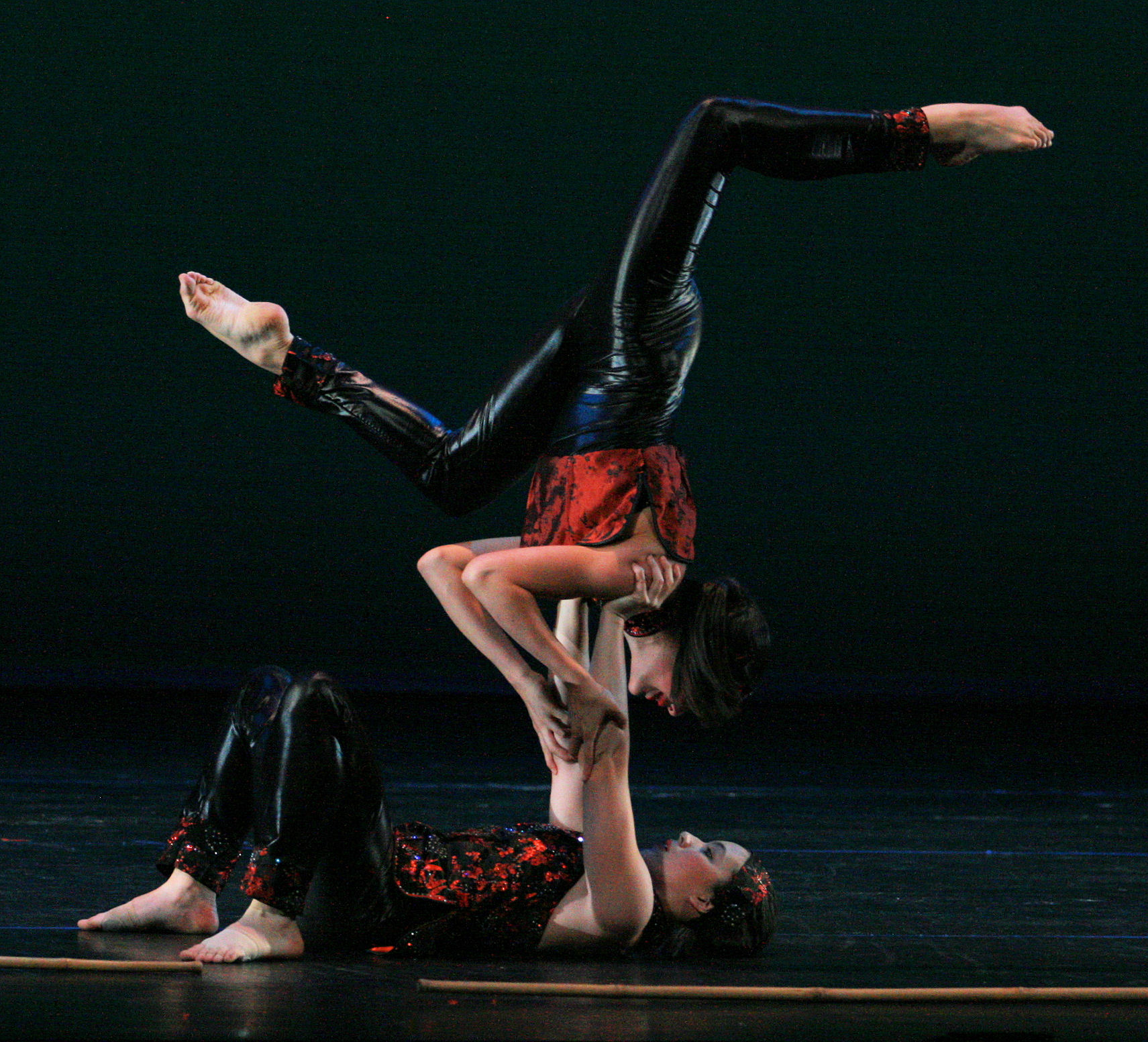
Shoulder stand

Group tricks generally require three or more dancers, but again moving in transitions is important to make it Acro Dance. Examples of these group tricks are:

- Bridge pyramid
- Triple cartwheel

== Apparel ==
=== Footwear ===
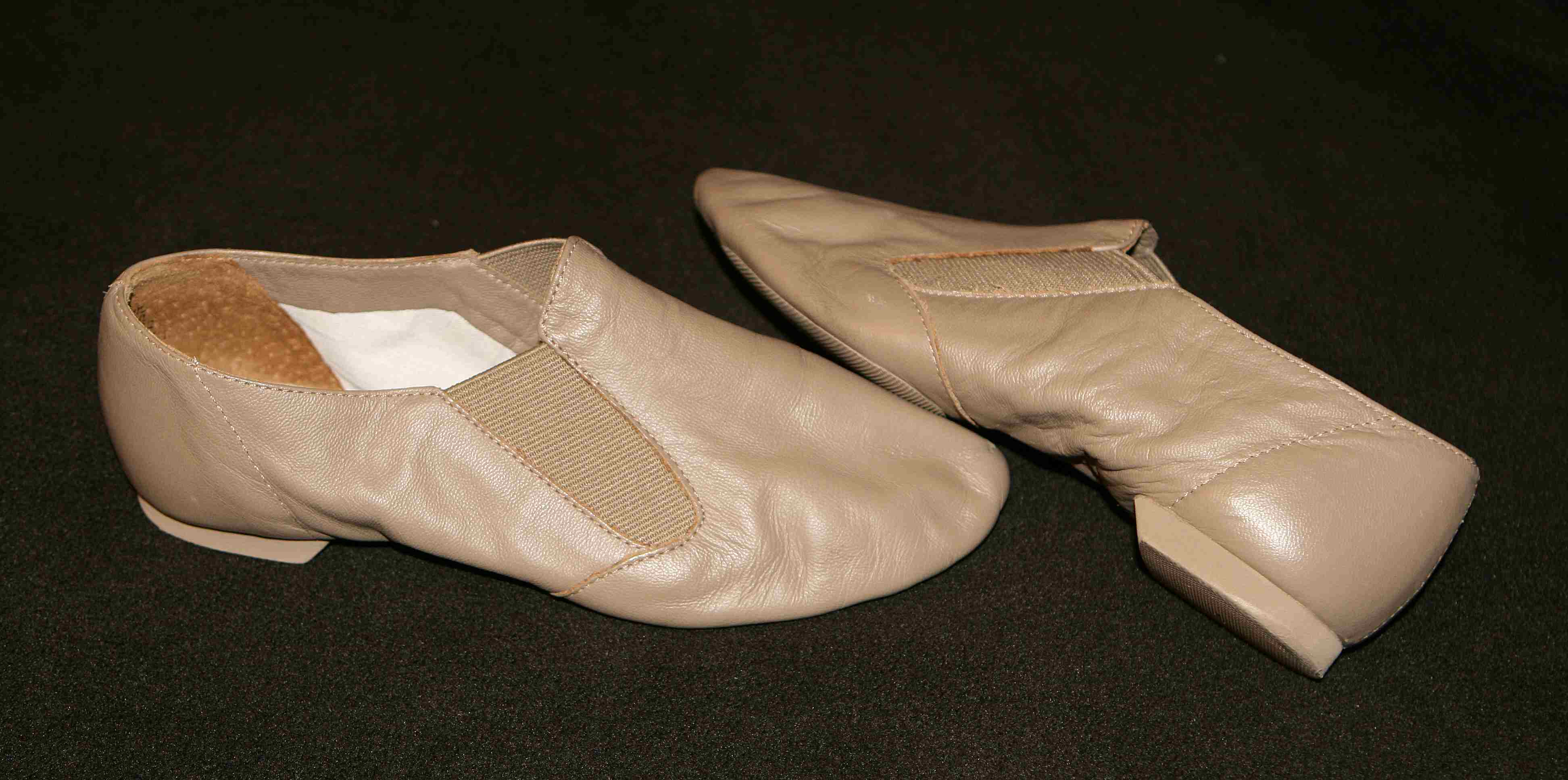
A pair of acro shoes

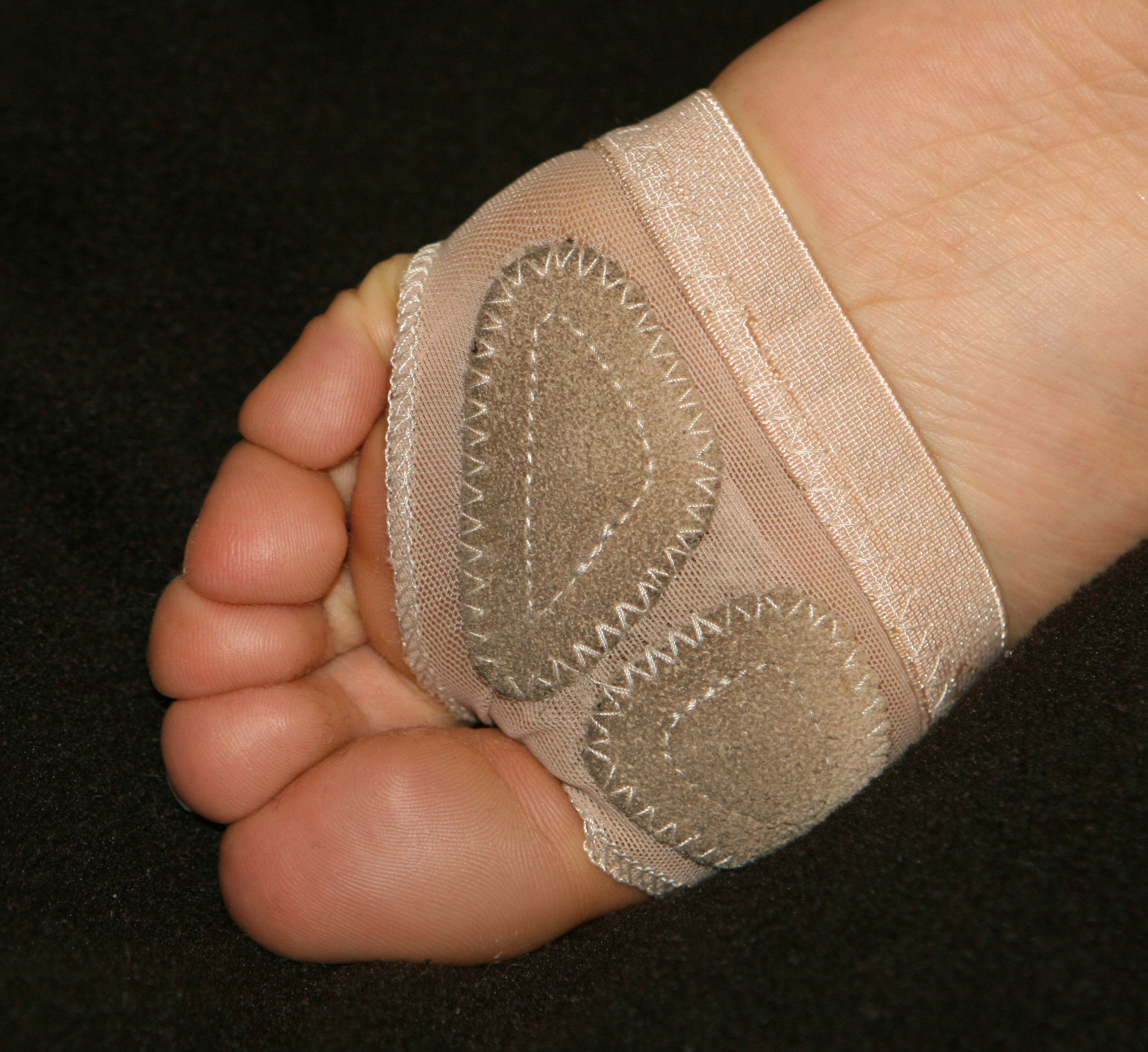
A foot thong, as viewed from the bottom

Acro dances are typically performed on hard stages with widely varying surfaces. Such floors differ substantially from a gymnastics floor, which is constructed by layering a standard surface over cushioning foam and spring floor. Whereas gymnasts perform barefoot and rely on the standard gymnastics floor for traction and cushioning, acro dancers seldom dance barefoot, instead depending on footwear such as acro shoes or foot thongs to provide the necessary traction and cushioning.

All of the most common types of acro footwear provide both traction and cushioning. In addition, acro performance surfaces are frequently rough, so acro footwear must protect the bottom of the foot from skin abrasion. Abrasion protection is particularly important on the ball of the foot, which is subjected to a great deal of friction during dance turns and leaps. Traction is essential to prevent lateral slipping that could result in dangerous falls to the hard floor. Cushioning serves to soften the impact when performing tricks such as tucks and layouts, in which a dancer's feet may strike the floor at high velocity. Cushioning is especially important when a Marley floor is unavailable, because uncovered performance surfaces have no cushioning whatsoever and thus may be extremely hard and unyielding.

==== Acro shoes ====
Acro dancers most often wear jazz dance shoes, which are commonly referred to as acro shoes by acro dancers. Acro shoes are called jazz boots, jazz ankle boots, jazz booties and other names, by their various manufacturers. They are typically laceless, slip-on shoes, with tight-fitting leather uppers that are designed to prevent the dancer's feet from shifting inside the shoes. Because of their thin, pliable leather uppers and split soles, acro shoes have excellent flexibility, thus enabling dancers to attain both good dance form and acrobatic control. The sole is made of soft, composite rubber so as to provide both high traction and cushioning, and it provides excellent protection from skin abrasion as it covers the entire bottom of the foot.

==== Foot thongs ====
Less commonly, acro dancers may wear foot thongs, which are variously called Dance Paws and FootUndeez, depending on the manufacturer. Foot thongs—which are slip-on, partial foot covers that protect only the ball of the foot—are sometimes preferred over acro shoes for aesthetic reasons. In particular, flesh colored foot thongs endow the wearer with the appearance of having bare feet, while retaining some degree of the traction, cushioning, and abrasion protection provided by acro shoes.

=== Clothing ===
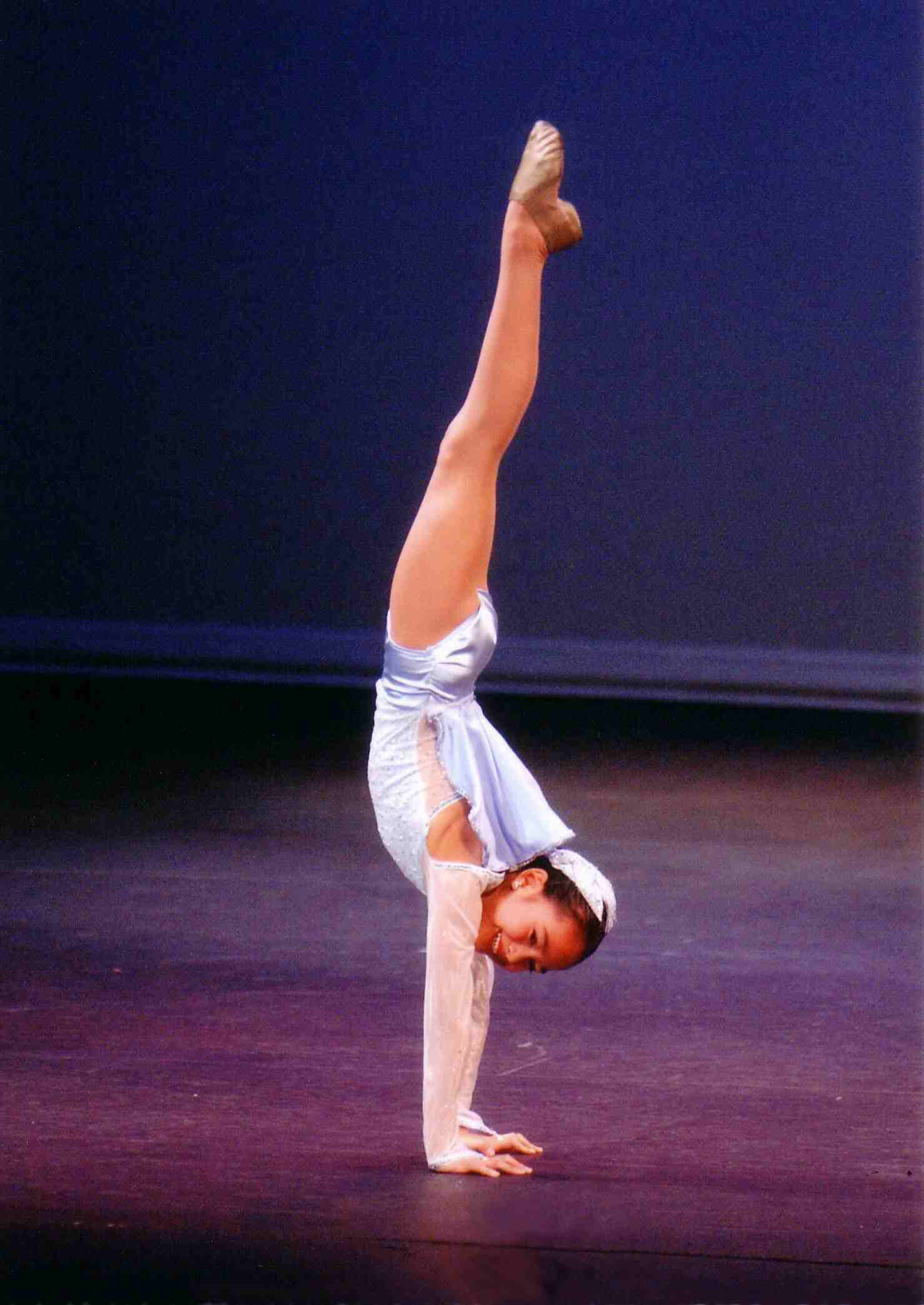
The skirt of this acro costume is short so it will not contact the headpiece when the dancer is inverted.

Acro dancers commonly wear flexible, form-fitting clothing for both safety and aesthetic reasons. Form-fitting clothing is preferred over loose clothing because the latter does not move synchronously with the body and thus may interfere with a dancer's ability to maintain control. This is especially important when a dancer is performing tricks, as loss of control can lead to serious injury. Aside from the safety aspect, form-fitting clothing also helps to expose a dancer's body lines, which can add significantly to the visual impact of an acro dance performance.

Competitive acro dancers frequently wear costumes when performing at dance competitions. Acro costumes often have loose fabric pieces such as short skirts, but the sizes and locations of these pieces are carefully calculated to ensure that they pose no safety risks. As an extra safety measure, skirts are sometimes pinned or stitched at the back below the waistline so that they will not hang at full length when the dancer is inverted, as in hand walking; this prevents the skirt—which might otherwise become entangled in the dancer's hair or costume headpiece—from contacting the dancer's head.

== Competitive acro ==
Acro dance is not uniformly defined within the competitive dance industry. Some dance competition companies require an acro routine to have a minimum of four or five tricks with at most fifty percent acrobatic content. Other companies require an acro routine to have exactly, or more than, fifty percent acrobatic content. Also, at some competitions an acro dance may fit into an explicitly defined "acro dance" performance category, while at others it may fall into a similar category such as "acro/gym," or an alternative category such as "open." Because of these differences, it may be necessary to enter a specific acro routine into different performance categories at different competitions.

== See also ==
- Acro dance moves (category)
