= Front aerial =

Acrobatic move

A front aerial, performed as part of an acro dance routine

A front aerial is an acrobatic move in which a person executes a complete forward revolution of the body without touching the floor. Front aerials are performed in various physical activities, including acro dance and gymnastics. The front aerial is known by other names, including aerial walkover, front aerial walkover, front flip and front somersault.

== Technical ==
The front aerial differs from a front tuck in that the body assumes a form similar to that of a front walkover, with legs extended and split along the plane of rotation, whereas in a front tuck the knees are bent and held against the chest (i.e., "tucked") so as to maximize rotational velocity. To compensate for lack of support from the floor, as well as the decreased rotational velocity that results from extended (versus "tucked") legs, a front aerial performer uses the inertia of the legs to keep the body aloft until the move is completed.

A front aerial can be executed either from a run or from a stationary, standing position. When starting from a standing position, a forward step is typically taken prior to the front aerial in order to develop forward momentum. In either case, at the beginning of a front aerial the performer's forward momentum is converted to the angular momentum needed for execution of the front aerial.

== Performance requirements ==
Front aerials require a great degree of lower back flexibility. From the moment a front aerial performer leaves the floor until touching down again, the torso must remain in a stationary, inverted orientation while the lower body rotates about the torso.

Adequate muscle strength is also required to execute a front aerial. In particular, the calf muscle of the leading leg is responsible for imparting additional upward momentum to the body at the final moment of launch. The total upward momentum must be sufficient to keep the performer aloft while the lower body completes its rotation about the torso.

== See also ==
- Aerial cartwheel (also called a side aerial)
