= Flip (acrobatic) =

Acrobatic jump

A front aerial performed as part of an acro dance routine

An acrobatic flip is a sequence of body movements in which a person leaps into the air and rotates one or more times while airborne. Acrobatic flips are commonly performed in acro dance, free running, gymnastics, cheerleading, high jumping, tricking, martial arts, goal celebrations, and various other activities. This contrasts with freestyle BMX flips, where a person rotates in the air along with a bicycle.

Acrobatic flips can be initiated from a stationary, standing position, but they are often executed immediately following another rotational move, such as a roundoff or handspring, to take advantage of the angular momentum generated by the preceding move. Generally, the hands do not touch the floor during the execution of a flip, and performers typically aim to land on their feet in an upright position; however, this is not required for the move to be considered a flip.

== Classification ==
Many variations of flips exist, with their usage depending on the specific type of activity. In gymnastics, for example, flips adhere to a small number of specific, rigorously defined forms and movements. However, in activities such as free running and tricking, there are seemingly endless variations of flips, many of which are derived from fundamental gymnastics flips. As a result, gymnastics terminology is often applied to flips found in other disciplines. Flips are generally categorized according to the direction of body rotation; for example, the body rotates forward (face first) in a front flip and in the opposite direction in a back flip.

=== Gymnastics ===
Gymnastics flips are performed in both men's and women's gymnastics on various apparatus, including the balance beam, vault, floor, uneven bars, pommel horse, rings, parallel bars, and high bar. In all cases, gymnastics flips require the hips to pass over the head. Four body forms are commonly used in gymnastics flips:

- Aerial – The knees are unbent, with legs in a forward or side split and aligned on the rotational plane, resulting in a front aerial or side aerial, respectively.
- Tuck – The legs are together with the knees fully bent and drawn to the chest, and the hands clutch the knees or are otherwise held close to the body. By 'tucking' tightly in this manner, the body can achieve maximum angular velocity, minimizing the time required to complete the revolution. When initiated from a stationary, standing position, a tuck is classified as a 'standing' tuck. This skill may also include a 360-degree rotation using a torque twist, in which case it is called a back tuck full.

- Layout – The body is fully extended with legs together, and the hips and knees are unbent, with arms held against the sides. Compared to a back tuck, this flip requires both higher angular momentum and greater height above the floor to ensure sufficient time to complete the rotation before landing. The flip is initiated by bringing the arms down from beside the ears to the hips, helping to initiate the flip and control the momentum for a successful landing. A layout may also include axial body rotation in addition to the fundamental rotation about the waist; such a layout is called a twist. Twists are further categorized by the number of axial rotations completed while airborne. For example, a layout with a 180-degree twist is a half twist, 360 degrees for a full twist, and multiples of 360 degrees for double full and triple full twists, and so on.
- Pike – The hips are bent, with the knees straight and the legs together.

Many gymnastics flips are descriptively named based on the direction of rotation and the body position assumed during execution. For example, a front flip performed with a tucked body position is called a front tuck. When initiated from a stationary, standing position, it is referred to as a standing front tuck.

== Variations ==
Acro dancers perform a pitch tuck.

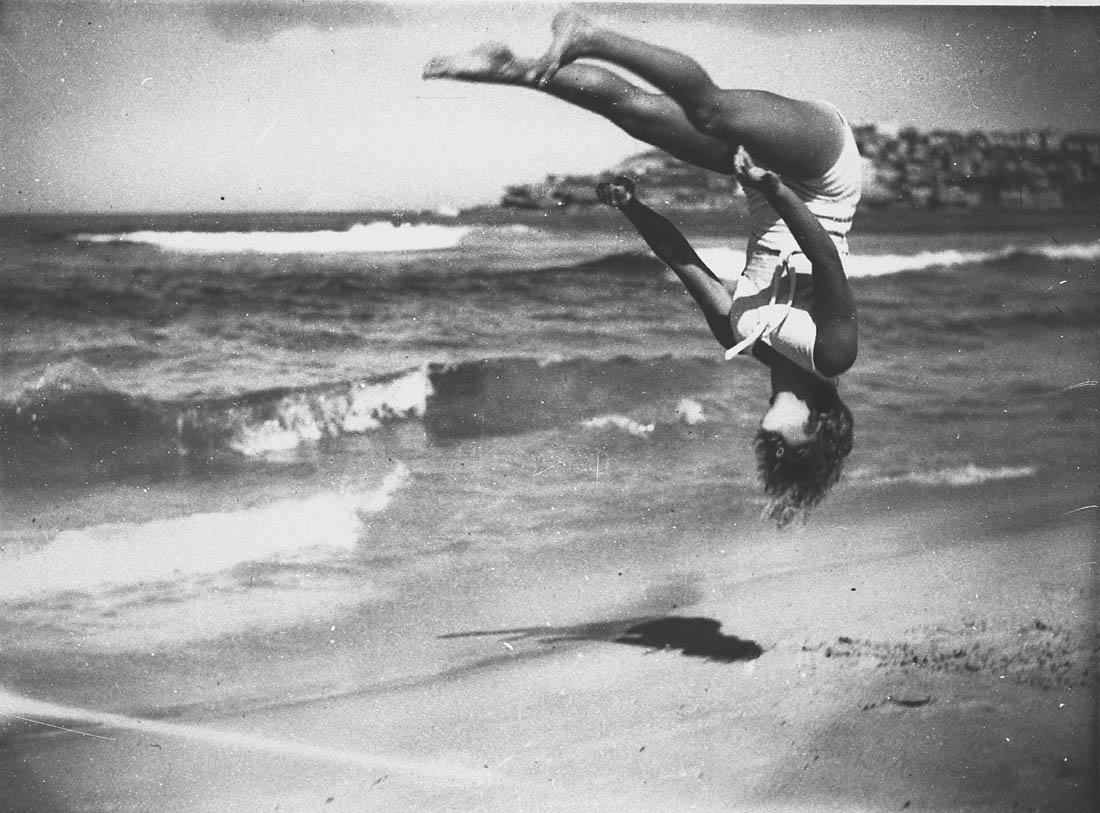
Peggy Bacon is airborne while executing a variation of a back pike, with legs apart. Bondi Beach, 1937.

=== Common modifications ===
These modifications can be applied to many types of flips:

- Gainer – A back flip that ends with the performer moving forward from the starting point due to forward momentum.
- Loser – A front flip that ends with the performer moving behind the starting position due to backward momentum.
- Switch – A flip that is launched from and lands on the same leg.

=== Tucks ===
- Pitch tuck – An assisted back tuck performed with partners. One partner forms a 'saddle' with their hands. The second partner steps onto the saddle, and then the first partner thrusts the saddle upward. The second partner, propelled upward with backward rotation, executes a back tuck.
- Cowboy tuck – A tuck with the knees and feet separated.
- Arabian – A tucking flip that begins with a backward rotation but changes into a front tuck after take-off with a half twist.

=== Layouts ===
- X-in or X-out – In these variations, the legs and arms are split perpendicular to the rotational plane to form an 'X.'
- Layout or Straight – In this variation, the performer's legs are kept together and relatively straight while being whipped over the head.
- Stepout - In this variation, the legs split mid-flip and the legs land one at a time than at the same time.

=== Tricking and B-Boying ===
A virtually unlimited number of flip variants have emerged across various activities, many with proprietary nomenclature.

== See also ==
- Handspring (gymnastics)
- Somersault
