= Front walkover =

Acrobatic move

A one-handed front walkover performed during an acro dance

A front walkover is an acrobatic movement sequence. It begins with the performer standing up straight with arms raised and positioned near to the ears. The performer then lunges forward and quickly raises one leg, with the other leg following as if transitioning to a handstand. The legs are held straight in a split as they travel overhead. The back is then arched until the leading foot touches the floor, such that the performer is briefly in a back bridge position. After the trailing foot reaches the floor, the performer returns to a standing position. In gymnastics, a front walkover typically ends with one foot extended in front and arms raised. Front walkovers are performed in various activities, including acro dance, circus, and gymnastics.

== See also ==
- Back walkover
- Front aerial
- Front limber
