= Back walkover =

A valdez, performed by an acro dancer

A back walkover is an acrobatic maneuver in which a person transitions from a standing position to a back bridge and then back to a standing position again, undergoing a complete revolution of the body in the process. Back walkovers are commonly performed in a variety of athletic activities, including acro dance, cheerleading, and rhythmic gymnastics. In artistic gymnastics, back walkovers are performed in floor exercises and on the balance beam.

== Technique ==
The back walkover performer begins in a standing position. The back is increasingly arched and abdominal muscles are stretched until the hands touch the floor and all hands and feet are flat on the floor, thus forming a gymnastic back bridge. While in the bridge position, one leg (the leading leg) is rapidly raised from the floor so as to impart momentum to the lower body. This momentum lifts the trailing leg from the floor so that only the hands are left touching the floor. Both hands remain on the floor while the body revolves backward through a handstand position, until the foot of the leading leg, followed by the foot of the trailing leg, reach the floor. When both feet are on the floor, the performer returns to an erect standing position.

== Variations ==
- In a one-handed walkover, only one hand is placed on the floor.
- A valdez is a back walkover that begins in a sitting position.
- A backwards kickover or bridge kickover is a back walkover with a pause in the bridge position.

== See also ==
- Front walkover
