= Aerial cartwheel =

Acrobatic move

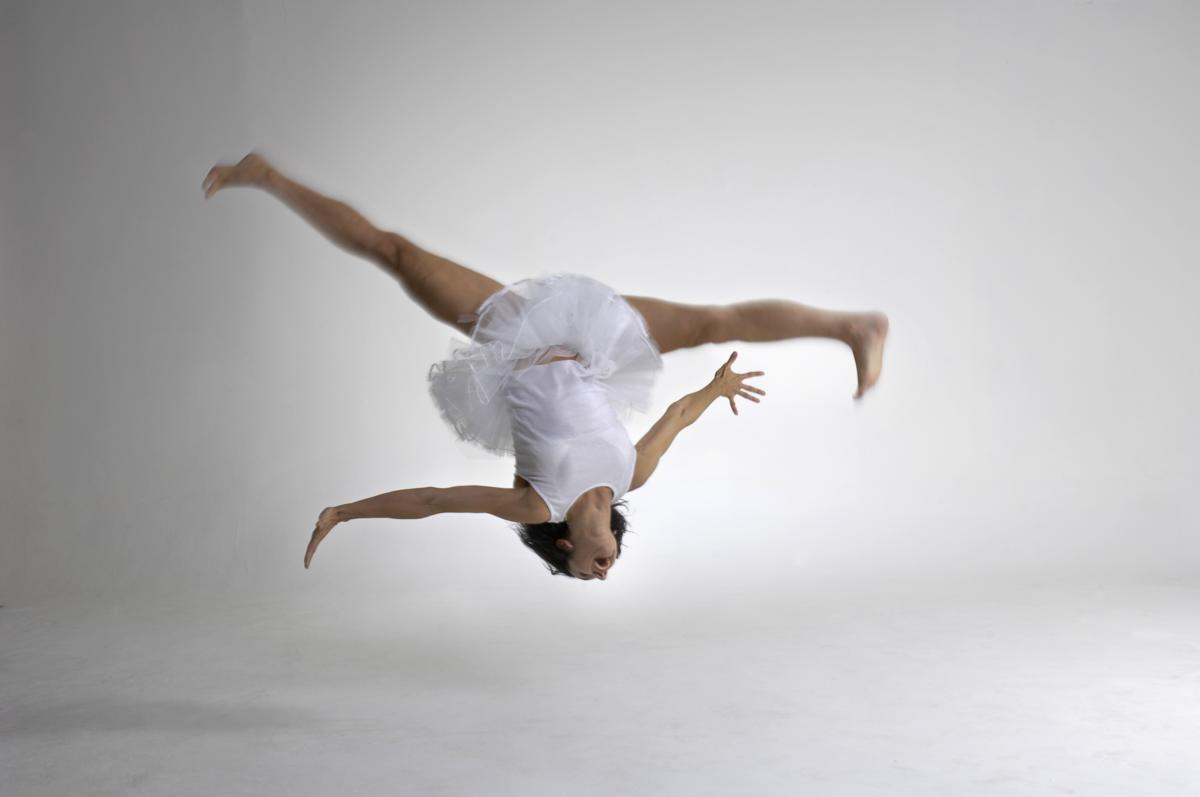
A dancer in mid-air performing an aerial cartwheel

An aerial cartwheel or side aerial is an acrobatic move in which a cartwheel is executed without touching hands to the floor. During the execution of a standard cartwheel, the performer's body is supported by the hands while transitioning through the inverted orientation whereas an aerial cartwheel, performer is airborne while inverted. To compensate for lack of support from the hands, leg momentum is employed to keep the performer airborne until the leading foot touches down. Aerial cartwheels can be executed while running or from a stationary, standing position. The front leg lunges and the back leg drives back creating momentum. Aerial cartwheels are also known by various other names, including side flip, side somersault, air cartwheel, no-hands cartwheels, or simply aerials.

Aerial cartwheels are performed in gymnastics, cheerleading, acro dance, free running, tricking, and martial arts such as wushu and capoeira. In a martial arts context, the aerial cartwheel is visually interesting but of little value to combatants. Consequently, it is commonly seen in martial arts exhibitions, performances, and movies, but seldom used in sparring matches and fights.

== Learning the proper technique ==
Learning the proper technique and taking classes to learn about the skill reduces the chance of acquiring an injury. Aerials can be properly taught in gymnastics, dance, aerobic, martial arts, cheer, and tumbling classes. Classes have an instructor that can properly teach the steps for completing an aerial and the equipment to guide the learning process which reduces the chance of developing an injury. An aerial cartwheel involves intense coordination, concentration, balance, strength, flexibility, stamina, and power. Strength training and stretching helps develop the structure prior to trying the exercise to make the performance easier.

== Variations ==
- Tucked aerial, in which legs are tucked, resulting in faster rotation. This is similar to the capoiera skill Aú sem Mão.
- Side somi, similar to a tucked aerial, but the legs are held in the tucked position and there is a 90-degree rotation.
- Axe to aerial, in which a leg is raised to shoulder or head height and then swung down (in a fashion similar to an axe kick), whereupon it becomes the leading leg of an aerial. A variant of this where the practitioner lands in the splits was popularized by Willem Stockton and was even called by some the Willem Aerial.
- Aeriola, also known as a reverse aerial, is an aerial preceded by a backward step, resulting in backward travel during the aerial.
- Barani, also known as a free round-off, in which legs are brought together in mid-air, landing on both feet.
- Gardiner, also known as aerial switch, in which the trailing leg swings ahead of the leading leg so as to become the first to land.
- Aerial to the splits. Most aerial variants can terminate in the splits.

== See also ==
- Front aerial
- Somersault
