= Somersault =

Acrobatic exercise

Front tucked somersault animation

A somersault (also flip, heli, and in gymnastics salto) is an acrobatic exercise in which a person's body rotates 360° around a horizontal axis with the feet passing over the head. A somersault can be performed backwards, forwards or sideways and can be executed in the air or on the ground. When performed on the ground, it is typically called a roll.

== Etymology ==
The word 'somersault' is derived from Old Provençal sobresaut (via Middle French sombresault) meaning "jump over", from sobre, "over" (from Latin supra-, as in supranational); and saut, "jump" (from Latin saltus, the same root as salient).

== Types ==
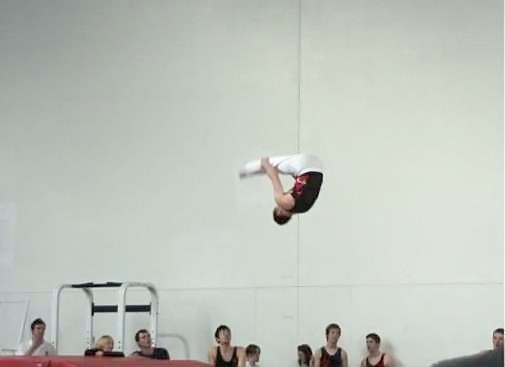
Front somersault in the pike position

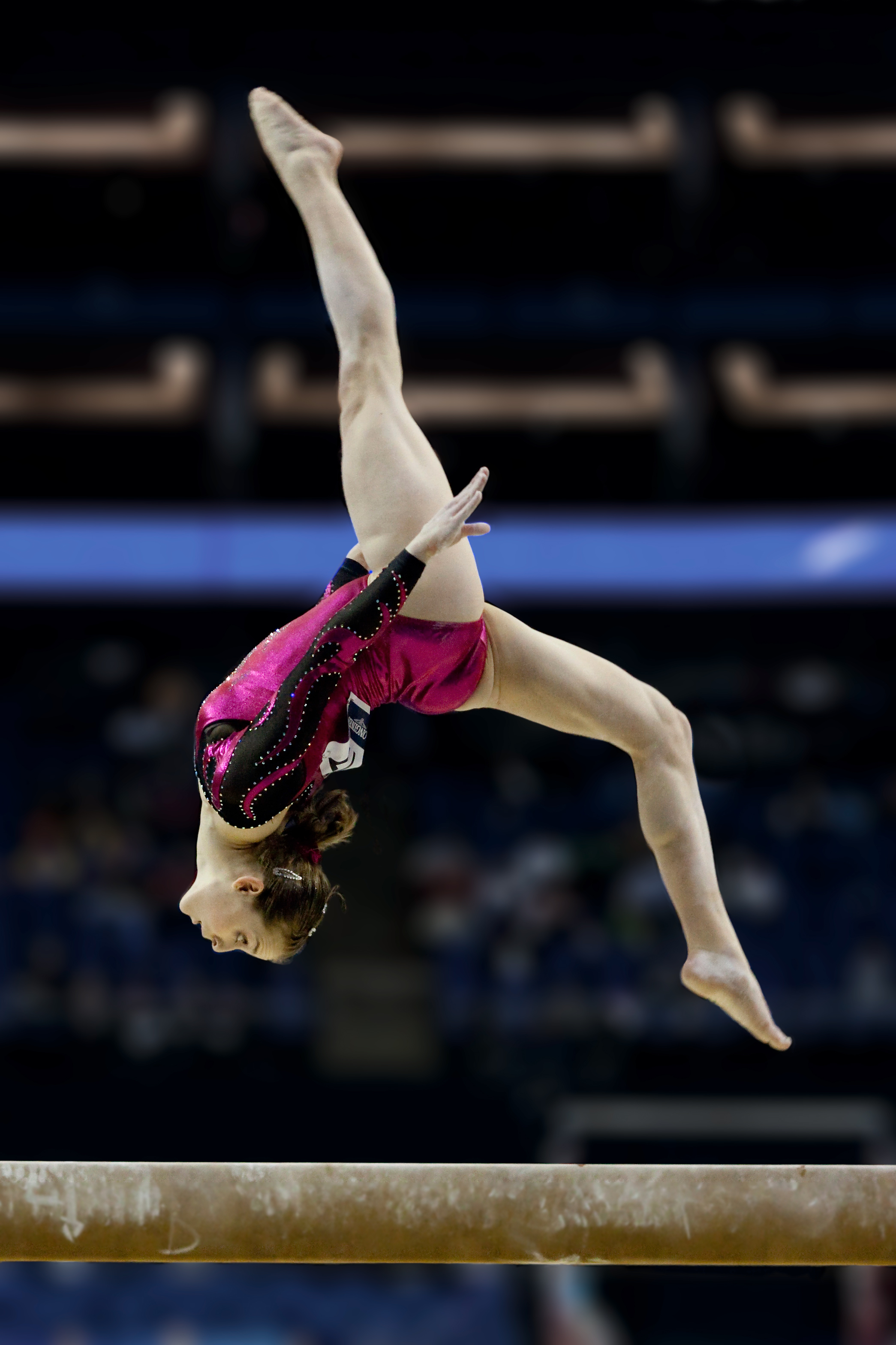
Back somersault on one foot

=== Body positions ===
Somersaults may be performed with different positions, including tucked, piked (bent at the hips), straddled, and layout (straight body). Somersaults are often completed with twists.

=== Direction ===
Tumbling, a discipline of Trampoline Gymastics, does not require participants to combine both front and back elements, and most tumblers prefer back tumbling as it is easier to build momentum.

Arabian saltos begin backwards, continue with a half twist to forwards, and end with one or more saltos forwards. They can be trained by beginning with an Arabian dive roll and adding a front salto to it. They are counted as front tumbling in women's artistic gymnastics and back tumbling in men's artistic gymnastics.

=== Multiple rotations ===
By 2003, the tucked double back salto had become common in women's gymnastics. The triple back salto exists in men's gymnastics but was rarely competed until 2017.

In 2019, American gymnast Simone Biles was the first woman to complete a back triple double: two saltos backwards with three twists in a tucked position on the floor. The skill was first performed four decades (1964) earlier in Trampoline Gymnastics – where the skill is named a "miller", after its creator Wayne Miller. Subsequent skills have since been coined: "miller plus" (or "killer")—double somersault with four twists throughout—and "miller plus plus" (or "thriller")—double somersault with five twists throughout.

== See also ==
- Aerial cartwheel
- Cartwheel (gymnastics)
- Roll (gymnastics)
- Trampolining
- Tumbling
- Parkour
- Handspring
- Diving
- Tumble turn
