= Double Leg (trick) =

Martial arts technique

A Double Leg is a move that originated from Capoeira, but was incorporated into tricking like many other martial arts moves due to its difficulty and aesthetics. Its Capoeira name is Armada Dupla, which means a double armada. An Armada is the capoeira version of a Reverse Roundhouse kick. The distinguishing feature of this move is the fact that both legs remain together during the take off and execution; its name is derived from this feature. After the take off, the torso stays upright and vertical, but will begin to quickly torque in order to swing the legs around and upwards. At the peak of this move, the body is in the shape of a "V". The legs continue to swing over as the body straightens out for the landing.

In tricking, this move can be done from a run, a step in, a standing position, or from another move in a combo. A standing position and linking it in or at the end of a combo are more difficult due to the height and amount of torque needed. In Capoeira, it can be done from a ginga or another move in a combo.

A similar move is also performed in snowboarding and inline skating and is referred to as a Misty Flip.

== Variations ==
- Single Leg Double Leg
  While the take off is still done with both legs, during the execution, one of the legs (either one) is tucked in. Normally the knees are still together, so the motion is all but identical. Since the appearance resembles a regular Double Leg or, depending on the angle of the body and which leg is extended, a 540 kick or 360 Crescent kick, it is typically not considered a standard trick. These variant are more for practicing spatial awareness and body control to be used for more standard tricking.
- Double Leg to the splits
  A standard Double Leg and its variants can be landed into the splits instead of a solid two foot landing.
- Split Double Leg
  This is where the legs are split apart while in midair. One leg is closer to the torso while the other is further away from the torso. The practitioner normally will have to lay their body a bit more horizontal in order to make room for the leg splits. The landing and take off are the same as a standard double leg.
- Scissor Double Leg
  This is very similar to a Split Double Leg in that the legs split while in midair. However, after the initial split, the legs perform a switch that creates a scissor-like effect.
- Misty Twisty
  This variant is a combination of a Double Leg and a Butterfly Twist. The practitioner will begin a Double Leg, but once they have reached the peak of the move, they will straighten out their body horizontally and start to rotate their body 360° and finish it as a Twist. This move is comparable to a 540 Twist or a Cheat 720 Twist. The name was derived from the snowboarding Misty Flip.
- Kim Do Kick/Double Leg X Out
  Given the unusual nature of this kick, it is arguable whether or not this move is a variant of the Double Leg or of another trick. It does however share similar mechanics to a Double Leg. This move was popularized and for all intents and purposes created by Kim Do Nguyen. It starts out very similar to a Double leg in that the take off is done with both legs and the initial torque of the trick is also similar. Once the body is in the air, it lays more horizontally and both legs will kick outwards like a "V". The kick out is done at the peak height to create a stall in the momentum and gives the temporary appearance of floating in mid-trick. The longer the legs are held in the kick position, the longer the stall. The legs are then brought back in to regain the lost momentum and to help reposition the body for a safe land. Kim Do Nguyen would normally land this trick into a kneeling position, but others have landed this on both feet by cutting the stall shorter.

== See also ==
- List of capoeira techniques
