= Moon kick =

A moon kick, commonly referred to as Kick the Moon, is a type of gainer trick used in martial arts and tricking. It is sometimes confused with a flashkick which is similar.

== Variations ==
Note that different people may refer to the variations below using different names since there are no official or standardized names.

- Spinning Setup Moon Kick

The moon kick itself is preceded by an extra spin to gain momentum.

- Swinging Moon Kick

This moon kick is accompanied by swinging of the arms.

- J-Step Moon Kick

The path of the run before the moon kick is in the shape of the English letter "J".

== History ==
The moon kick originated as a variation of the gainer flash trick. Eventually it gained its own name which came from the motion in which the person performing it kicks "towards the Moon", or in an upward direction.

== See also ==
- Gainer (sports)
