= Butterfly kick =

Jumping kick in martial arts

An amateur video of a basic butterfly kick

A butterfly kick or horse kick (Chinese: 旋子; pinyin: xuànzi; lit. 'circle') is a jumping kick in martial arts such as modern wushu, taekwondo and capoeira. In certain changquan styles, this kick is known as Swallow Kick (Yianzi tui).

Although the specific nature of the kick varies, it is generally composed of a twist of the body while both legs are lifted from the ground and swung around, while the torso remains as horizontal as possible. In action cinema it is often seen as a kick used to "cut a swathe" through multiple opponents. In traditional Chinese longfist, it is used defensively to evade an opponent's floor sweep and land on the enemy's vulnerable side. There are many variations, and different movements may be captured under the same name or likewise similar movements given under a different name depending on the martial arts school or style. It can be executed either from standing or from a step up run.

The name "butterfly kick" is due to the legs reaching the apex of their arc the arms are stretched out, leaving all limbs extended in a position similar to that of a butterfly's wings in-flight.

== Variants ==
A taekwondo student demonstrates a butterfly kick variant.

There are many butterfly kick variants, as each student adopts slightly different maneuvers and style depending on his specific martial arts background. For example, a wushu-derived butterfly kick would be somewhat more graceful compared to a tae kwon do-derived kick, which would have a more dynamic, energetic look.

Butterfly Twist
Also known simply as a twist, this is a move that is very popular within the tricking community due to its floating and twisting motion, as well as its ability to easily link into other moves. It is used in various martial arts, including Wushu and Capoeira. Its wushu name is xuàn zi zhuàn tǐ, and its Capoeira name is "mariposa" which literally means "butterfly". A butterfly twist can be described as a butterfly kick where a 360° spin is added once one is in the air.
HK Spin
A derivative of the butterfly twist, which is essentially the same move, but the person delivering the move falls onto the ground horizontally. This is not usually performed as a trick, but is commonly used as a type of fall in fight choreography. HK spins are named so because they were popularized in Hong Kong martial arts films. 360° and 720° spins are the two most common, though 1080° spins have been done in the past but the fall was from an elevated surface to a lower surface.
Corkscrew
This trick is considered related to the butterfly twist due to the original takeoff used, however a less traditional variant which uses a J-Step/J-Turn (more common among trickers) has also been developed. The practitioner will take a few quick steps in an arc-shape and, when ready, throw a leg in the air. Along with thrusting the arms upward, this helps to lift the body off the ground. When sufficient height has been achieved, the individual will turn their body towards the "inside" of the kicking leg (similar to an inside crescent), executing approximately 540 degrees of rotation, to land on the non-kicking leg.
Illusion Twist
Begins almost identically to a normal twist, however the body begins to up right itself during mid-execution. This is because a crescent kick is thrown with the last leg to take off. The kick is thrown in a very fast whipping motion that brings the body upright and facing forward. Another distinguishing feature of this kick is that both feet generally land at the same time.
Hyper Twist
This move adds an additional 90-180 degrees of rotation to the twist. The defining characteristic of this move is the fact that the landing is done with the other leg. Because of the setup of the feet created by this landing, it is possible to immediately go into another butterfly, twist, or other variant.
Hyper Hook
Essentially a Hyper Twist with a hook kick thrown after the landing leg has swung over into position for a landing.

=== Multi-rotation variants ===
Some variants add additional rotation(s) to the standard Butterfly twist. The extra twisting generally requires faster twisting of the body, more torque and extra height in order to land safely.

720 Twist
This is essentially a normal twist but rotates 720° instead of 360°. Variants of this include, 720 Hyper Twists, 720 Twists to the splits, and a hybrid twist to gyro —begins as a twist, rotates 360°, continues spinning in the air as it uprights to 360 gyro.
Cheat 720 Twist (540 Twist)
Practically every variant of the twist begins with the lead leg of the body taking off last. With a 720 Cheat, the take off is very similar to a standard 540 kick except that it lies a bit more horizontal. After rotating about 180° in the air, the body then the assumes the normal mechanics of a standard twist, add twists a total of 540°.
1080 Twist
A triple butterfly twist. The first successfully recorded and landed Triple Butterfly Twist was done by John Vanek.
California Roll
Is Cheat 720 twist with an added rotation, or a Cheat 1080 twist. The take off is very similar to a Cheat 720, but instead of twisting 540°, the practitioner twists 900°.

== Popularity ==
The kick's remarkable appearance has allowed the kick to be utilized in a wide range of performing arts such as breakdancing, tricking, martial arts films, various video games (such as the Tekken series, the Mortal Kombat series and The Matrix Online), gymnastics and even on the ice as seen in Olympics figure skating. It has also appeared in the sport of professional wrestling by trained martial artists like Low Ki. It also appeared in The Phantom Menace as one of Darth Maul's signature techniques, Ray Park being a wushu champion. The Butterfly kick holds a unique position in the acrobatic world for being a traditional defensive move incorporated into the modern popular arts and international sports.

== See also ==
- Kick
