= Barani flip =

Aerial maneuver in various sports

A Barani flip or Barani is an aerial maneuver consisting of a front flip and a half twist. This trick is performed in number of sports including but not limited to dancing, gymnastics, cheerleading, trampoline, cliff diving, wrestling, aggressive inline skating, and freerunning. A barani is an aerial somersault flip, used as a trick for flyers, dancers, high divers and snowboarders. It is used as an official move in gymnastics, tumbling, and freerunning. The 180 degree turn is carried out usually halfway through the frontflip. The reason why it is used in so many sports is that it converts a regular frontflip (during which one can not see the ground or water for the landing) into a move in which one turns in time so that the last half of the flip is done in the same way as a backflip (during which one can see the ground or water). It therefore allows for greater control of the landing.

In gymnastics, some coaches describe a Barani as a roundoff without hands or, mostly on beam, a front somersault with a half twist.

It is named after Italian circus acrobat and tumbler Alfonso Baroni, who performed the trick around 1881.

== Similar tricks ==
- Misty Flip (snowboarding)
- McTwist (skateboarding / snowboarding)
- Roundoff (gymnastics)
