= Double Leg =

The term double leg can refer to the follow:

- Double Leg (trick) – a Capoeira move also known as an armada dupla.
- Double leg takedown – a martial arts and combat sports technique for taking the opponent to the ground.
