= Gainer flash =

Martial arts move

A gainer flash is a move frequently used in the martial arts sport of tricking. The move consists of the performer doing a gainer while executing a flashkick.

Description: A trick in which a person performs a Gainer with a front stretch kick coming out of it. It is essentially a Flash Kick from a Gainer setup instead of a "pop" setup.
