= Tricking (martial arts) =

Acrobatic discipline

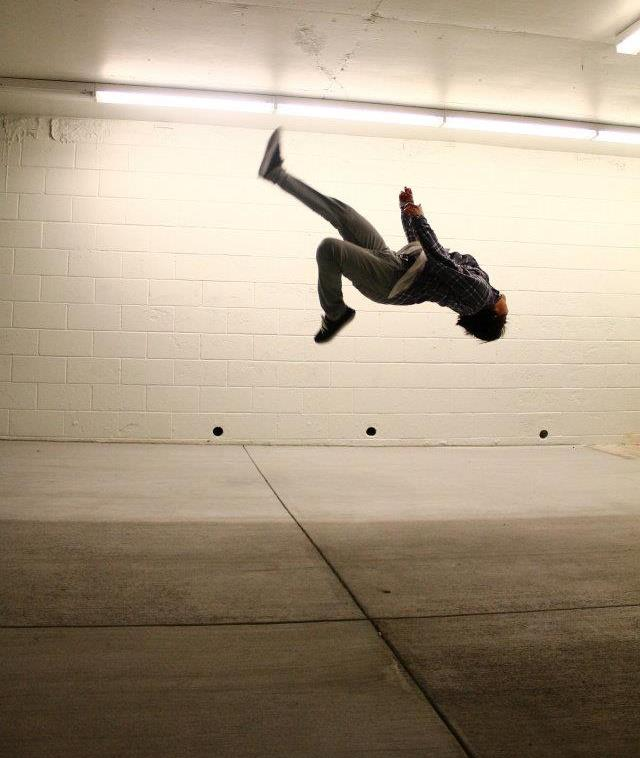
World-renowned Vietnamese kung fu dancer Julian Bui performing a flashkick.

Tricking is an acrobatic sport that combines kicks with flips and twists from martial arts and gymnastics as well as many dance moves and styles from dance. Though it is a conventional martial art itself, its fundamentals borrow techniques in traditional martial arts mainly from Taekwondo, and also share roots in Wushu as well as Capoeira. Recently, Tricking has expanded into other martial arts such as Shaolin kung fu and Karate.

It aims to achieve an aesthetic display of different combinations of "tricks". Tricking practitioners are commonly referred to as "Trickers". Examples of Tricking techniques include the 540 kick, the corkscrew (cork), the flashkick, the butterfly twist and the double leg.

== History ==
A tendency to exhibit techniques that are more flashy and complex was observed in martial arts during the period following the 1960s, predating the current Tricking movement. Found especially in Taekwondo, an increasing emphasis on spectacular spinning, jumping or flying kicks developed during the mid-1960s with the introduction of international competitions.

The actual sport of Tricking is an internet phenomenon, emerging in the early 2000s. Xtreme Martial Arts is thought to be a close precursor to the sport, being shown at various martial arts tournaments in the 90s and early 2000s. By late 2003, the online Tricking community was well-developed, bringing trickers from across the globe together. With the rise of YouTube, trickers were able to share their videos with others, and the discipline experienced a massive rise in popularity and interest.

== Progression ==
A Tricker demonstrates a characteristic Tricking move, the Corkscrew.

Unlike many established sports, Tricking has no formal rules or regulations, and there are no governing bodies that regulate the sport. Strictly speaking, participants are free to perform any kind of dramatic maneuver and call it a 'trick' - though there are certain moves that are generally accepted as Tricking moves. Some practitioners (especially those who discover Tricking through the Internet) tend to learn the easier moves first (such as the 540 kick, aerial, kip-up, and backflip) and try to progress through a list of recognized tricks in the perceived order of difficulty. However, how difficult a trick is, varies from person to person; certain tricks may be inexplicably easier or harder than normal for a particular tricker to learn.

Trickers can be divided into different categories of style: some prefer performing mainly martial arts tricks (which almost always incorporate kicks into a trick), others mostly freestyle gymnastics and flips (mainly focus on combining different types of rotations and twists), but most trickers combine moves from both of the disciplines. Trickers regularly train their bodies hard to be able to perform their tricks at any time consistently.

== Mechanics ==
=== Contact Twisting ===
In traditional sports that contain rotational maneuvers, like gymnastics or high diving, twist rotation is mostly initiated using aerial twisting techniques. Freestyle disciplines, including breakdancing, calisthenics, Capoeira, contemporary dance, freestyle skiing, snowboarding, freerunning, Tricking, are believed to mostly use contact twisting. A recent, yet unpublished study using motion capture data of over 300 Tricking combos from multiple participants found that the horizontal (flip) and vertical (twist) components of the total angular momentum vector are exactly equal on average during Tricking, indicating a high degree of contact twisting. Contact twisting has the following advantages for Tricking:

- Maximization of twist rotation
- Foot clearance during swings due to body tilt
- Inclusion of kicks

== Trick Lists ==
Category	Prerequisites	Tricks Name	Description	Variation
Flipping
Rolls		Forward Rolls	Roll forward starting from feet	Dive Roll, 360 Dive Roll, Webster Dive Roll
		Backward Rolls	Roll backward starting from feet	Arabian Dive Roll
Handspring	Handstand + Forward Rolls	Front Handspring	Forward Flip using hands and Feet In Handstand Position	Flyspring
	Bridge stretch + Backwards Rolls	Back Handspring	Backwards Flip using hands and Feet In Handstand Position	360 Back Handspring
	Handstand	Cartwheel	Sideways Rolls using hands and Feet In Handstand Position	Roundoff, Single handed Cartwheel, Helicopter
Flips	Forward Rolls	Front Flips	Forward Flip starting from feet landing on feet	Front Half, Front Full, Rudi...
	Front Flips	Webster	Single legged Front Flips	Webster Dive Roll
	Backward Rolls	Back Flips	Backwards Flip starting from feet landing on feet	Back Layout
	Back Flips	Gainer	Single-legged Back Flips	Cheat Gainer
	Gainer	Gainer Flash	Also known as Flash Kick, a Gainer with a Flash Kick	
	Gainer	Moon Kick	A Gainer with a Hook Kick	
	Side Rolls + Front Flips	Side Flips	Sideways Flip starting from feet landing on feet with head on flat axis	Side Flips fulls,
	Cartwheel	Aerial	A Cartwheel without using both hands, by facing front or side	Front Aerial, Side Aerial
Kicking
Basic		Round Kick		
		Hook Kick		
		Front Sweep	Mostly uses as a transitional move	
		Back Sweep	Mostly uses as a transitional move	
	Round Kick	Crescent Kick		
	Hook Kick	Compasso		
		Butterfly Kick (B-Kick)	Also known as B-Kick	
> 180°	Pop + Crescent Kick	360 Kick	Also known as Tornado Kick	Cheat 360, Pop 360
	360 Kick + Hook kick	540 Kick (pop 10)	1.5 Twisting Hook Kick	Cheat 540, Pop 540
	540 Kick + Round Kick	720 Kick (pop 12)	Double Twisting Round Kick	Cheat 720, Pop 720
Twisting
	Half twist	Full Twist	A 360° twist	
	Butterfly Kick + Full Twist	Butterfly Twist	A Butterfly Kick with a 360° twist	
	Gainer + Full Twist	Corkscrew (Cork)	A Gainer with a 360° twist	
Set-ups
	Cartwheel	Scoot	one-handed Lunge into 180	
		Cheat Step	An additional 180° step before tricks, mostly use in Kicking	
		J - Step	alternating steps into swing	
		Euro Step	single leg Jump landing back on the same leg into swing	
	Master Scoot, Gumbi	Raiz	alternating steps into front half	
	Raiz	Touch Down Raiz (TDR)	A powerful Setup used in advanced tricks	

== See also ==
- Parkour
- Freerunning
