= Flashkick =

A flashkick is a type of back flip that is performed in the martial art of tricking, usually performed with one leg extended and the other tucked. As with many other types of back flips, a flashkick may be started from a stationary standing position or immediately following another similar move, such as a roundoff.

== Variations ==
- Flash switch: In this variation, also known as double flash or scissor kick flip, the legs are reversed (i.e., "switched") while in mid-air.
- Triple flash: This variation—which is also known as flash double switch or double kick scissor flip—is similar to a flash switch, but has two leg reversals instead of one. Popularized by Steve Terada.
- X-Out flash: Begins as a standard X-Out, but the legs split in the direction of body rotation immediately after leaving the ground.
- Gainer Flash: Similar to a gainer, but with split legs.
- Flash kick to the splits: Instead of landing on both feet, the performer lands in a split position. This ending variation is applicable to all other variations of flashkicks.

== History ==
The term Flash Kick originated from a move performed by Guile and Charlie Nash from the Street Fighter video game series, in which a flash of light accompanied the move. In game, the character would execute a Flash Kick in order to counter an airborne opponent.

== See also ==
- Somersault
- Gymnastics
