= 360 Crescent kick =

Martial arts kick

The 360 Crescent kick is a martial arts kick that received its name from the motion of the kick itself. It is also sometimes called, 360 kick, or Jump spin kick. The practitioner jumps into the air and executes a 360 degree turn while keeping his or her body perpendicular to the ground. As soon as the kicker leaves the ground, the kicking leg should be extended as straight and high as possible. The kicking leg is normally the same side as the direction that the practitioner is spinning. For example, it will be the right leg if the practitioner is spinning to the right or the left leg if the practitioner is spinning to the left.

== Variations ==
The different variations depend solely on the position of the hips and the direction the toes of the kicking foot are pointing. The mechanics of all the variations are basically unchanged from what is described above.

- 360 Crescent

Here the toes are pointing either directly up or straight forward. If aiming for a target, the target is hit with either the blade of the foot (outer edge from heel to pinky toe) or with the side of the heel. The hips rotate completely around, generating a good amount of power and speed; however, the reach is somewhat shortened by the position of the body.

- 360 Hook

Here, the toes are pointing in the direction opposite to the direction the heel of the foot is moving. When aiming for a target, the target is hit with the heel of the foot, or possibly the flat of the foot, depending on the material of the target. The hips do not rotate as much as a crescent, but it is easier to obtain a farther reach this way. Because of the way the hips rotate, the body bends towards the direction opposite of the kick, sometimes making it difficult for beginners to maintain balance on the landing. This kick is sometimes called a Jumping reverse roundhouse kick

- 360 Split Hook Kick

Also known as a Helicopter Kick, the distinguishing feature of this kick is that the practitioner does the splits in midair. After completing approximately 180 degrees of the rotation, both legs are kicked outward in opposite directions. Because the legs are thrown in opposite directions, a stall in the rotation is created, which can give the appearance of floating. Once the legs are brought back in, the rotation can be partially recovered to finish the landing. Some practitioners do not recover the rotation for stylistic purposes. Jean-Claude Van Damme was well known for executing this kick in many of his movies.

- Split Kick to Hook

Though not widely practiced or even officially named, the Split kick to Hook kick still shares some similarities to a traditional 360 kick. First, the practitioner will jump and execute a basic split kick, where both legs are kicked out in opposite directions, similar to snap kicks. Immediately afterwards, the practitioner will begin to rotate their body to swing one of their legs around into a hook kick. Although the body does not rotate a full 360 degrees, it must rotate significantly more than 180 degrees to be properly executed. This move was developed by Anthony Atkins.

- 360 to the Splits

All variations of the 360 can be landed in the splits; however, the more the hips rotate, the easier it is to set it up. Once the kicking leg has executed the kick, it is swung back while the other leg is maneuvered forward.

- 360 Gyro

This is simply a normal 360 kick where an additional 360 degrees of spinning is executed after the kick, effectively spinning 720 degrees. A 360 Gyro is normally executed as a crescent, mainly because of the easier rotation of the hips after the kick. This is comparable to a 720 kick.

=== 720 kicks ===
A derivative of the 360 kick is the 720 kick. The mechanics of 720s are all but identical to 360s. The only real difference is that the amount of torque and height needed to execute a 720 is greater than that necessary for a 360. Although the name implies 720 degrees of rotation, the move is usually done with approximately 540 degrees of rotation. This happens cause the tricking terms often count the step in part of the move as actual rotation. The 720 also has some variants.

- 720 Crescent

Also known as simply a 720, this is very similar to a 360 gyro in that the degree of rotation is the same. The main difference is that the spinning is executed first, then the kick is thrown out (which is normally a hook kick due to the smaller amount of rotation needed). Many tricksters execute a Cheat 720 or a 540 wheel in place of this move due to the extra amount of rotation needed.

- 720 Double

The distinguishing feature of this move is that the crescent and/or hook kick is thrown twice, once after the first rotation of 360 degrees and again during the last rotation. Because the kick is thrown with the same leg, the difficulty of this move comes from retracting the leg towards the body just enough to throw the second kick.

- 720 Triple

Three kicks are executed much like a 720 double. The third kick is actually added in between the two from the 720 double. After the first kick is thrown, the opposite leg will throw either a crescent or a roundhouse kick. This is then followed by the second hook kick. The order and appearance of the kicks are very comparable to those of a 540 triple. The main and definitively distinguishing feature is that a 720 triple's take off is done by jumping off of both legs.

=== 1080 kicks ===
Yet another derivative of the 360 kick is the 1080 kick. It is the same principle as a 720 except that there are two and a half spins plus the step in, instead of one and a half, hence the name "1080". While theoretically all the variations of the original 360 kick are applicable to a 1080 kick, there are actually a few variations of a 1080 that have been successfully executed. Some of them include the 1080 Double and the Cheat 1080. Some tricking practitioners, such as Gary Ip, have already broken the mark of the 1260 kick, which involves approximately three spins in the air executing a round/crescent kick before the non-kicking foot hits the ground. Because of the difficulty of this move, it is often performed only by those who already have years of kicking/Martial Arts training.
