= Flying kick =

Type of kick

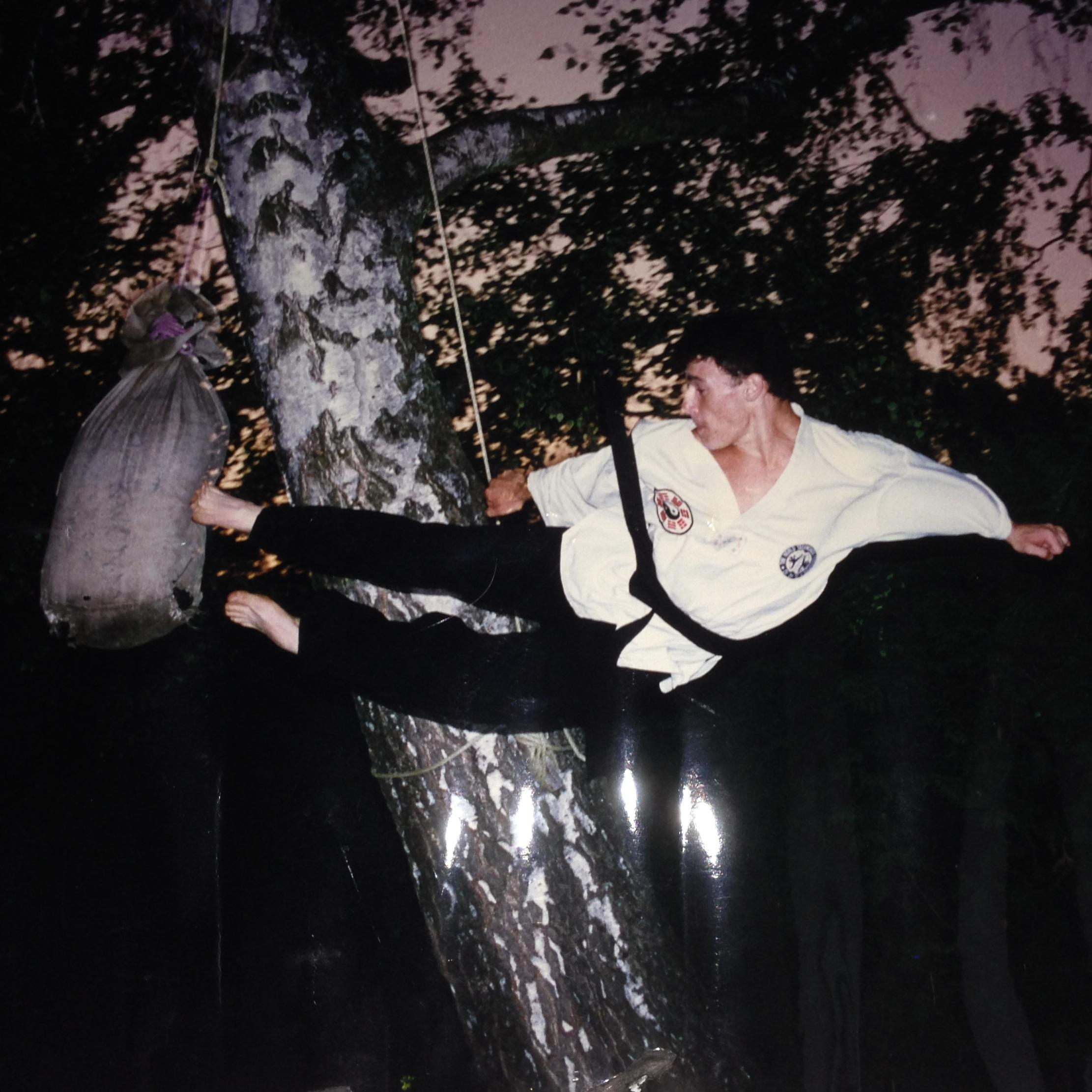
Flying kick performed by a black belt

A jump kick is a type of kick in certain martial arts and in martial-arts based gymnastics, with the particularity that the kick is delivered mid-air, specifically moving ("flying") into the target after a running start to gain forward momentum. In this sense, a "Jump kick" is a special case of a flying kick, any kick delivered in mid-air, i.e. with neither foot touching the ground.

Flying and jump kicks are taught in certain Asian martial arts, such as karate, kenpo, kalarippayattu, kung fu and taekwondo.

== History ==
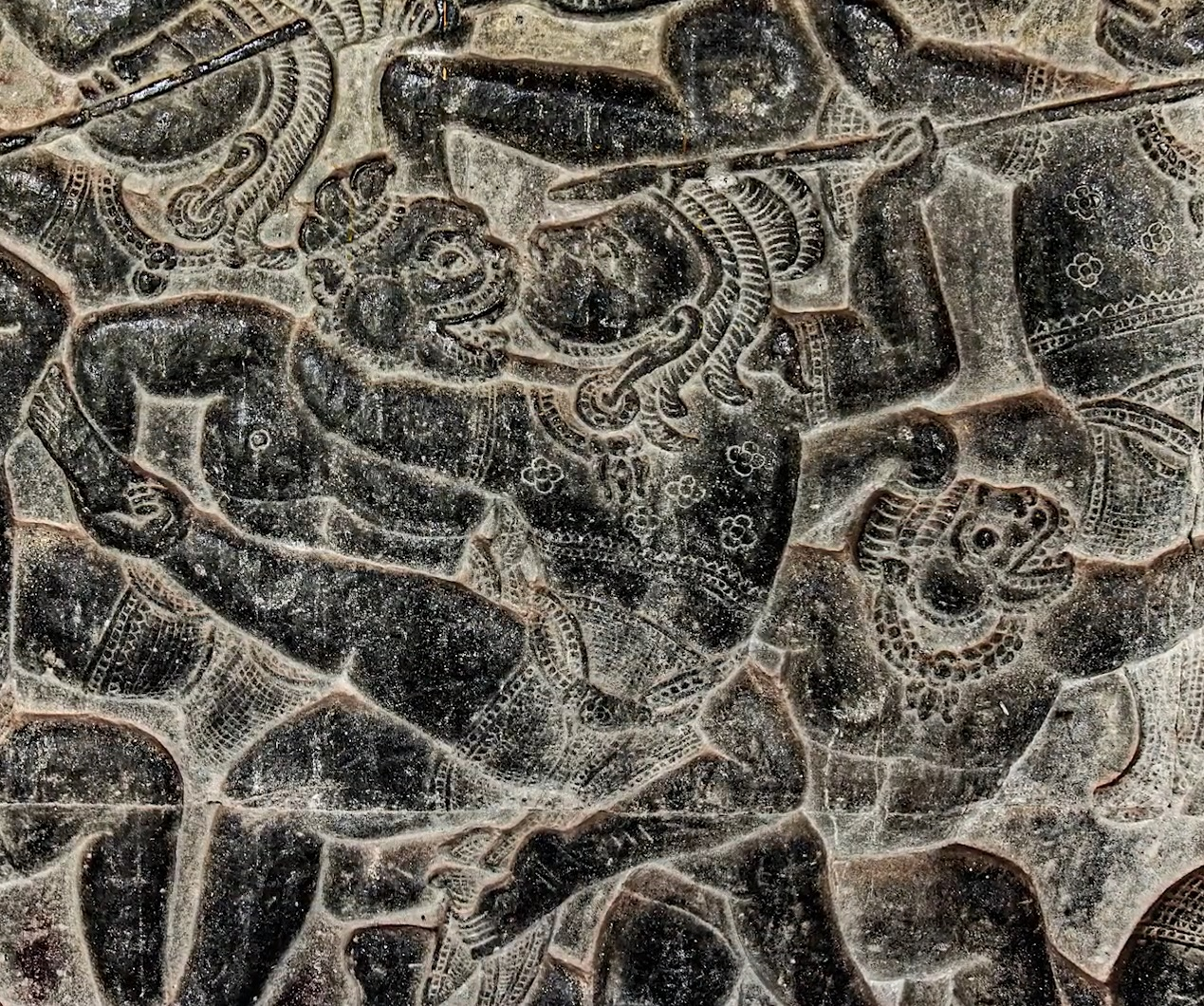
Bas-relief of a jump kick and spear attack. Located at Angkor Wat (1100's A.D.) in the Kingdom of Cambodia.

High kicks in general, as well as jump kicks, were foreign to Southern styles, and their presence in Wing Chun as well as Japanese and Korean martial arts is probably due to the influence of the Northern style of chinese martial arts. Historically, the development and diffusion of flying kick techniques in Asian martial arts seems to have taken place during the 1930s to 1950s. During this time, Chinese martial arts took an influence on traditional Okinawan martial arts, from the late 1940s specifically Shorinji Kempo. Okinawan martial arts in turn developed into karate and ultimately also taekwondo. Taekwondo's special emphasis on spinning, jumping and flying kicks is a development of the 1960s.

== Technique ==
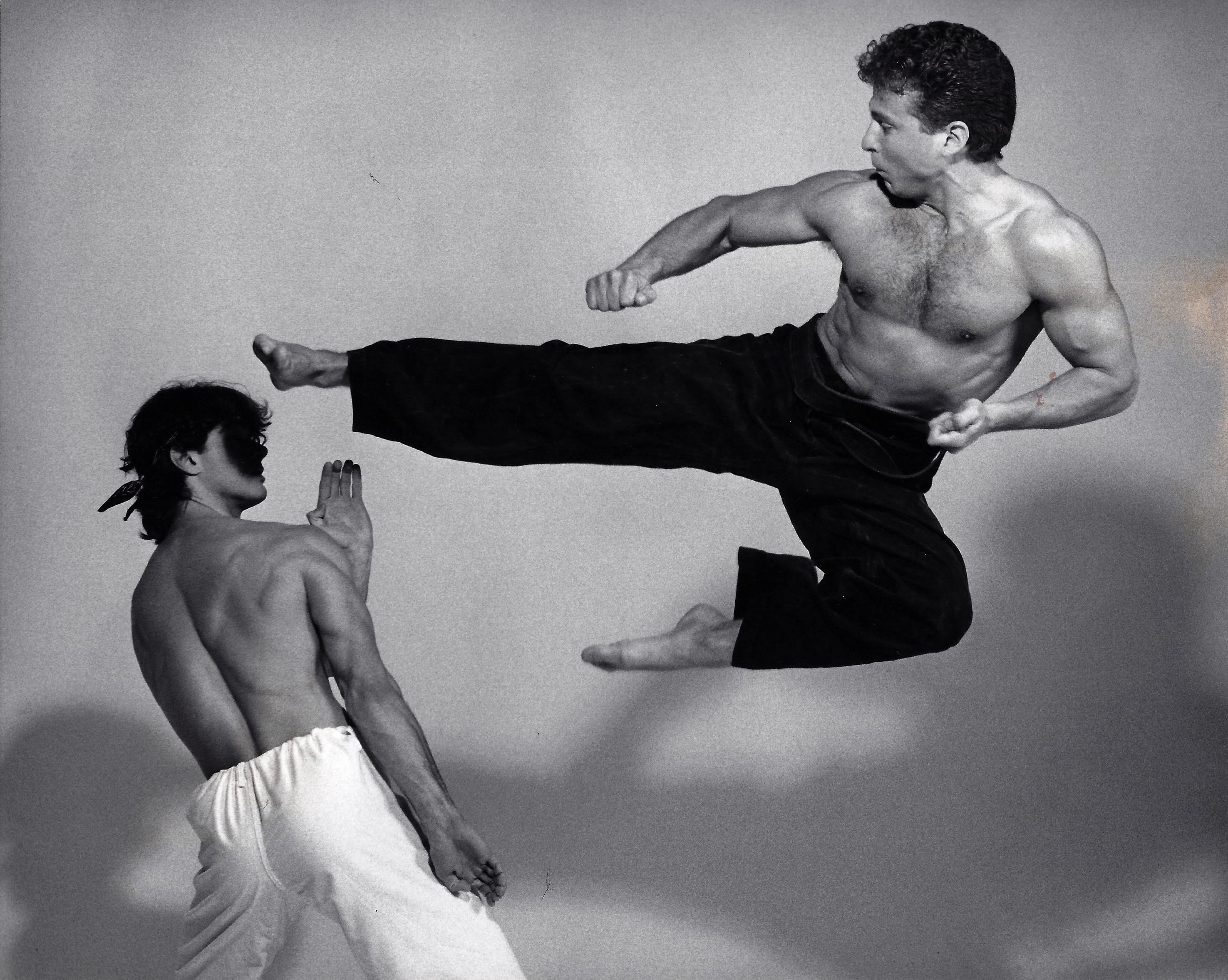
Flying kick performed by Kenn Scott

Effective accomplishment of a flying kick relies on a mental preparation combined with an athletic condition. For instance, a typical element of the preparation consists in mentally exercising and visualizing the flying kick before its execution. A flying kick correctly performed requires the individual to land on their feet while keeping balance.

== Practicality and purpose ==
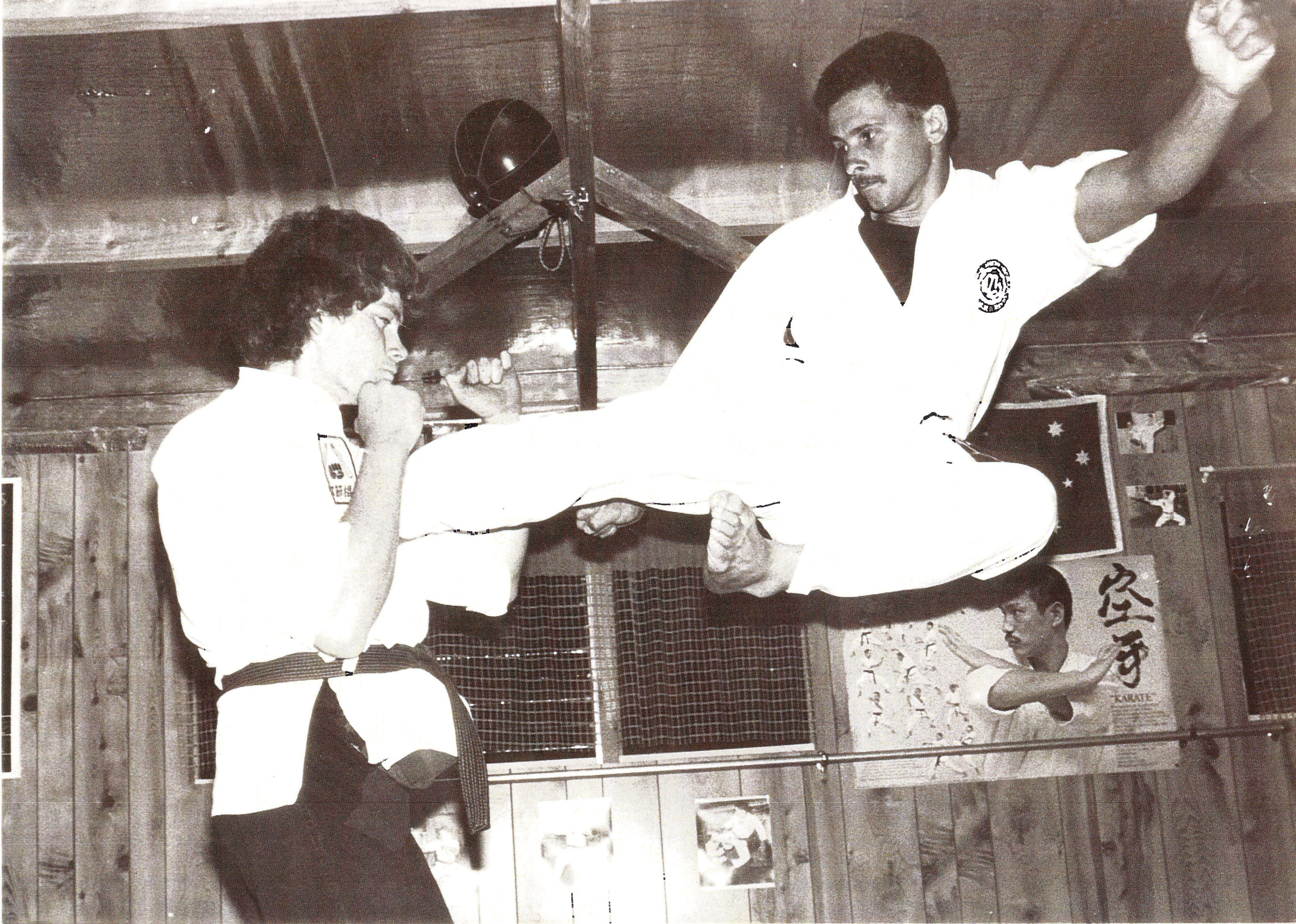
Ian Pollet executing a flying kick with one of his students

While the efficiency of a jump kick in combat sports or self-defense is highly debatable, the move is popular for demonstration purposes, showing off the practitioner's skill and control, as a dance move, or in cinema.

Flying kicks (regardless of concerns of utility) are considered among the martial arts techniques most difficult to perform correctly. A 1991 essay dedicated to flying kicks in taekwondo cites trainer Yeon Hwan Park arguing that the main benefit of training flying kicks is "the transcending of mental barriers by overcoming physical challenges that gives the student confidence." Park emphasizes that flying and jump kicks are among the most difficult and advanced techniques, and that he does not recommend their use in tournament situations, but at the same time he surmises that they might in theory be performed effectively even in self-defense situations once their execution has been mastered.

== In fiction ==
=== Crane kick ===
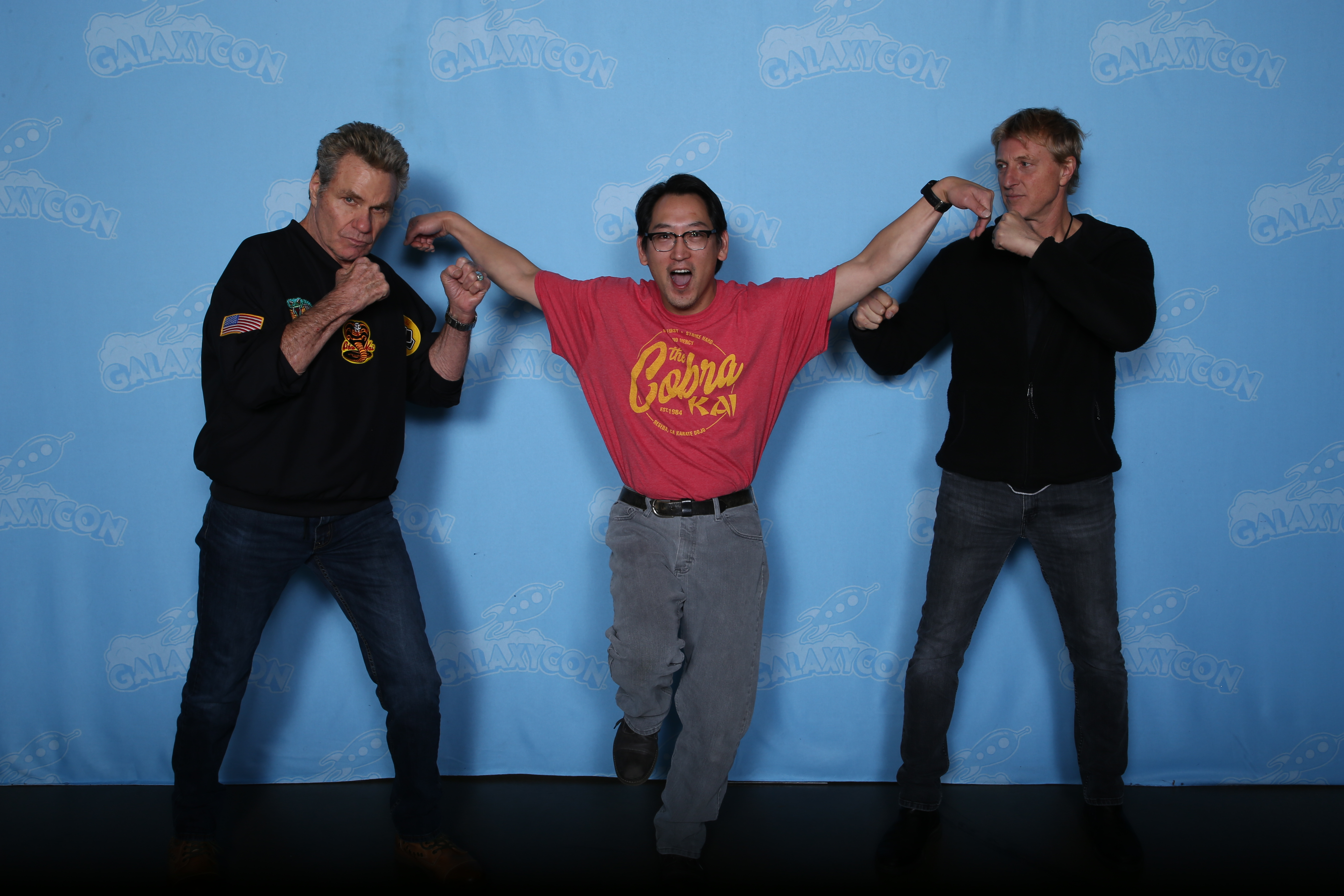
Fan performing crane kick between Martin Kove and William Zabka

The crane kick is a fictionalized version of the flying kick, Mae tobi geri (Japanese: 前飛蹴), created by Darryl Vidal for the 1984 martial arts film The Karate Kid. The move involves the user adopting a one-legged karate stance before launching into a flying jumping kick with the standing leg. The movie's success caused the crane kick to became synonymous with karate in the United States and helped popularize the martial art in that country.

In the original film, the move is first performed by the character Mr. Miyagi, and witnessed by Daniel LaRusso, who is then taught the move. The move is more famously used in the final scene of the picture, in which Daniel uses the crane kick to defeat his arch rival Johnny Lawrence in a karate match. The move is temporarily seen again in the sequel film, The Karate Kid Part II, as well as heavily referenced in the TV series Cobra Kai. In the latter, the kick is used by both Miguel Diaz and Johnny at various points as a way to mock Daniel, whilst Daniel himself uses it in the Season 5 finale to defeat Terry Silver. In the series finale, Daniel acknowledges that the kick had only worked against Johnny because Johnny ran right into it. While training Johnny for the Sekai Taikai final match, the two are shown practicing the crane kick on the beach. During his fight with Sensei Wolf -- which occurs in the same location that the match had taken place at in 1984 -- Johnny remembers Daniel defeating him with the crane kick and drops into a similar defensive stance, forgoing his usual strike first mentality. Similar to Daniel and Johnny's fight, this proves to be Wolf's undoing as Johnny is able to counter and defeat him when Wolf strikes first.

The move's effectiveness and practicality have been questioned by critics. The premise of the technique is to lure the opponent to move forward into a counterattack by appearing vulnerable. This vulnerability is created through two obvious tactical errors which an aggressive opponent would immediately take advantage of. First, standing tall with just one foot flat on the ground creates a stationary target for an opponent to strike. Second, spreading arms wide leaves the head and center of mass undefended. It is also worth noting this kick is an extreme feat of athleticism; it takes unusual leg strength and coordination for any fighter to leap off one foot (which is already bearing all their body weight) to deliver an effective strike with that same foot. Modified versions have been used effectively in Mixed Martial Arts, most notably by Lyoto Machida. Starting from a southpaw stance, Machida feinted with his left leg before leaping off his right foot to deliver an upwards right kick to the mouth of former UFC champion Randy Couture, earning a knockout victory. Commentators Mike Goldberg and Joe Rogan immediately noted the similarity to the crane kick.

In the Cobra Kai series finale, Daniel LaRusso acknowledges the crane kick's lack of practicality, noting that it was only successful against Johnny Lawrence because Johnny had been lured into running straight into it.

In the videogame Street Fighter Alpha 2, the elderly character Gen uses a crane style. He uses it again when he returns in Street Fighter IV.

== See also ==
- Butterfly kick
- Dropkick
- Jump inside kick
