= 540 kick =

Acrobatic and martial arts jump kick

The 540 kick is a jump kick move that is used in martial arts and tricking. It involves a rotation of approximately 540 degrees (although when performed correctly the performer has only done a spin of 360 degrees – not including whatever takeoff used).

== History ==
Traditionally, the technique is most associated with Korean martial arts such as Taekwondo and Tang Soo Do, best known for their flashy kicks and spins; however, depending on the variation, it is also practiced in various disciplines including Wushu, Shaolin kung fu, Capoeira, and some Karate styles. In essence, the most prominent defining feature of a 540 kick is that the same leg is used for taking off, kicking, and landing. The other leg is used to propel the performer into the air, and is then retracted before landing. It is said that many martial arts tricksters choose this move as their first move to attempt.

The move also shares history with ballet, where it is performed as an advanced variation of a 'barrel roll'. Principal male ballet dancers include the move in their variation (solo) as a crowd-pleasing feat of excellence. The move and a variation of it, the reverse 540, has been present in ballet for quite some time now, and is used commonly by dancers such as Daniil Simkin, Tetsuya Kumakawa and Joseph Phillips. This move has been recently introduced into the world of professional wrestling, where it is commonly referred to as a "jumping corkscrew roundhouse kick" (and Kofi Kingston's variation is called "Trouble in Paradise").

== Names ==
In Korean, the kick is referred to as the "Dolgaechagi" (Korean: 돌개차기; RR: Dolgaechagi; MR: Tolgaechagi; lit. 'Spinning Kick') and is mostly associated with the 540 Roundhouse kick or the 540 Hook kick.

In Japanese, the kick is referred to as the "Kūchūmawashigeri" (Japanese: 空中回し蹴り; kana: くうちゅうまわしげり; lit. 'Air Spin Kick') and is mostly associated with the 540 Roundhouse kick similar to Korea.

In Chinese, the kick is often referred to as the "Xuanfengjiao" (Chinese: 旋風腳; Chinese: 旋风脚; pinyin: Xuànfēngjiǎo; lit. 'Whirlwind Kick' also known as 'inside turning kick', 'jump inside kick', and 'hyper-tornado kick') and is commonly associated with the 540 Crescent kick.

In Portuguese, the kick is called the "Martelo Voador" (lit. 'Spinning Kick') and is used in Capoeira.

== Variations ==
Like with most variations of martial arts kicks, the name of the kick is normally determined by the position of the foot, degree of rotation and positioning of the hips, and any additional kicks that may be added during the execution.

=== Taekwondo ===
==== 540 roundhouse ====
The 540 roundhouse version is known for its full rotation of the hip before executing the kick. The kick itself is executed as a roundhouse kick, meaning that a target would be hit with the top of the foot or ankle to avoid breaking the toes. It is also called a "bolley kick" by some in taekwondo, and was popularized in the mid-eighties by George Chung and Steven Ho in open martial art competitions.

In taekwondo, a tricking "540 kick" refers to this technique, rather than the traditional "540 hook" kick. This technique is also shared in certain styles of Karate as well.

==== 540 hook ====
A Taekwondo-style 540 Hook kick

Also known as the "cheat 720" or the "540 wheel", and arguably the most well-known 540 kick, the 540 hook uses the same takeoff as a typical 540 kick; however, unlike the normal roundhouse kick, it requires the spin to add another 180 degrees to perform a hook kick or outside crescent kick with the other leg rather than using the jumping leg to kick, depending on the position of the foot.

This technique is one of the variations that spins a full 540 degrees in taekwondo. When referring to a "540 kick" in taekwondo, it normally refers to this kick rather than the "540 roundhouse" kick which is more reserved for the tricking variant.

A capoeira variation of the 540 hook exists under gancho, however, the execution is vastly different from the popularized taekwondo style.

=== Wushu ===
==== 540 crescent ====
A Wushu-style 540 Crescent kick

This variation of the kick is typically found in wushu.

The kick is executed as a crescent kick, meaning that the toes are pointed forwards with the hips facing the target. If aiming for a target, the target would be hit with the inside of the foot (from the heel to the big toe).

==== 540 gyro ====
A 540 gyro is performed when a 540 crescent kick is executed, but instead of landing immediately on the kicking leg, a rotate of an additional 360 degrees mid-air is performed before landing.

The practice is rather uncommon in the tricking community due to its difficulty, but is present in martial arts disciplines such as in wushu.

=== Others ===
==== Double leg 540 ====
A technique that incorporates a take off from both legs and executed with an inside crescent kick.

==== Fake 540 ====
A jump turning kick that mimics the 540. The practitioner, already facing the target, jumps up to perform an inside crescent or roundhouse kick, and tucks the other to then land on the kicking foot. This motion does not share the full take off pattern of a true 540.

==== Reverse 540 ====
A kick that has the take off of a 1-over 360 kick.

The technique often starts with the back of the right foot while throwing it forward counterclockwise, tucking and pushing it off with the right. It follows up with a jump up and a complete 360 with an outside, counterclockwise crescent kick that lands on the same foot.

==== Sideswipe ====
Though the body mechanism/technique is different, the Sideswipe and 540 are categorized together because they both use the same leg to take off, kick, and land. The variation is regarded similar to a standard 540 kick, but with the body spinning parallel to the ground and that can be performed almost inverted. After the non-kicking leg is thrown up in the take-off, the body is leaned back so it is spinning at least horizontally. This kick has less practical use due to the higher levels of agility required.

==== Lazyboy 540 ====
Also referred to as simply a Lazyboy or "Playboy 540", this variation is identical to a typical 540 from a technical standpoint. The defining characteristic of the Lazyboy is that the hands are placed on the back or top of the head. The pose is meant to simulate the image of a person relaxing or lying down. While struck in the air, this variation is performed to show the ease in which a practitioner can perform the trick, demonstrating that they don't need the momentum of the arms to complete the trick, and/or to add style to the trick.

This trick is also known as the Playboy 540 for its extravagance and confident posture such of a playboy.

==== 540 into splits ====
In most cases, the traditional 540 kick can be landed into the splits by sending the kicking leg backwards after the kick has been executed and extending the other leg forward during the landing. Theoretically, almost every trick can be landed in the splits, however, landing some of the more advanced versions of tricks like this would require extra height in the jump, extra rotation of the body, and a very keen sense of timing and spatial awareness.

=== Multi-kick variants ===
Some variants of the 540 include multiple kicks being executed while in the air.

==== Crescent 540 ====
Also known as the "feilong" and not to be confused with the 540 crescent.

A crescent 540 is where a crescent kick is thrown out with the first leg before the regular 540 kick is thrown with the other. Both of these kicks are executed mid-air. A variation of this is where the first crescent kick is thrown as a twisted front kick, followed by a round house kick. For this the hips must be rotated more before the kicks are thrown, allowing the feet to be turned towards the targets.

==== Jack-knife ====
A jack-knife is similar to a crescent 540 in that there are two kicks executed in sequence, however the 540 kick (either crescent or roundhouse) is thrown out first. Immediately following the first kick, the other leg comes around to execute a heel kick after rotating an additional 180 degrees. The mechanics to this variant are almost identical to a 540-wheel or cheat 720. Proper execution of this involves performing a roundhouse kick instead of an inside crescent kick, with the hips turned over and toes pointed. In doing so, after the first kick is completed, the kicker's hips and body are in a better position to spin around and snap out the hook.

==== 540 triple ====
A 540 triple is the combination of a crescent 540 and a jack-knife, essentially executing three separate kicks during the same motion. One with the landing leg and two with the other. The kicks and their execution are similar to those of a 720 triple. This move is commonly performed in taekwondo demonstrations.
