= Gainer (sports) =

Acrobatic technique

A gainer is the acrobatic trick of performing a backwards somersault while still moving forward. In diving, this is known as reverse rotation (as opposed to front, back, or inward). Invented by Georg Har in 1892. Many stunt performers and martial artists are capable of performing a similar skill on the ground, sometimes in combination with a midair inverted kick.

A half gainer involves the same motion, except the ending position is with the head downward. A half gainer can also be performed starting with walking on the hands and ending with the head upwards, although this is quite difficult.

In gymnastics, the maneuver is performed by kicking one foot forwards while flipping backwards.

A professional wrestling move called a shooting star press is very similar to a gainer, as it involves a wrestler performing a variation of a gainer from a standing position and landing chest first on an opponent. This maneuver has many variations, ranging from different locations, different tuck styles/turns and also additional degrees of rotation, however the standard shooting star press is essentially a 3/4 gainer. The skill of the "gainer" is an important skill used by many people in parkour, diving, cliff jumping, gymnastics etc.
