= Misty flip =

Flip performed in freestyle sports

The misty flip is an off-axis backside 540° rotation performed in freestyle sports such as freeskiing, snowboarding, skateboarding, inline skating or trampolining. The misty flip was first done by Jason King out of the Sugarbush half pipe circa 1991. The trick was later named by professional snowboarder Ali Goulet, an original member of the Vermont Snowboard Posse that included Jeff Brushie, Chris Swierz, and Josh Brownley. Unlike in acrobatic disciplines where athletes remain in the same plane in space during the trick, the backside 540 rotation and off axis spin are combined. Not unlike a McTwist but off a straight jump rather than a transition. Misty flips can be performed in many variations with bigger spins, grabs and even double misty.

In order to perform a misty flip, a person must throw their shoulder down to their left or right side, commencing a spin while their head and body invert to an up-side down position. The person lands backwards or forwards, depending on the rotation amount.

In snowboarding, when performed on a straight jump, the motion initiates a rotation that mimics that of a McTwist, which is generally performed in halfpipes and on quarterpipes. However, because the misty flip is performed on a straight jump, it is further distinguished from a McTwist because the rider lands backwards following the 540 rotation.

The misty flip was published in Blunt Magazine Volume 3.1 circa 1994, performed by Ali Goulet, photographed by Rob Mcconaughy of Kingpin Productions who also put the trick in his movie “Caffeine”

== Similar tricks ==
- Bio spin
- McTwist
